= Jayanegara =

14th-century emperor of Majapahit

Jayanagara
- Maharaja of Majapahit; Bhre Daha

2nd Maharaja of Majapahit
- Reign: 1309 – 1328
- Predecessor: Kertarajasa Jayawardhana
- Successor: Tribhuwana Wijayatunggadewi

1st Prince of Daha
- Reign: 1295 – 1309
- Successor: Rajadewi Maharajasa
- Died: 1328; Kingdom of Majapahit
- Burial: Kapopongan Palace, Antawulan, Kingdom of Majapahit
Regnal name
- Çri Maharaja Wirālandagopāla Çri Sundarapāndya Dewā Adhiswara ꦯꦿꦶꦩꦲꦬꦗꦮꦶꦬꦭꦟ꧀ꦢꦓꦺꦴꦦꦭ ꦯꦿꦶꦯꦸꦟ꧀ꦢꦬꦦꦟ꧀ꦢꦾꦢꦺꦮꦲꦝꦶꦯ꧀ꦮꦬ
- House: Rajasa
- Father: King Kertarajasa Jayawardhana Dyah Wijaya
- Mother: Indreswari (biological); Tribhuwaneswari (adoptive)
- Religion: Hinduism

Jayanegara or Jayanagara (formal regnal name Sri Maharaja Wiralandagopala Sri Sundarapandya Dewa Adhiswara or Sri Sundarapandyadevadhisvara Vikramottungadeva, also known as Kala Gemet) was a Javanese emperor and the second monarch of the Majapahit Empire from 1309 to his death in 1328, and also Prince of Kediri from 1295. Jayanegara was the heir, crown prince, and only son of Raden Wijaya, the founder of Majapahit. The story of his life was written in several records, including the Pararaton and Negarakertagama. His reign saw the beginning of Gajah Mada's rise to influence in the empire.

== Early life ==
Dyah Wijaya took all of Kertanegara's four daughters' hands in marriage. The sisters were Parameswari Tribhuwana also known as Trubhuwaneswari (the eldest), Prajnaparamita, Narendraduhita, and Rajapatni Gayatri (the youngest). The reason for Dyah Wijaya's practice of sibling polygamy was to ensure his claim of legitimacy and to prevent the contest for Kertanegara's Singhasari legacy. Dyah Wijaya also married Indreswari (also known as Dara Petak), the princess of the Malayu Kingdom, who was brought to the Majapahit court from Sumatra through Kertanegara's Pamalayu expedition. Dyah Wijaya or Prince Nararya Sangramawijaya ascended to the Majapahit throne and took the regnal name of King Kertarajasa Jayawardhana in circa 1293/1294.

Jayanegara was King Kertarajasa's son. His name comes from the Sanskrit-derived Old Javanese words jaya ("glorious") and nagara ("city" or "nation"), and thus means "glorious nation".

Without a doubt, Prince Jayanegara was a legitimate son of Dyah Wijaya. However, there are several differing accounts concerning the identity of Jayanegara's mother. Some earlier historians consider him the son of Queen Tribhuwaneswari (not to be confused with Queen regnant Tribhuwana Wijayatunggadewi, Jayanegara's half-sister and daughter of Gayatri Rajapatni), thus earning him the right to become the crown prince. Sukamerta and Balawi inscriptions mention that from parameswari (primary queen) Tribhuwana, King Kertarajasa begot a son named Jayanagara. However, according to the Pararaton, Jayanegara was Wijaya's son from Dara Petak, the princess of Malayu Dharmasraya. Nagarakretagama also mentioned that the mother of Jayanegara is Sri Indreswari. While Queen Tribhuwaneswari and most of her sisters were childless, only Queen Gayatri had two daughters: Queen regnant Tribhuwana Wijayatunggadewi and Rajadewi. To reconcile these accounts, some historians have suggested that Jayanegara was Dara Petak's biological son but was adopted by the childless Queen Tribhuwaneswari and raised as her own.

== Reign ==
The reign of Jayanegara was a difficult and chaotic one, as was his father's, marked with several rebellions by former companions in arms. Among others are Gajah Biru's rebellion in 1314 and the Kuti rebellion in 1319. The Kuti rebellion was the most dangerous rebellion and a significant one, as Kuti managed to take control of the palace and the capital city. With the help of Gajah Mada and his palace guard, Jayanegara barely escaped from the capital and safely hid in Badander village. While the king was in hiding, Gajah Mada returned to the capital city to learn the situation. After learning that Kuti's rebellion was not supported by the people or the nobles of the Majapahit court, Gajah Mada led the resistance forces to crush the Kuti rebellion.

Finally, the Kuti forces were crushed and Jayanegara safely returned to his throne. For his loyalty and excellent service, Gajah Mada was promoted to higher office and began his career in court royal politics.

According to tradition, although strikingly handsome, Jayanegara was notorious for his immorality and bad behavior. He was known for his unpopular acts of desiring the wives and daughters of his subordinates. For this, he was entitled Kala Gemet, or "weak villain" by Pararaton's writer.

One of his distasteful acts was his desire to take his own stepsisters, Princess Tya (the future Queen regnant Tribhuwana Wijayatunggadewi) and Princess Wiyat (the future Rajadevi Maharajasa of Daha), as wives. He put his half-sisters in the custody of a fortified palace and left them unmarried beyond their suitable age for marriage. However, his act was likely motivated to ensure his position and legitimacy and to prevent possible future contests from the suitors of his half-sisters.

His unpopularity in Javanese literature and traditions was fuelled by his origin as the son of a Sumatran Malayu princess, thus making him viewed as a foreigner and not a true Javanese. He also was not the son of any of Kertanegara's daughters, which undermined his claim to legitimacy within the Rajasa dynastic legacy.

He sent embassies to China from 1325 to 1328.

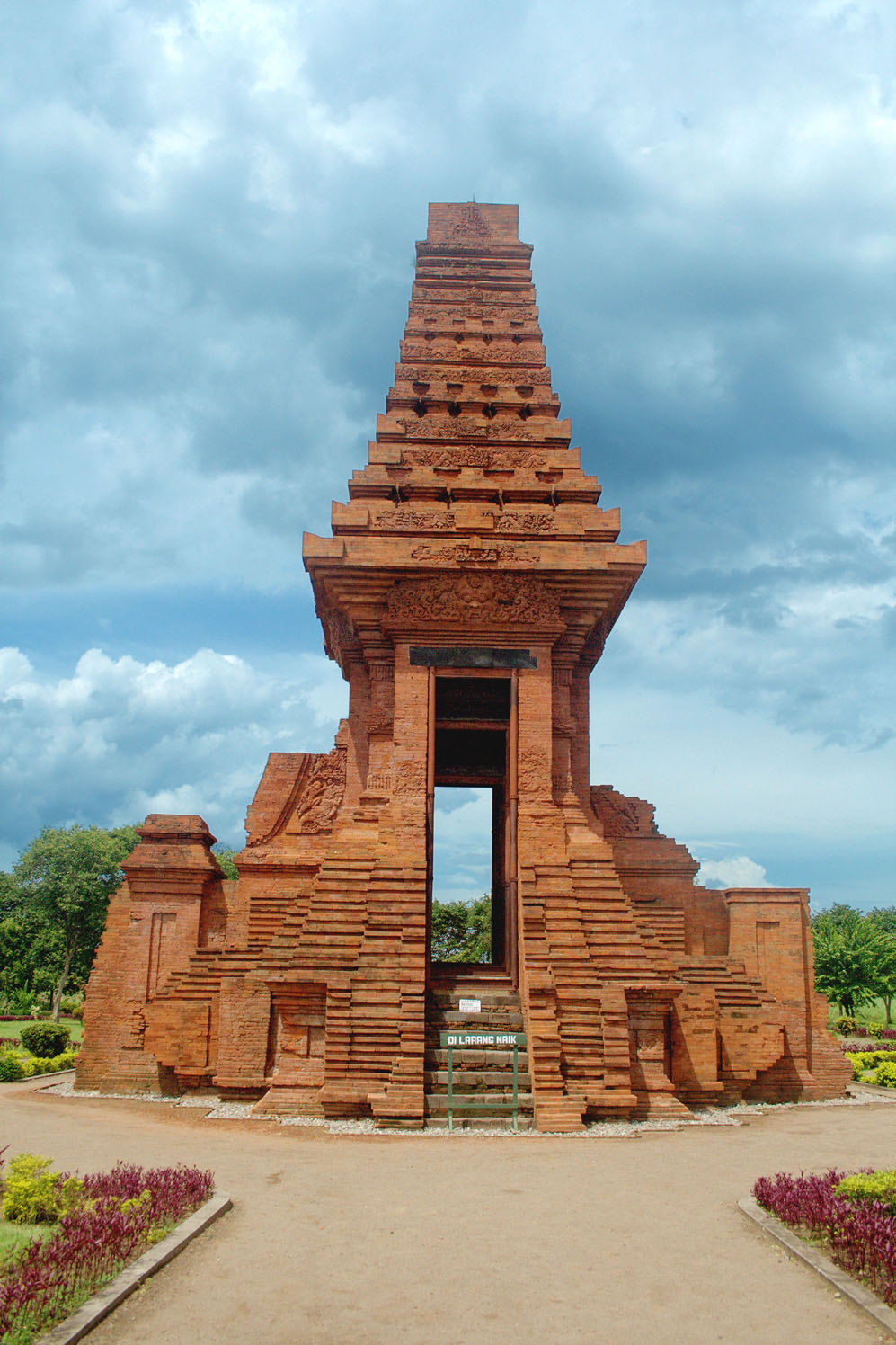
Bajang Ratu gate in Trowulan palace compound

== Assassination ==
In 1328, Jayanegara was murdered by his doctor, Tanca, during a minor operation. Gajah Mada punished and killed Tanca right away before the thorough investigation commenced. The true nature of Jayanegara's assassination has remained a mystery.

George Coedes states he was "assassinated by a noble whose wife he had seduced." Some historians concluded that the aforementioned Tanca was this nobleman.

Another theory suspects that Gajah Mada was the mastermind behind the assassination, as Gajah Mada was the loyal and trusted advisor of Princess Tribhuwana Wijayatunggadewi. Jayanegara remained childless until his death, leaving him without an heir, and his throne was passed to one of his siblings.

Gayatri Rajapatni, first wife of Raden Wijaya, was supposed to ascend the throne since Jayanegara had no sons. However, she became a bhikkhuni and was therefore prohibited from holding positions of political authority, so her daughter, Tribhuvana (Tribhuwana Wijayatunggadewi, or Tribhuwannottungadewi Jayawishnuwardhani), became regent instead. By 1330, she had married Chakradhara, or Chakresvara, who assumed the title of Prince of Singhasari and the name Kritavardhana. Their son, Hayam Wuruk, was born in 1334 and became king in 1350.

The Bajang Ratu gate in Trowulan has traditionally been linked to Jayanegara. The gate was identified as part of Çrenggapura (Çri Ranggapura), his pedharmaan, the Kapopongan of Antawulan, a holy compound to appease and honor the soul of the late King Jayanegara.

Preceded by Raden Wijaya	Monarch of Majapahit Empire; 1309–1328	Succeeded by Tribhuwana Wijayatunggadewi
