= Tribhuwana Wijayatunggadewi =

Javanese third monarch of Majapahit empire

Sri Tribhuwanotunggadewi
- Maharani of Majapahit; Bhre Kahuripan
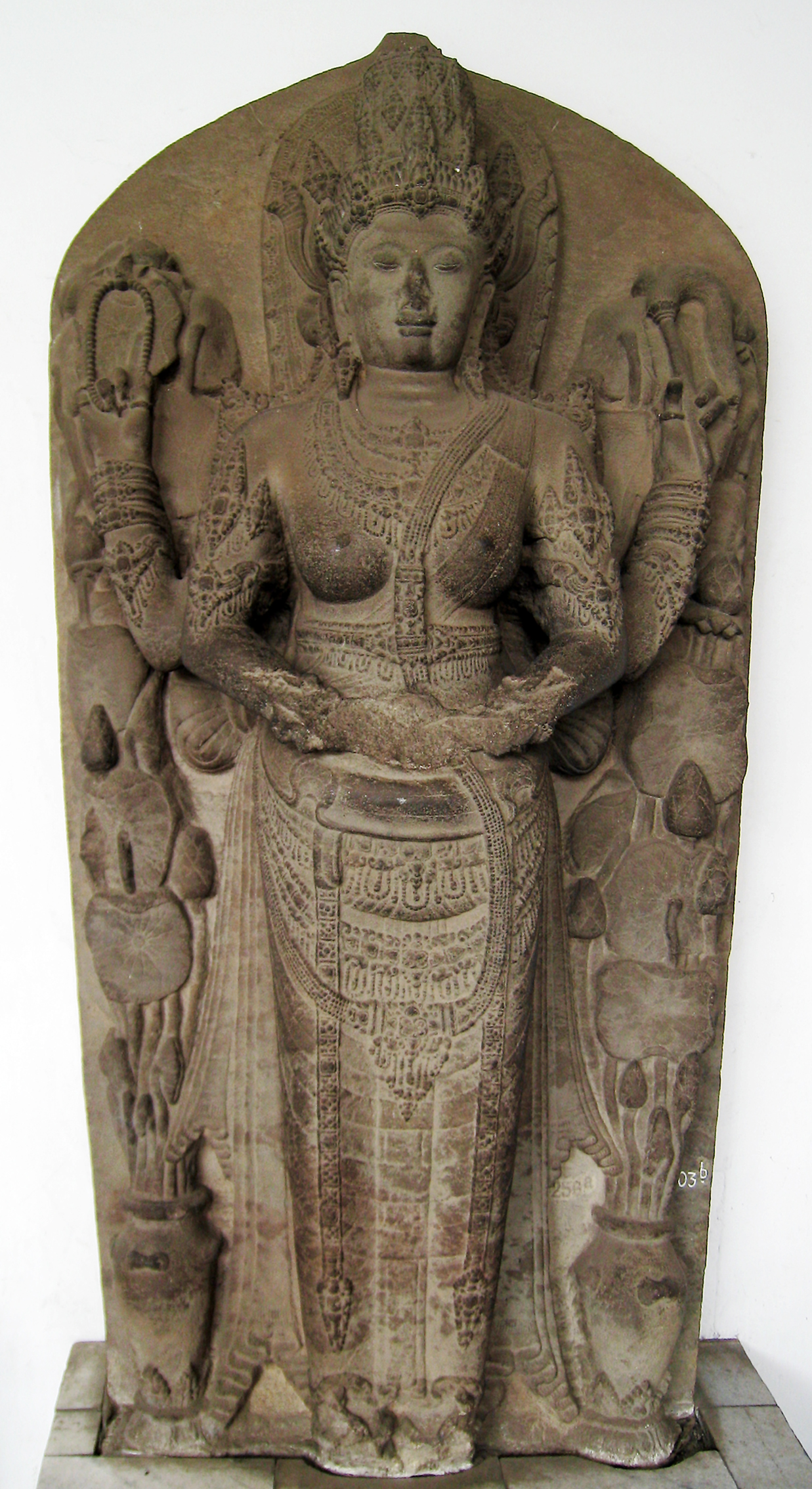
- The statue of Tribhuwanottungadewi, Empress of Majapahit, depicted as Parvati

3rd Maharani of Majapahit
- Reign: 1328 – 1350
- Predecessor: Jayanegara
- Successor: Hayam Wuruk

1st Princess of Kahuripan
- Tenure: 1309 – 1328; 1350 – ca. 1372 – 1375
- Successor: Hayam Wuruk; Vikramavardhana
- Born: Dyah Tya before 1309
- Died: ca. 1372 – 1375
- Burial: Pantarapura, Panggih, Kingdom of Majapahit
- Spouse: Kertawardhana Dyah Cakradhara, Prince of Tumapel
- Issue: King Rajasanagara Dyah Hayam Wuruk; Rajasaduteswari Dyah Nertaja, Princess of Pajang
Regnal name
- Çri Tribhuwanotunggadewī Mahārājasa Jayawisnuwārddhani ꦯꦿꦶꦡꦿꦶꦨ꧀ꦲꦸꦮꦟꦡꦸꦁꦓꦢꦺꦮꦶ ꦩꦲꦬꦗꦯꦗꦪꦮꦶꦯ꧀ꦟꦸꦮꦂꦝꦟꦶ "The exalted goddess of three worlds which the glory of Vishnu radiates"
- House: Rajasa
- Father: King Kertarajasa Jayawardhana Dyah Wijaya
- Mother: Rajapatni Rajendra Dyah Dewī Gayatri
- Religion: Hinduism

Tribhuwana Wijayatunggadewi, known in her regnal name Tribhuwannottunggadewi Jayawishnuwardhani, also known as Dyah Gitarja or Gitarja, was a Javanese queen regnant and empress and the third Majapahit monarch, reigning from 1328 to 1350. She also bears the title Bhre Kahuripan (Duchess of Kahuripan). With the help of her prime minister Gajah Mada, she pursued a massive expansion of the empire. Tradition mentioned her as a woman of extraordinary valour, wisdom and intelligence.

== Early life ==
According to Geneng II inscription, her given name was Dyah Tya. She was the first daughter of King Kertarajasa Jayawardhana, the founder of Majapahit Empire by his principal wife Dyah Gayatri who held the title of Rajapatni. The king was a descendant of Ken Arok, the founder of Singhasari Kingdom through Mahisa Wonga Teleng's lineage. While, Queen Gayatri was the youngest daughter of King Kertanagara, the last ruler of Singhasari from Anusapati's lineage. Thus, making Tya a prominent Rajasa dynasty member.

She was the eldest of Wijaya's offspring, her younger sister namely Dyah Wiyat, both were the daughter of Rajapatni Gayatri, while her half-brother was Jayanagara, the son of Indreswari. According to Nagarakretagama canto 48 stanza 1, her half-brother Jayanegara succeeded to the throne upon the death of her father in 1309, while she and her sister gained the title of Paduka Bhatara simply referred to Bhre. She was the Bhre Kahuripan "Princess of Kahuripan" or Jiwana or Jenggala (now Sidoarjo), while her sister was the Bhre Daha "Princess of Daha" (now Kediri) respectively. They were likened to the twin Ratih, a Hindu goddess worshiped by Javanese whose beauty surpassed all of the nymphs.

According to the Pararaton, King Jayanegara desired his half-sisters to be his consorts. The practice of half-sibling marriage is abhorred in Javanese tradition, subsequently the council of royal elders led by Queen Dowager Gayatri spoke strongly against the king's wishes. The motivation of Jayanegara's wish was not clear — it might have been his way to ensure his throne's legitimacy by preventing rivals from his half sisters' suitors.

Nevertheless, Jayanegara went further to prevent his half-sisters' courtship by confining Tya and Wiyat in the kaputren (ladies quarter) of the palace, locking them in a well-guarded inner compound, and denying the two princesses contact and access to the court and public affairs. This confinement continued for years until both princesses grew mature and passed their suitable age for marriage in Javanese tradition. This alarmed their mother, Queen Dowager Gayatri, who desperately tried to free her daughters from captivity.

== Marriage ==
After the death of King Jayanagara in 1328, there was a contest to marry the two princesses. According to Pararaton, two noblemen, namely Cakradhara and Kudamerta won the contest. Thus, Tya took Cakradhara as her husband, later known as the Prince consort Kertawardhana, Bhre Tumapel "Prince of Tumapel". Kudamerta married her sister, then known as Prince Wijayarajasa, Bhre Wengker "Prince of Wengker".

Cakradhara was likened to Ratnasambawa, one of the five dhyani buddhas. Nagarakretagama's writer praised them as a devout Buddhist couple. They had two children, the eldest was Dyah Hayam Wuruk, the future King Rajasanagara (born in 1334), and the youngest was Dyah Nertaja. Dyah Hayam Wuruk inherited his mother's position as Bhre Kahuripan before ruling the entire kingdom. He would take Wijayarajasa's daughter by a concubine as his queen. While Dyah Nertaja who was also called Wardhanaduhiteswari or Rajasaduhiteswari which means "daughter of Kertawardhana or daughter of the Rajasa clan" became Bhre Pajang "Princess of Pajang". Cakradhara was also a great-grandfather of Prince consort Ratnapangkaja through another son, Dyah Sotor. He was Tya's stepson.

== Reign ==
According to the Nagarakretagama, Princess Tya came to the throne by the order of her mother Gayatri in 1329, replacing Jayanegara, who was murdered in 1328. A theory suspected that Gajah Mada was the mastermind behind the assassination, as Gajah Mada was the loyal and trusted advisor for Queen Mother Rajapatni who sought to liberate her daughters from Jayanegara's captivity. By that time, Rajapatni Gayatri was the last surviving elder and matriarch of Majapahit royal family, and supposed to secure the throne since Jayanegara had no sons. But she had entered a convent, and had her daughter placed upon the throne.

Princess Tya ascended to throne under her new regnal name Tribhuwannottunggadewi Jayawishnuwardhani, which means "The exalted goddess of three worlds which the glory of Vishnu radiates". Tribhuwana governed with the help of her spouse, Kertawardhana or Kritavardhana. She became the mother and predecessor to Hayam Wuruk, the fourth monarch of the Majapahit empire.

In 1331, she led the army herself to the battlefield with the help of her cousin, Adityawarman, to crush rebellion in the areas of Sadeng and Keta. The decision was partly to resolve the competition between Gajah Mada and Ra Kembar for the army general position to crush Sadeng. In 1334, she appointed Gajah Mada as her new Mahapatih (Javanese title equal to Prime Minister), and Gajah Mada proclaimed his famed Palapa oath, asserting his intention to expand the influence of the kingdom across the archipelago. According to Pararaton, his extraordinary vow surprised the court and state officials who attended his inauguration. Some of them, especially Mada's rival, Ra Kembar, laughed and mocked Mada, ridiculed him as a big-mouthed bluff with an impossible dream. This public humiliation enraged Gajah Mada, resulting in a duel, warranted by Tribhuwana, which led to the death of Ra Kembar and the execution of others that opposed his authority.

With the help of Gajah Mada as prime minister, Tribhuwana pursued a massive expansion of the empire. In 1343 Majapahit conquered the Kingdom of Pejeng, Dalem Bedahulu and the entire island of Bali. Adityawarman was sent to conquer the rest of the Kingdom of Srivijaya and the Melayu Kingdom in 1347. He was then promoted as uparaja (lower king) of Sumatra. Majapahit expansion continued under the reign of Hayam Wuruk, reaching Lamuri (present-day Aceh) in the West and Wanin (Onin Peninsula, Papua) in the East.

== Later life ==
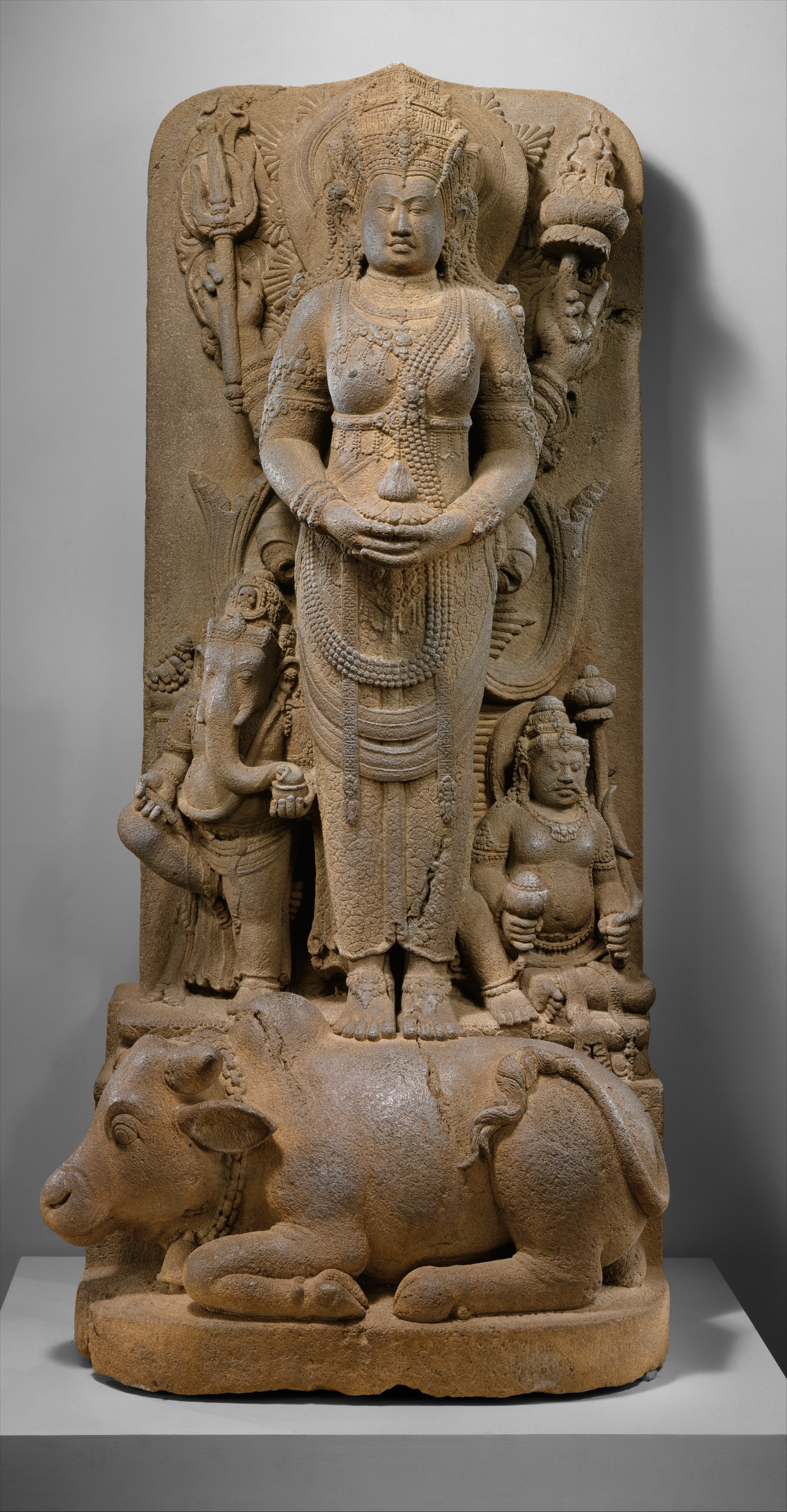
From the Metropolitan Museum of Art collection

Tribhuwana's reign ended as her mother Gayatri Rajapatni died in her retirement at a Buddhist monastery in 1350. Because she ruled Majapahit under Rajapatni's auspices to represent her, Queen Tribhuwana had to abdicate, and was obliged to relinquish her throne to her son. After her abdication, Tribhuwana did not retire completely, she was still actively involved in state affairs. During the reign of her son, King Hayam Wuruk, she was appointed for the second time as the Bhre Kahuripan, the ruler of Kahuripan coastal country, which was a Majapahit vital port during that time. She also became the member of Bhattara Saptaprabhu, the council of royal elders who offered advice to the king.

Tribhuwana died later in her retirement residence in Majapahit. A grand royal mortuary Hindu cremation ceremony ensued. She was posthumously deified as Parvati in Rimbi temple, East Java. In Javanese devaraja culture, the monarch is believed to be the incarnation of a certain god, and after death their soul is believed to be united with that god, and revered as such in a temple, dedicated for the departed soul of the monarch.

== In popular culture ==
In video games

- Gitarja appears as the leader of Indonesia in the strategy video game Sid Meier's Civilization VI, released in 2016.
- Tribhuwana appears as a playable hero in the mobile strategy game Age of Empires Mobile.

== Bibliography ==
- Bullough, Nigel (1995). Historic East Java: Remains in Stone. Adline Communications.
- Pringle, Robert (2004). Bali: Indonesia's Hindu Realm; A short history of. Short History of Asia Series. Allen & Unwin. ISBN 1-86508-863-3.
- Muljana, Slamet (2005) [First published 1965]. Menuju Puncak Kemegahan (in Indonesian). Yogyakarta: LKIS.
- Muljana, Slamet (1979). Nagarakretagama dan Tapsir Sejarahnya (in Indonesian). Jakarta: Bhratara.

Preceded by Jayanegara	Monarch of Majapahit Empire; 1328–1350	Succeeded by Hayam Wuruk
