= Mongol invasion of Java =

13th-century military campaign

- Part of the Mongol invasions and conquests and Kublai Khan's campaigns
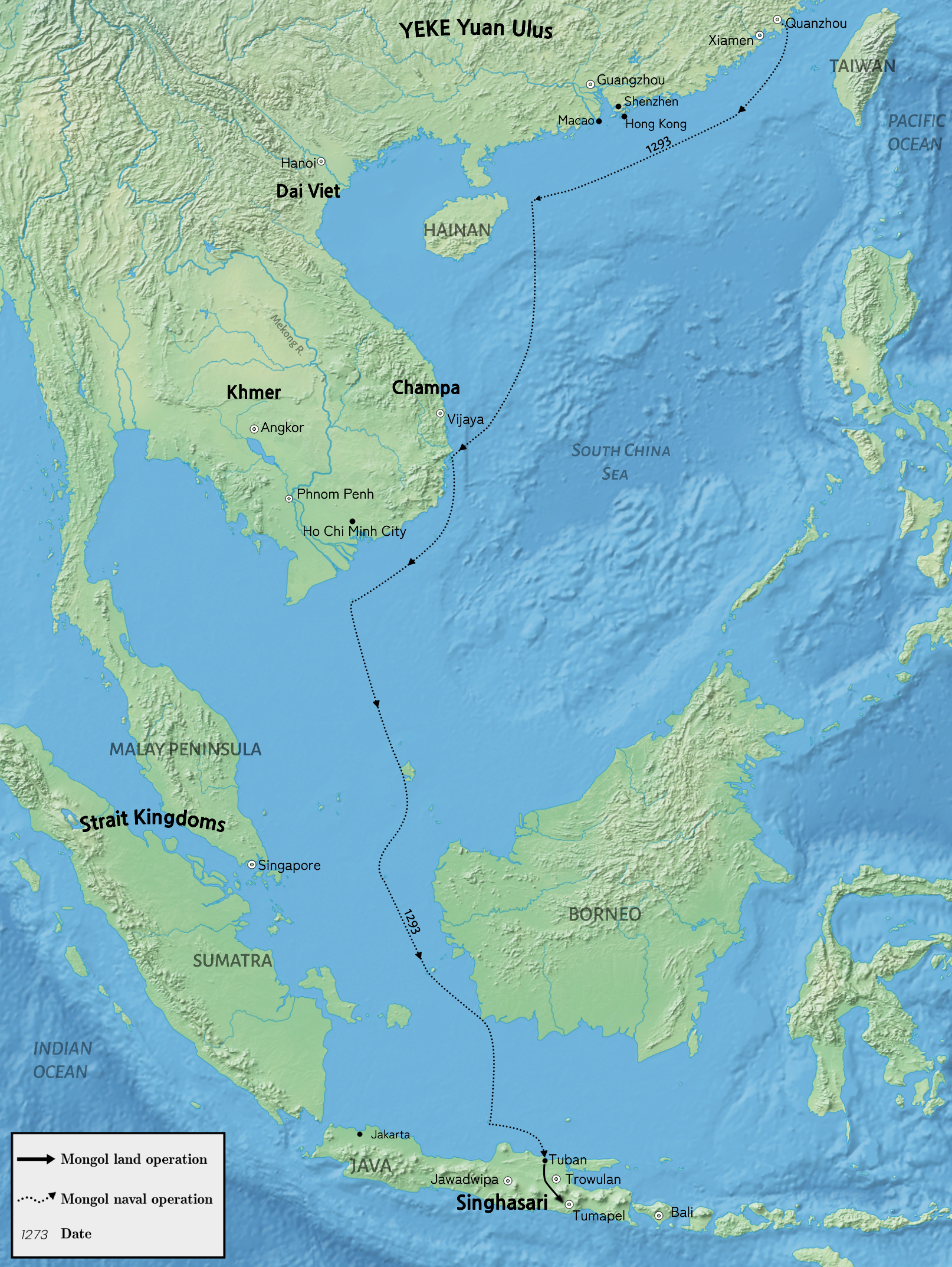
- Mongol invasion of Java in 1293
Date	22 January – early August 1293
Location	East Java: the city of Daha and Majapahit, along the Brantas River and Mas River
Result	Majapahit victory
Territorial changes	Establishment of the Majapahit Empire

Belligerents
Yuan dynasty Majapahit (prior to 26 May)	Kediri Kingdom	Majapahit (after 26 May)

Commanders and leaders
Kublai Khan; Shi Bi; Gao Xing; Yïγmïš	Jayakatwang (executed); Ardharaja (executed); Kebo Mundarang (executed) / † (Note: According to Pararaton, Kebo Mundarang battled in the east. He was pursued by Rangga Lawe to a place called Trinipanti valley and killed. And according to another source, Kebo Mundarang battled in the south. He was brought to a plain and executed by Ken Sora.); Panglet †; Sagara Winotan † (Note: According to the Pararaton, Rangga Lawe succeeded in killing the Senapati (commander) named Sagara Winotan who led and guarded the eastern fortress of the Kediri Kingdom, in battle during the attack on the capital of Daha.); Mahisa Rubuh (surrendered)	Raden Wijaya; Ken Sora; Nambi; Ranggalawe; Aria Wiraraja; Kebo Anabrang

Strength
20,000–30,000; 500–1,000 ships	10,000 (Note: According to Kidung Harsawijaya, during the attack on Singhasari, the Daha troops who attacked from the south numbered 10,000 men; while the northern troops were unspecified.) (Note: modern estimate)–100,000+ (Note: Mongol claim)	10,000–20,000+ (Note: According to Kidung Harsawijaya, the Singhasari troops that attacked Malayu and later sided with Wijaya before the foundation of the Majapahit settlement also numbered 10,000. This points to a probable number of 20,000; not including the number of those killed during the fall of Singhasari and the Pamalayu expedition and the number of new troops who came from Madura under Arya Wiraraja.)

Casualties and losses
Yuan dynasty: 12,000–18,000 dead	5,000 dead >100 ships captured	Unknown

The Yuan dynasty under Kublai Khan attempted in 1293 to invade Java, an island in modern Indonesia, with 20,000 to 30,000 soldiers. This was intended as a punitive expedition against Kertanegara of Singhasari, who had refused to pay tribute to the Yuan and maimed one of their emissaries. However, in the intervening years between Kertanegara's refusal and the expedition's arrival on Java, Kertanegara had been killed and Singhasari had been usurped by Kediri. Thus, the Yuan expeditionary force was directed to obtain the submission of its successor state, Kediri, instead. After a fierce campaign, Kediri surrendered, but the Yuan forces were betrayed by their erstwhile ally, Majapahit, under Raden Wijaya. In the end, the invasion ended with Yuan failure and strategic victory for the new state, Majapahit.

== Background ==
Kublai, the founder of the Yuan dynasty, had sent envoys to many states demanding that they pay tributes and submit themselves to Yuan China. Men-shi or Meng-qi (孟琪), one of his ministers, was sent to Java (Singhasari) but was not well received there. The king of Singhasari, Kertanegara, was offended by Men-shi's proposal and branded his face with a hot iron as was done to common thieves, cut his ears, and scornfully sent him on his way. Kublai Khan was shocked and ordered a punitive expedition against Kertanegara, whom he labeled a barbarian, in 1292. The campaign also had other objectives. According to Kublai Khan, if the Yuan forces were able to defeat Singhasari, the other countries around it would submit themselves. The Yuan dynasty could then control the Asian sea trade routes, because of the strategic geographical position of the archipelago in trading.

According to the History of Yuan, 20,000–30,000 men were collected from Fujian, Jiangxi, and Huguang in southern China, along with 500–1,000 ships and enough provisions for a year. The officers were the Han Chinese Shi Bi, the Yugur Yighmish, who were experienced in overseas voyages, and the Han Chinese Gao Xing.

Meanwhile, after defeating Malayu Dharmasraya in Sumatra in 1290, Singhasari became the most powerful kingdom in the region. Kertanegara sent a massive army to Sumatra in the Pamalayu campaign. However, seizing the opportunity of the lack of an army guarding the capital, in 1292 Jayakatwang, the Duke of Kediri (Gelang-gelang), a vassal state of Singhasari, revolted against Kertanegara. Jayakatwang's revolt was assisted by Kertanegara's former close friend, Banyak Wide (also known by his title Arya Wiraraja), who secretly despised Kertanegara since he was removed from being a minister/chamberlain of Singhasari and was sent to Madura as the governor in Sumenep.

The Kediri (Gelang-gelang) army attacked Singhasari simultaneously from both the north and south flanks. The king of Singhasari only noticed the invasion from the north and sent his son-in-law, Nararya Sanggramawijaya (Raden Wijaya), northward to vanquish the rebellion. The northern attack was quashed, but the southern attack under the command of Kebo Mundarang successfully remained undetected until it reached and sacked the unprepared capital city of Kutaraja. Jayakatwang usurped and killed Kertanegara during the Tantra sacred ceremony while drinking palm wine, thus bringing an end to the Singhasari Kingdom. The death of Kertanegara and the fall of Singhasari is recorded in the Gajah Mada inscription in the month of Jyesta in 1214 Saka, which has been interpreted as April–May 1292 or between 18th May and the 15th June of 1292.

Having learned of the fall of the Singhasari capital of Kutaraja to the Kediri rebellion, Raden Wijaya tried to return and defend Singhasari but failed. He and his three colleagues, Rangga Lawe, Sora, and Nambi, went into exile to Madura under the protection of the regent Arya Wiraraja, who then turned to Jayakatwang's side. Kertanegara's son-in-law, Raden Wijaya, submitted to Kediri, and being brokered by Arya Wiraraja he was pardoned by Jayakatwang. Wijaya was then permitted to establish a new settlement in Tarik timberland. The new settlement was named Majapahit, which was taken from maja fruit that had a bitter taste in that timberland (maja is the fruit name and pahit means 'bitter').

=== Military composition ===
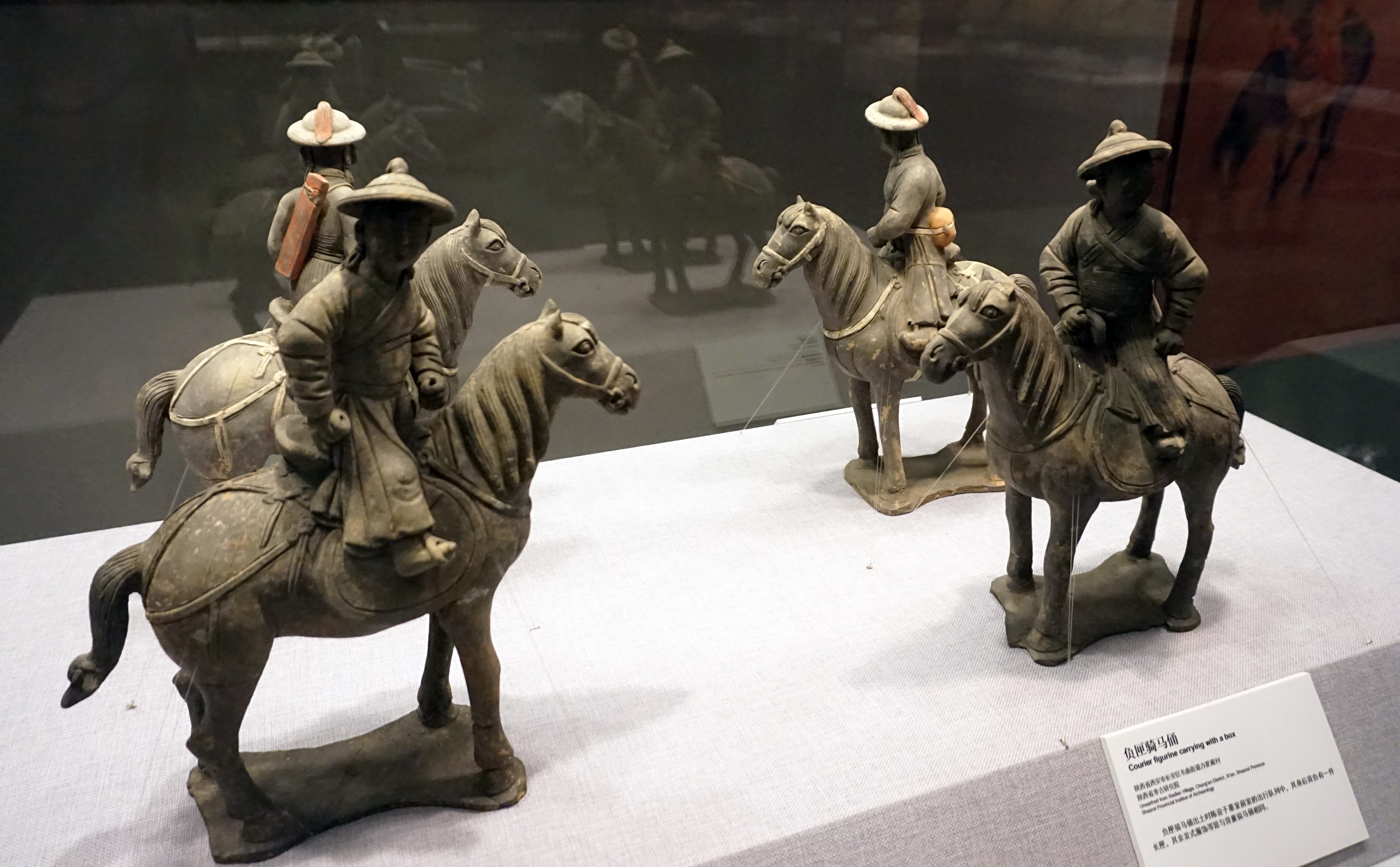
Yuan dynasty Mongol cavalry, from Xi'an, Shaanxi Province, collected by Xi'an Museum.

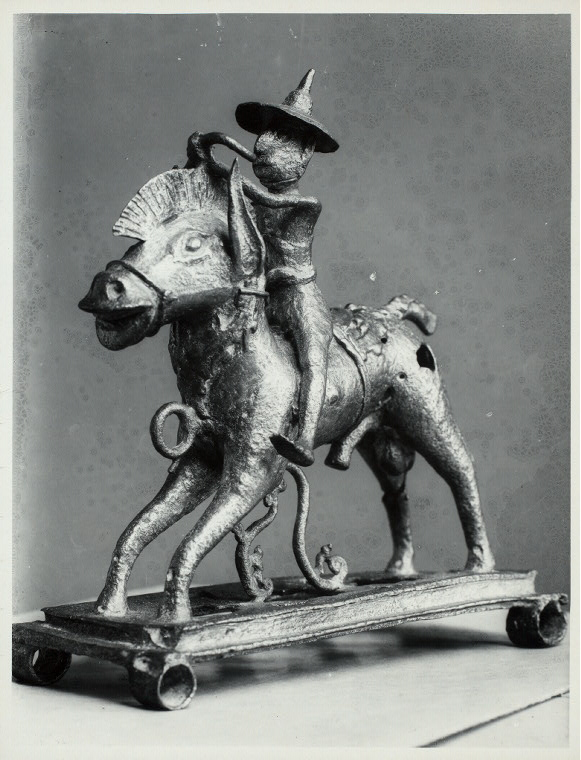
A brass "Tartar rider" toy from Besuki, East Java.

There were 5,000 men commanded by Shi Bi, 2,000 from the garrison in Fujian Province, and soldiers from Jiangxi, Fujian, and Huguang provinces. The personal equipment during the expedition was not explicitly recorded. If the equipment was similar to the Mongol invasion of Japan, the soldiers would have worn light steel helmets and hide armor. The weapons included pikes, battle axes, reflex bows, rockets, and tiě pào (鐵炮 — grenades launched by catapults). Ethnic Mongol soldiers also brought horses. The History of Yuan also mentioned cannon (Chinese: 炮 — Pào). From the record of Ibn Battuta, Chinese ships carried naphtha shooters/throwers. The kind of ships used in the campaign is not mentioned in the History of Yuan, but the norm of Chinese junks pre-1500 was about 20–30 m (65.6–98.4 ft) long. Worcester estimates that the large junks of the Yuan dynasty were 36 feet (10.97 m) in beam and over 100 feet (30.48 m) long. By using the ratio between the number of ships and total soldiers, each ship may have carried a maximum capacity of 30 or 31 men. David Bade estimated a capacity of 20 to 50 men per ship.

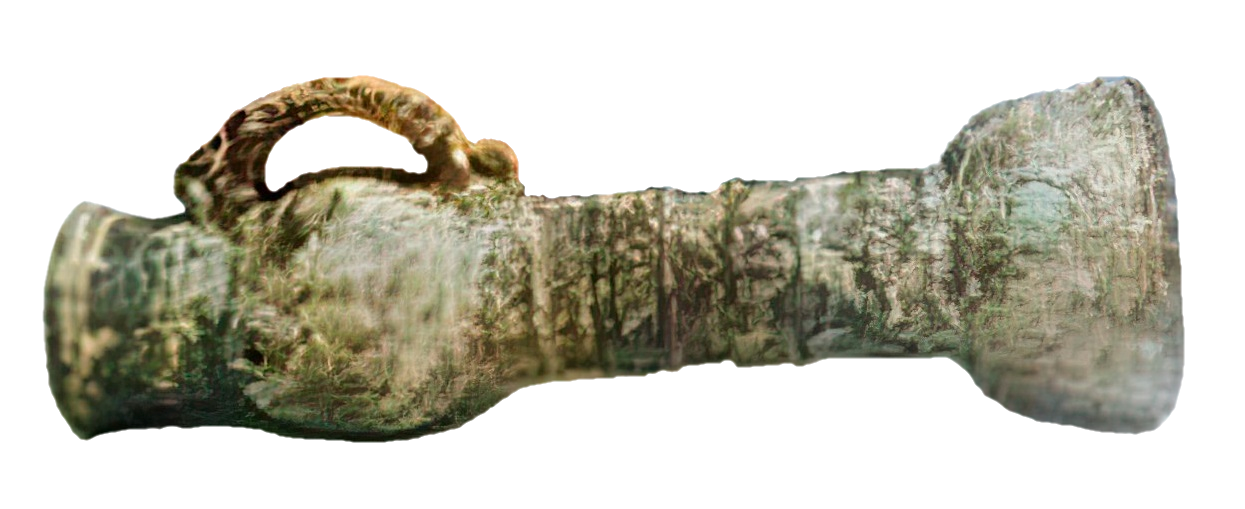
A Chinese-style cannon found in Java, made of bronze and weighs about 15 kg. Unknown origin, it is either Chinese-made or a Javanese copy. It may be used as anti-ship cannon or as a mortar, firing large cannonballs or bombs.

The History of Yuan recorded that the Javanese army had more than 100,000 men. This is now thought to be an exaggerated or mistaken number. Modern estimates place the Javanese forces at around the same size as the Yuan army, of around 20,000 to 30,000 men. (Note: According to Kidung Harsawijaya, during the attack on Singhasari, the Daha troops who attacked from the south numbered 10,000 men; while the northern troops were unspecified. The Singhasari troops that attacked Malayu and later sided with Wijaya before the foundation of the Majapahit settlement also numbered 10,000. This points to a probable number of 20,000; not including the number of those killed during the fall of Singhasari and the Pamalayu expedition and the number of new troops who came from Madura under Arya Wiraraja.) According to a Chinese record, Java already had a standing army, an achievement that only a handful of Southeast Asian empires could aspire to achieve. This army numbered around 30,000 men that were paid in gold, recorded as early as 1225 in Zhu Fan Zhi.

Military forces in various parts of Southeast Asia were lightly armored. As was common in Southeast Asia, most of the Javanese forces were composed of temporarily conscripted commoners (levy) led by the warrior and noble castes. The "peasant army" was usually bare-chested wearing a sarung, and armed with a spear, short sword, or bow and arrows. Their infantry (professional soldiers, not the levy) wore a scale armor called siping-siping, possibly made of brass. The high-ranking soldiers wore a metal breastplate called kawaca. The Javanese navy, however, was more advanced than the Chinese. Javanese junks (jong) were more than 69 to 80 metres (226 to 262 ft) long, able to carry 600–1,000 men, and constructed in multiple thick planks that rendered artillery useless.

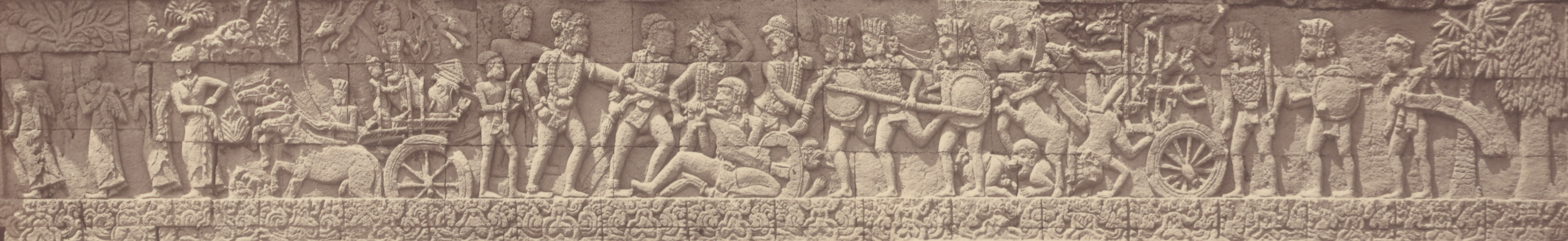
Battle scene from the main temple of Penataran temple complex, 1269 saka or 1347 AD.

== Invasion ==
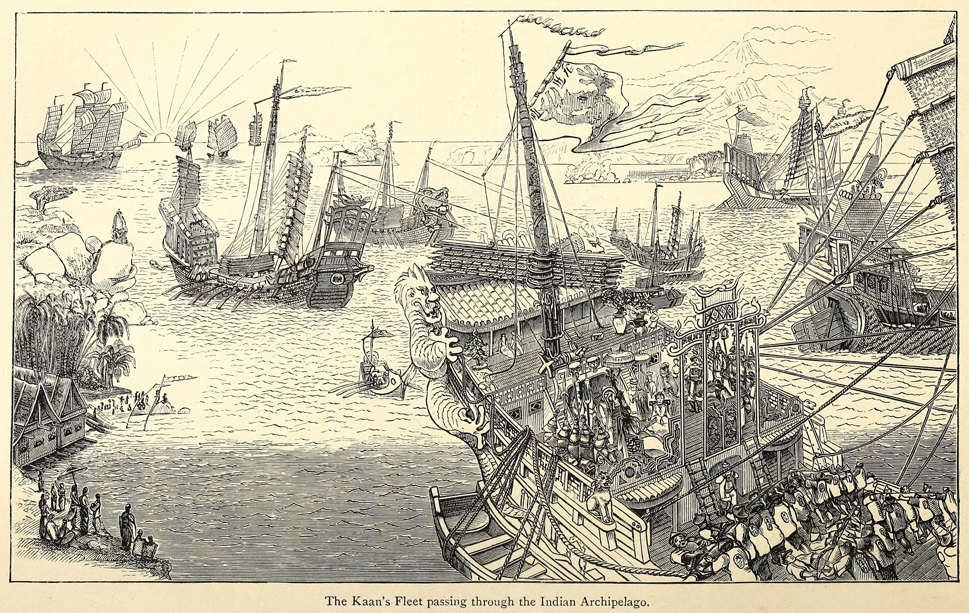
Kublai Khan's fleet passing through the Indonesian archipelago, by Sir Henry Yule (1871)

The order to subdue Java was issued by the Kublai Khan on March 1292. The Yuan forces departed from the southern port of Quanzhou, traveled along the coast of Trần dynasty, Dai Viet and Champa along the way to their primary target. The small states of Malaya and Sumatra submitted and sent envoys to them, and Yuan commanders left darugha there. It is known that the Yuan forces stopped at Ko-lan (Gelam island) to plan their strategy. On 22 January 1293, (Note: The dates in this article are taken from Lo 2012, pp. 303–308 and Hung et al. 2022, p. 7.) Yighmish departed first to bring the Emperor's order to Java. The main fleet then sailed to Karimun Jawa, and from there sailed to Tuban. As noted in Kidung Panji Wijayakrama, they probably pillaged the coastal town of Tuban and the villages surrounding the area. After that, the commanders decided to split the forces into two. The first would advance inland, the second follows them using boats. Shi Bi sailed to the estuary of Sedayu, and from there went to a small river called Kali Mas (a tributary of Brantas River). Land troops under Gao Xing and Yighmish, which consisted of cavalry and infantry, went to Du-Bing-Zu. Three commanders sailed using fast boats from Sedayu to Majapahit's floating bridge and then joined with the main troops on the way to Kali Mas River.

=== Arrival ===
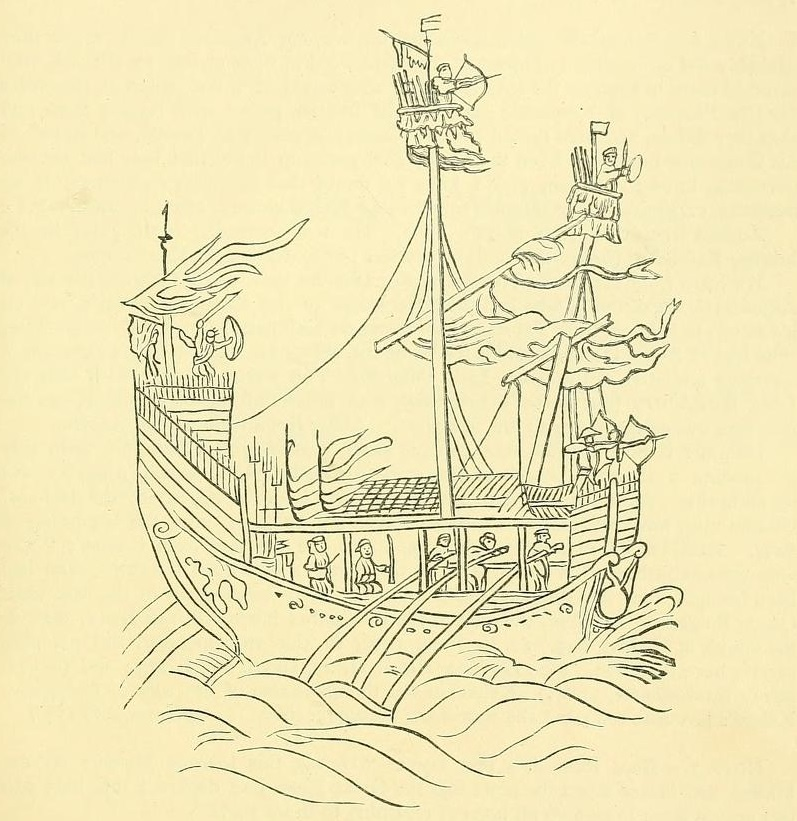
Painting of a 14th-century Yuan junk. Yuan naval armada consisted of this kind of ship.

When the Yuan army arrived in Java, Raden Wijaya sent an envoy from Madura and informed them that Kertanagara had been killed in a palace coup and the usurper, Jayakatwang, currently ruled in his place. Wijaya allied himself with the army to fight against Jayakatwang and gave the Mongols a map of the country Kalang (Gelang-gelang, another name for Kediri). According to the History of Yuan, Wijaya attacked Jayakatwang without success when he heard of the arrival of the Yuan navy. Then he requested their aid. In return, Yuan generals demanded his submission to their emperor, and he gave it. Raden Wijaya promised a tribute including two princesses should the army succeed in destroying Kediri.

=== Battle of the Kali Mas ===
On the 22nd March, all of the troops gathered in Kali Mas. At the headwaters of the river was the palace of the Tumapel (Singhasari) king. This river was the entryway to Java, and here they decided to battle. A Javanese minister blocked the river using boats. The Yuan commanders then made a crescent-shaped encampment at the bank of the river. They instructed the waterborne troops, cavalry, and infantry to move forward together. The minister abandoned his boats and fled in the night. More than 100 large boats with a devil head at the bow were seized by Yuan forces.

A large portion of the army was tasked to guard the estuary of Kali Mas; meanwhile, the main troops advanced. Raden Wijaya's messenger said that the king of Kediri had chased him to Majapahit and begged the Yuan army to protect him. Because the position of Kediri's army couldn't be determined, the Yuan army returned to Kali Mas. Upon hearing information from Yighmish that the enemy's army would arrive that night, the Yuan army departed for Majapahit.

==== Attack by the Kediri ====
On the 14th April, Kediri's army arrived from 3 directions to attack Wijaya. In the morning of the 15th April, Yighmish led his troops to attack the enemy in the southwest, but couldn't find them. Gao Xing battled the enemy in the southeast, eventually forcing them to flee into the mountains. Near midday, enemy troops came from the southeast. Gao Xing attacked again and managed to defeat them in the evening.

=== Battle of the Brantas ===
On the 22nd April, the troops split into 3 to attack Kediri, and it was agreed that on the 26th April they would meet up in Daha to begin the attack after hearing cannon fire. The first troops sailed along the river. The second troops led by Yighmish marched along the eastern riverbank while the third army led by Gao Xing marched along the western riverbank. Raden Wijaya and his troops marched in the rear.

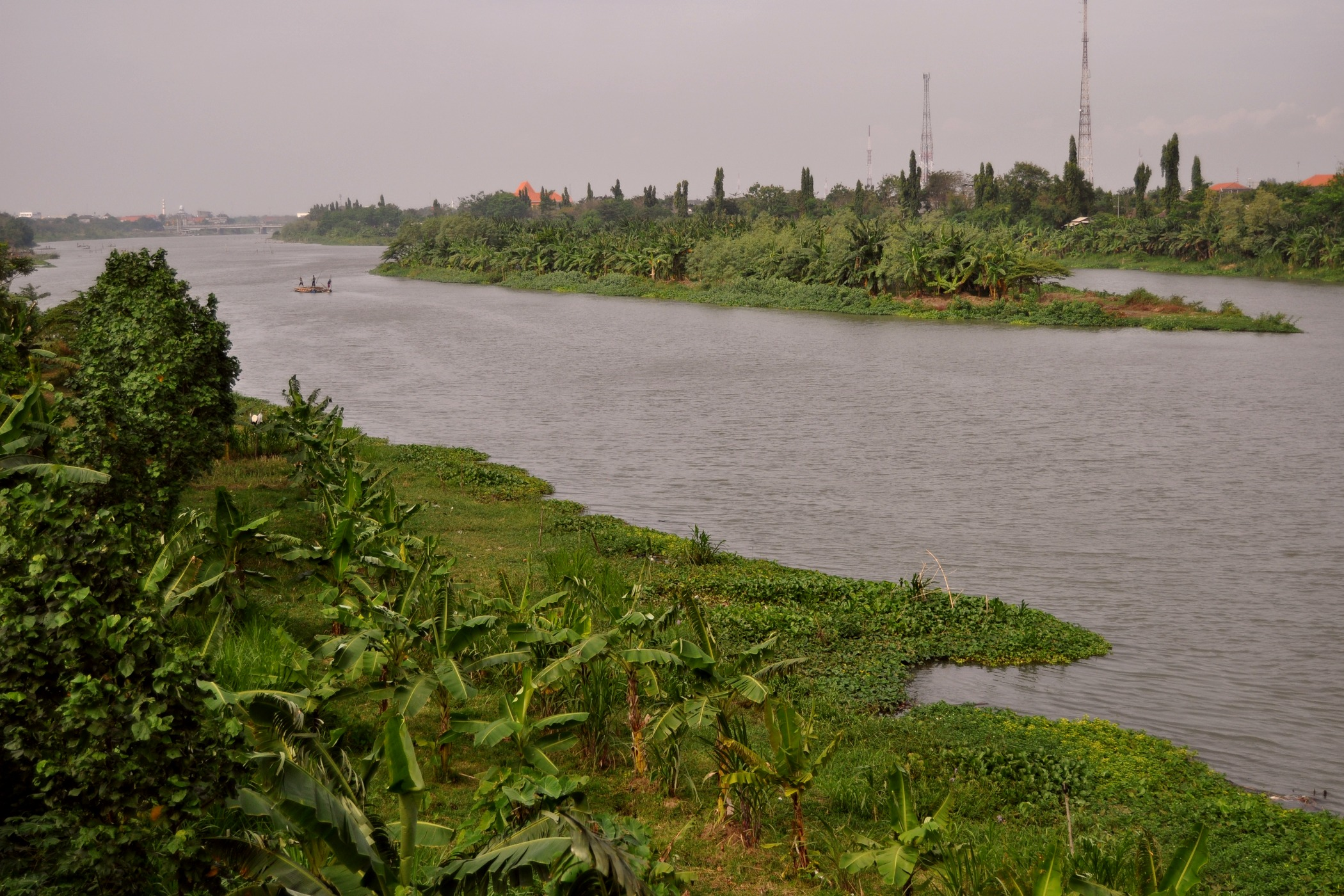
21st-century view of Brantas river in Kediri.

==== Battle of Daha ====
The army arrived at Daha on the 26th April. The prince of Kediri defended the city with his troops. The battle lasted from 6:00 am to 14:00 pm. After attacking 3 times, Kediri forces were defeated and fled. At the same time that the Mongol and Kediri forces clashed, Majapahit forces attacked the city from another (Note: From the south according to Kidung Panji Wijayakrama, or east according to Pararaton. Nevertheless Kidung Panji Wijayakrama indicated there is a clash in the east too.) side and quickly defeated the guards. Raden Wijaya went into the palace and freed the princess which has been taken captive by Jayakatwang and her two handmaidens. A few thousand Kediri troops tried to cross the river but drowned while 5,000 were killed in the battle. King Jayakatwang retreated to his fortress only to find out that his palace had been burned. The Yuan army then rounded up Daha and called on the king to surrender. In the afternoon, Jayakatwang declared his submission to the Mongols. The Yuan army captured Jayakatwang, his son, his wife and all his officers. Kebo Mundarang, who battled in the south, was defeated and fled, only to be captured by Sora. He was brought to a plain and executed. (Note: According to Pararaton, Kebo Mundarang battled in the east. He was pursued by Rangga Lawe to a place called Trinipanti valley and killed.)

=== Wijaya's ambushes against Yuan ===
Once Jayakatwang had been captured by Yuan forces, Raden Wijaya returned to Majapahit, ostensibly to prepare his tribute settlement, and leaving his allies to celebrate their victory. Shi Bi and Yighmish allowed Raden Wijaya to go back to his country to prepare his tribute and a new letter of submission, but Gao Xing disliked the idea and he warned the other two. Wijaya asked the Yuan forces to come to his country unarmed, as the princesses could not stand the sight of weapons.

Two hundred unarmed Yuan soldiers led by two officers were sent to Raden Wijaya's country, but on the 26th May Raden Wijaya quickly mobilized his forces again and ambushed the Yuan convoy. After that Raden Wijaya marched his forces to the main Yuan camp and launched a surprise attack, killing many and sending the rest running back to their ships. Shi Bi was left behind and cut off from the rest of his army, and was obliged to fight his way eastward through 123 km of hostile territory. (Note: The distance is written as 300 li in the Account of Shi Bi, History of the Yuan dynasty book 162. See Groeneveldt 1876, p. 27.) Raden Wijaya did not engage the Mongols head-on; instead, he used all possible tactics to harass and reduce the enemy army bit by bit. During the rout, the Yuan army lost a part of the spoils that had been captured beforehand.

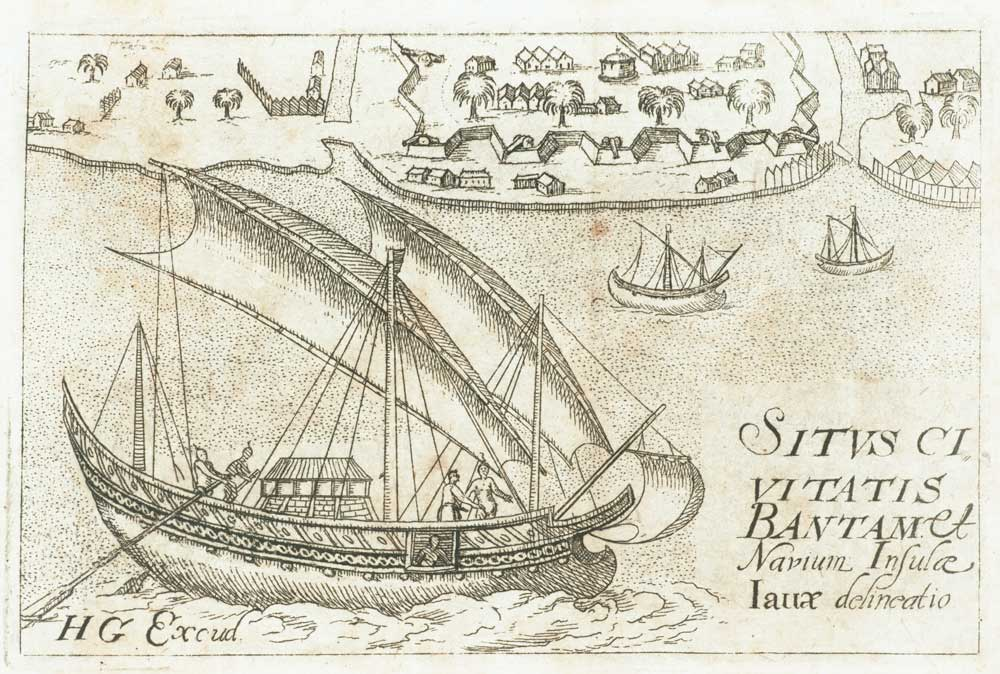
Three-masted Javanese jong in Banten, this illustration is from 1610.

The Yuan forces had to withdraw in confusion, as the monsoon winds to carry them home would soon end, leaving them to wait on a hostile island for six months. Jayakatwang composed Kidung Wukir Polaman during captivity in Jung Galuh, but the Mongols killed him and his son before they departed. They sailed back on the 31st May to Quanzhou in 68 days. The Kudadu inscription hints at a battle between the Javanese fleet commanded by rakryan mantri Arya Adikara (Note: An alternate name of Banyak Wide, also known as Arya Wiraraja.) and the Mongol-Chinese fleet. Kidung Panji Wijayakrama indicated that Mongol ships were either destroyed or captured. Shi Bi's troops lost more than 3,000 soldiers. Modern research by Nugroho estimated 60% of the Yuan army was killed (with total losses of 12,000–18,000 soldiers), with an unknown number of soldiers taken prisoner and an unknown number of ships destroyed or captured. In early August 1293, the army arrived in China. They brought Jayakatwang's children and some of his officers, numbering more than 100. They also acquired the nation's map, population registration, and a letter with golden writings from the king of Muli/Buli (probably Bali). They captured loot in form of valuables, incenses, perfumes, and textiles; all are counted to be worth more than 500,000 taels of silver.

== Aftermath ==
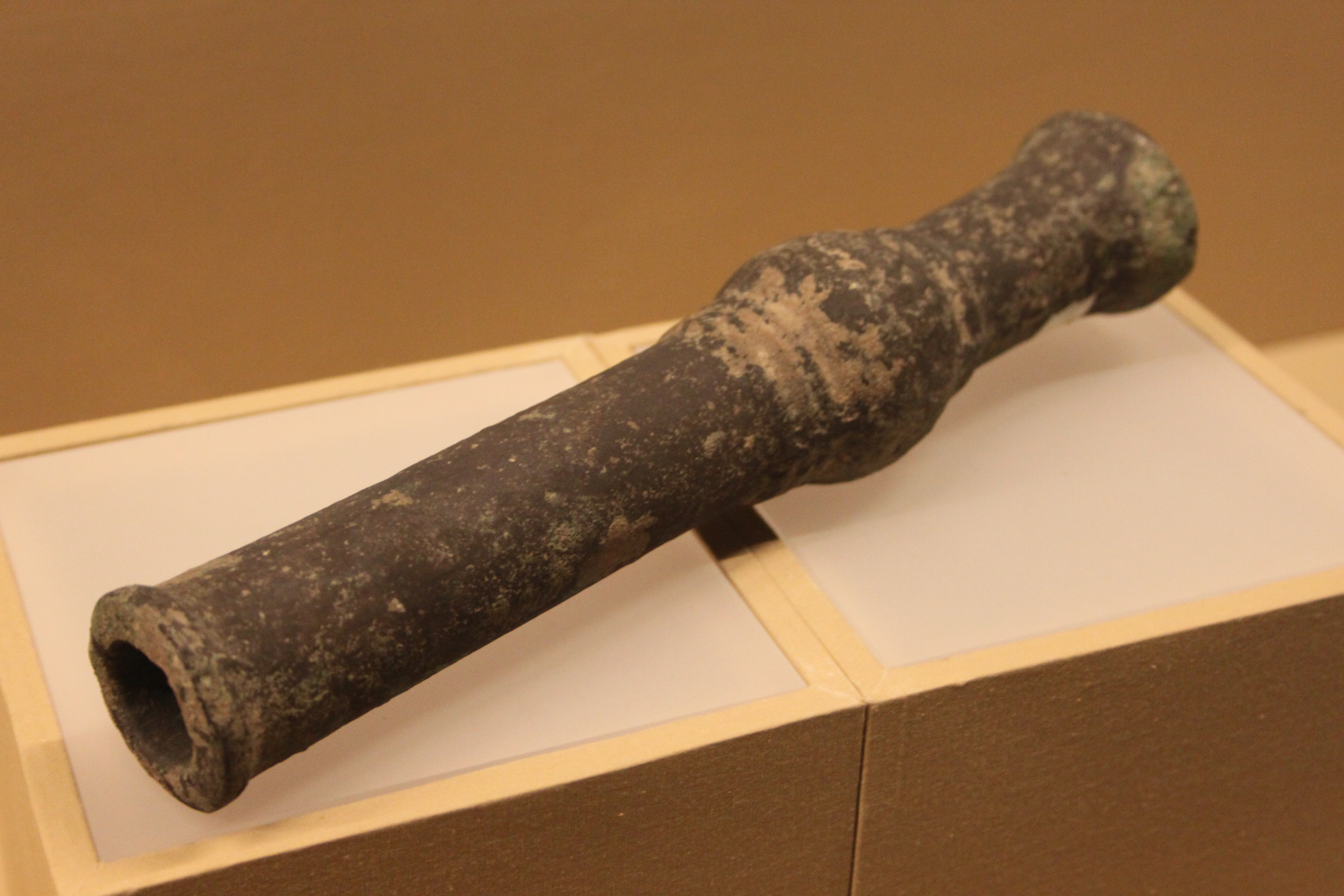
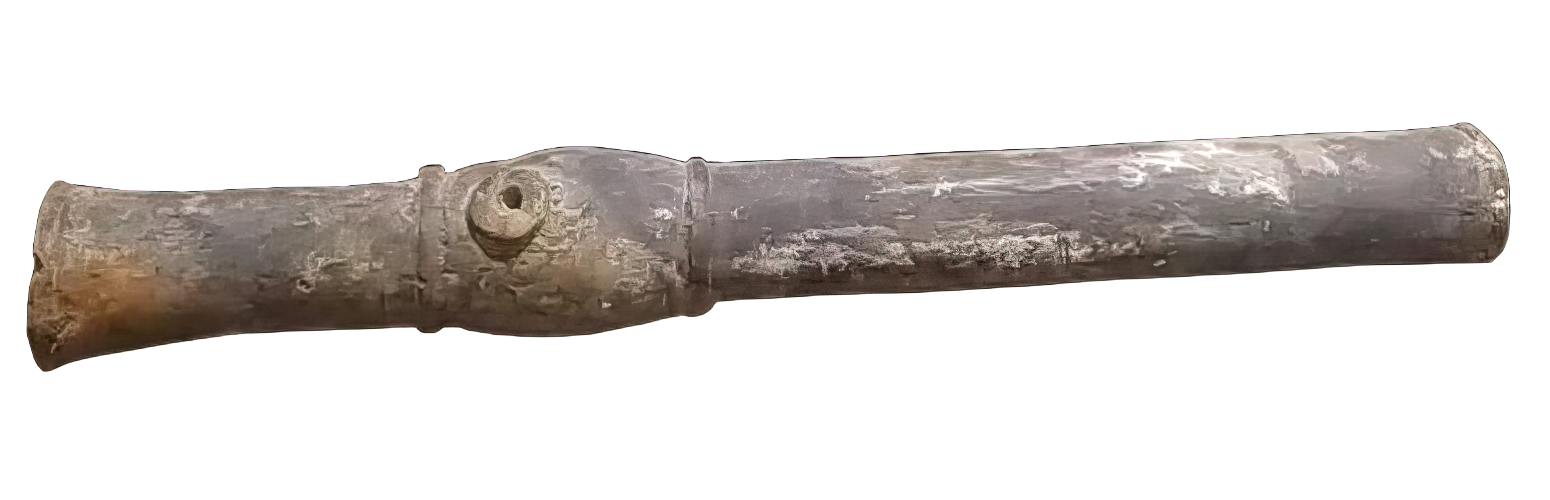
Hand cannons:
- Yuan dynasty bronze hand cannon, Xi'an, China.
- Bronze hand cannon cetbang, found in the Brantas river, Jombang.

The three Yuan generals, demoralized by the considerable loss of their elite soldiers due to the ambush, returned to their empire with the surviving soldiers. Upon their arrival, Shi Bi was condemned to receive seventy lashes and have a third of his property confiscated for allowing the catastrophe. Yighmish also was reprimanded and a third of his property was confiscated. But Gao Xing was awarded 50 taels of gold for protecting the soldiers from a total disaster. Later, Shi Bi and Yighmish were shown mercy, and the emperor restored their reputation and property.

This failure was the last expedition in Kublai Khan's reign. Majapahit, in contrast, became the most powerful state of its era in the region. Kublai Khan summoned his minister, Liu Guojie, to prepare another invasion of Java with a 100,000-strong army, but this plan was canceled after his death. Travelers passing the region, such as Ibn Battuta and Odoric of Pordenone, however, noted that Java had been unsuccessfully attacked by the Mongols several times. The Gunung Butak inscription from 1294 may have mentioned that Arya Adikara intercepted a further Mongol invasion and defeated it before landing in Java.

This invasion may have involved the first use of gunpowder in the Nusantara archipelago. After this invasion, Chinese shipbuilding techniques were absorbed by Javanese shipbuilders. A new type of jong appeared, called the Sino-Southeast Asian hybrid jong, they mixed Chinese techniques in their manufacture, namely the usage of iron nails alongside wooden dowels, and also the addition of watertight bulkheads and a central rudder.

== Legacy ==
The Mongols left two inscriptions on the Serutu Island on February 25, 1293. The inscriptions were called the Pasir Kapal and the Pasir Cina inscriptions.

== See also ==
- Jayakatwang rebellion, the rebellion that brought down Singhasari
- Battle of Genter, Ken Arok's rebellion that brought down Kediri
- Mongol invasions of Vietnam
- Mongol invasions of Japan
- Cetbang, Majapahit gunpowder powder whose technology was obtained from this incursion
- Bedil, a term for gunpowder-based weapon of the region

== Sources ==
- Averoes, Muhammad (2022). "Re-Estimating the Size of Javanese Jong Ship". HISTORIA: Jurnal Pendidik Dan Peneliti Sejarah. 5 (1): 57–64. doi:10.17509/historia.v5i1.39181. S2CID 247335671.
- Bade, David W. (2013), Of Palm Wine, Women and War: The Mongolian Naval Expedition to Java in the 13th Century, Singapore: Institute of Southeast Asian Studies
- Bowring, Philip (2019), Empire of the Winds: The Global Role of Asia's Great Archipelago, London, New York: I.B. Tauris & Co. Ltd, ISBN 978-1-78831-446-6
- Burnet, Ian (2015), Archipelago: A Journey Across Indonesia, Rosenberg Publishing
- Groeneveldt, Willem Pieter (1876), Notes on the Malay Archipelago and Malacca Compiled from Chinese Sources, Batavia: W. Bruining This article incorporates text from this source, which is in the public domain.
- Hung, Hsiao-chun; Hartatik; Ma'rifat, Tisna Arif; Simanjuntak, Truman (2022), "Mongol fleet on the way to Java: First archaeological remains from the Karimata Strait in Indonesia", Archaeological Research in Asia, 29 100327, doi:10.1016/j.ara.2021.100327, hdl:1885/294251, S2CID 244553201
- Jákl, Jiří (2014). Literary Representations of War and Warfare in Old Javanese Kakawin Poetry (PhD thesis). The University of Queensland.
- Lo, Jung-pang (2012) [1957], Elleman, Bruce A. (ed.), China as Sea Power 1127-1368: A Preliminary Survey of the Maritime Expansion and Naval Exploits of the Chinese People During the Southern Song and Yuan Periods, Singapore: NUS Press
- Man, John (2007), Kublai Khan: The Mongol king who remade China, London: Bantam Books, ISBN 978-0-553-81718-8
- Miksic, John Norman (2013), Singapore and the Silk Road of the Sea, 1300–1800, Singapore: NUS Press, ISBN 978-9971-69-558-3
- Muljana, Raden Benedictus Slamet (2005) [1965], Menuju Puncak Kemegahan (Sejarah Kerajaan Majapahit), Yogyakarta: LKiS Pelangi Aksara
- Nugroho, Irawan Djoko (2011), Majapahit Peradaban Maritim, Jakarta: Suluh Nuswantara Bakti, ISBN 978-602-9346-00-8
- Nugroho, Irawan Djoko (2009), Meluruskan Sejarah Majapahit, Ragam Media
- Poesponegoro, Marwati Djoened; Notosusanto, Nugroho (2019) [2008], Sejarah Nasional Indonesia Edisi Pemutakhiran Jilid 2: Zaman Kuno, Jakarta: Balai Pustaka
