= Battle of Genter =

Battle

Date	1221–1222
Location	East Java
Result	Tumapel victory; Establishment of Rajasa dynasty
Territorial changes	Kediri Kingdom were collapsed, Tumapel were established by Ken Arok

Belligerents
Tumapel	Kediri Kingdom

Commanders and leaders
Ken Arok	Kertajaya X: Mahisa Walungan †; Gubar Baleman †

The Battle of Genter, also known as the Battle of Ganter, was a military engagement fought between two rival Javanese rulers in the early 13th century. The battle resulted in one ruler, Ken Arok, defeating his rival and routing their army. The battle cemented Arok's control over Eastern Java, and resulted in the ruler founding the Rajasa dynasty.

== History ==
From the 8th to the 12th century, the island of Java was ruled by a number of kings and noble families. In the eastern part of the island, agriculture-centric feudal nations (namely the Sailendra, Kediri, Tumapel, and Majapahit kingdoms) intermittently fought over arable land on which to grow rice. In the early 13th century, these combatants were challenged by the emergence of a new political force in the region. This challenger came in the form of Ken Arok, a peasant-turned village chief who sought to increase his political power; later Javanese folklore surrounding the figure would add that Arok was endowed with a great sense of personal ambition. Arok succeeded in aligning his village with the Kingdom of Tumapel, and in doing so became an important adviser the nation's king, Tunggul Ametung. After a series of machinations, Arok became king himself after he avenged Tunggul by killing the latter's assassin; some stories speculate that Arok arranged this same assassination or killed Ametung himself.

Having replaced Ametung as King of Tumapel, Arok began to consolidate his military and political power to make war against the Kingdom of Kediri, Tumapel's longtime rival. The king of Kediri, Kertajaya, likewise marshaled his forces and prepared to meet Arok in battle. The climactic engagement of the conflict took place in either 1221 or 1222 at a place called Genter (also called Ganter) in eastern Kediri. During the battle, Arok defeated Kertajaya (either by killing him or forcing him to surrender), causing the rout of the Kedirian army.

The battle fought at Genter marked the end of the Kingdom of Kediri. On the opposing side, the victory of his forces at the Battle of Genter allowed for Arok to establish his own royal line; this lineage became the Rajasa dynasty, which ruled over the Kingdom of Singhasari.
