= Gayatri Rajapatni =

Gayatri
- Çri Rajapatniçwari
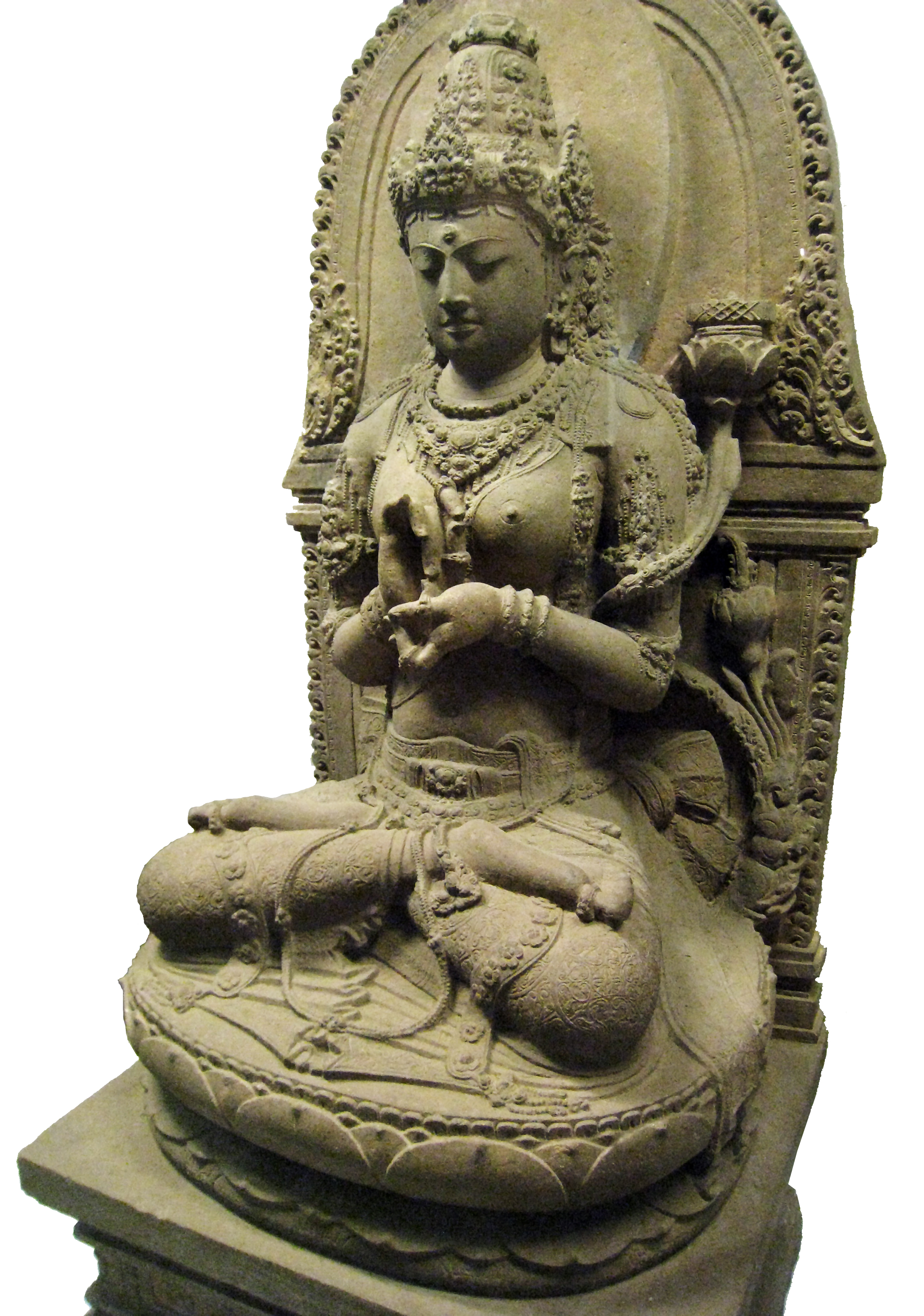
- Although popularly believed that the East Javanese statue of Prajnaparamita was the personification of Ken Dedes, queen of Singhasari, other recent opinion suggested that it was probably the deified personification of Gayatri Rajapatni instead.

Queen Consort of Majapahit
- Tenure: 1294 – 1309
- Successor: Kertawardhana (as Prince Consort)
- Born: Dyah Gayatri c. 1276; Kingdom of Singhasari
- Died: 1350
- Burial: Prajñaparamitapuri, Kamal Pandak, Kingdom of Majapahit
- Spouse: Kertarajasa Jayawardhana, 1st King of Majapahit
- Issue: Tribhuwannotunggadewi, 2nd Queen of Majapahit; Rajadewi Maharajasa, 2nd Princess of Daha
Names
- Sri Rajendra Dyah Dewi Gayatri
- House: Rajasa
- Father: Kertanegara, 5th King of Singhasari
- Mother: Bajradewi
- Religion: Buddhism

Gayatri Rajapatni (c.1276—1350) was the queen consort of Majapahit's founder and first king Kertarajasa Jayawardhana, and also the mother of Tribhuwana Wijayatunggadewi, the queen regnant of Majapahit. A devout Buddhist, she was the youngest daughter of Kertanegara, king of Singhasari.

She was an influential figure within Majapahit's inner palace and later in her life acted as the matriarch of Majapahit's Rajasa dynasty. Tradition describes her as a woman of extraordinary beauty with exceptional charm, wisdom, and intelligence.

== Early life ==
Gayatri was raised as a princess in Tumapel palace, Kutaraja, the capital of Singhasari kingdom, East Java. Her name is derived from Gayatri, the Hindu goddess personification of hymns and mantras. She was the youngest daughter of King Kertanegara. Her siblings are Tribhuwaneswari the oldest, Prajnaparamitha, and Narendra Duhita. Kertanegara did not have any son as his heir. Instead, he had four daughters, dubbed as the four Princesses of Singhasari. King Kertanegara was well known as a pious adherent of Tantric Buddhism. It is highly possible that Gayatri was also exposed to Buddhist ideas and adhered to the religion. Gayatri's eldest sibling, Tribhuwaneswari was betrothed to Prince Nararya Sangramawijaya (Raden Wijaya), a relative of Kertanegara's extended family, and probably groomed to be his successor. According to tradition, Gayatri was mentioned as a keen and bright student in literature, social, political, and religious matters.

In 1292 Gayatri witnessed the destruction of her home, the Singhasari kingdom, under the unsuspected attack of Jayakatwang, Duke of Gelang-gelang (Kediri). She survived and escaped unharmed from the burning palace. Afterward, she discarded her identity, hiding and blending herself among the captured servants and slaves. Her eldest sister, Tribhuwana, managed to escape and reunited with her husband, Raden Wijaya. Her other sisters, Prajnaparamitha, and Narendra Duhita, were captured by enemy forces and held hostage in Kediri. For about a year she hid herself in the Kediri palace in disguise as a servant.

George Coedes contends Raden Vijaya and Gayatri Rajapatni were married before the Jayakatwang revolt, during which she was killed.

In 1293, Raden Wijaya used the aid of invading Mongol forces to destroy Jayakatwang forces in Kediri, and liberated Gayatri and rescued her captured sisters. Prince Nararya Sangrama Wijaya ascended to the throne in regnal name as King Kertarajasa Jayawardhana in November 1293, and established the Majapahit kingdom. He took Gayatri as his wife, as well as Gayatri's sisters Prajnaparamitha, and Narendra Duhita, concluding all of Kertanegara's daughters as his consorts. This action was probably motivated to strengthen his claim to the throne as the sole successor of Kertanegara by removing possible contests of the princess's suitors. Another opinion suggested that his marriage to Prajnaparamita and Narendra Duhita was just a formality, an act of compassion to save the family's reputation since it was probable that during their captivity in Kediri, the two princesses suffered severe abuses and harassment that physically and psychologically scarred them beyond marriage.

== Life as queen consort ==
Gayatri was one of King Kertarajasa's five wives. Other than Gayatri's three sisters, the Kertanegara's daughters princesses of Singhasari, Kertarajasa also took Dara Petak, the princess of Malayu Dharmasraya kingdom as his wife, and named her Indreswari. Among these queens, only she and Indreswari bore Kertarajasa's children, while Tribhuwaneswari, Kertarajasa's first wife and other wives seem to be barren. Indreswari bore Kertarajasa a son and thus an heir, Jayanegara, while Gayatri bore him two daughters, Princess Gitarja and Rajadewi.

The tradition describes Gayatri as Kertarajasa's favourite, thus earning her a new name "Rajapatni" or "Raja's (king's) consort or companion". The couple is praised as a perfect match, as far as comparing the couple as the incarnation of the celestial couple of Shiva and Parvati. She seems to take an interest in Adityawarman, Jayanegara's cousin of Malayu Dharmasraya lineage. She carefully saw through Adityawarman's education and career development and became his sponsor and patron.

== Life as queen dowager ==
After the death of her husband, King Kertarajasa in 1309, Gayatri's stepson, Jayanegara, rose to become the next monarch. During Jayanegara's reign, Gayatri seems to take the role of dowager queen, as an influential matriarch figure of Majapahit's inner circle within the palace. During these years she oversaw the rise of capable Gajah Mada's career, and probably became his sponsor, patron and protector, recruiting Gajah Mada into her daughter, Tribhuwana Wijayatunggadewi's side as a trusted officer.

== Later life ==
At a certain point of time during the last years of Jayanegara's reign, Gayatri renounced her worldly affairs and retired as a Bhikkuni (Buddhist nun). After the death of Jayanegara in 1328, she was then the sole surviving elder of the Majapahit royal family since her sisters and Indreswari had all already died. Responsible for the succession of the Majapahit throne, Gayatri appointed her daughter Tribhuwana Wijayatunggadewi to rule the kingdom on her behalf in 1329.

In 1350, Gayatri Rajapatni died in her vihara (monastery). In the aftermath, Queen regnant Tribhuwana Wijayatunggadewi abdicated her throne in favor of her son, Hayam Wuruk, who ascended the throne in the same year. Her death marked the ascension of Hayam Wuruk to the throne because Tribhuwana Tunggadewi had only become queen regnant on behalf of Gayatri.

The Nagarakretagama, written in 1365 by Prapanca during the reign of Hayam Wuruk, Gayatri's grandson, describes the elaborate and solemn Sraddha ceremony dedicated to the departed spirit of revered Gayatri Rajapatni. She was enshrined in several temples and posthumously portrayed as Prajnaparamita, the Mahayana Buddhist female Bodhisattva of transcendental wisdom. Some inscription mentions the lofty offering and ceremony performed by Adityawarman and Gajah Mada to honor the spirit of the late Gayatri Rajapatni, suggesting that both men owed their careers to Gayatri Rajapatni's patronage.

== Ancestry ==
Bhatara Anusapati; 2nd King of Singhasari
Seminingrat; Wisnuwardhana; 4th King of Singhasari
Kertanegara; 5th Great King of Singhasari
Waning Hyun; Jayawardhani
Dyah Gayatri; Rajapatni
Bajradewi
