= Hayam Wuruk =

Javanese Hindu emperor (1334–1389)

Dyah Hayam Wuruk
- Çri Nata Rajasanagara; Çri Nata Wilwatikta

4th Maharaja of Majapahit
- Reign: 1350 – 1389
- Predecessor: Tribhuwana Wijayatunggadewi
- Successor: Vikramavardhana

2nd Prince of Kahuripan
- Reign: ca. 1334 – 1350
- Predecessor: Tribhuwana Wijayatunggadewi
- Successor: Tribhuwana Wijayatunggadewi
- Born: Dyah Hayam Wuruk; 1334; Kingdom of Majapahit
- Died: 1389 (aged 54–55); Kingdom of Majapahit
- Spouse: Paduka Sori (d. 1388)
- Issue: Kusumawardhani, 3rd Princess of Lasem; 2nd Prince of Wirabhumi
Names
- Paduka Śri Tiktawilwanāgareśwāra Śrī Rājasanāgara nāmārājabhiṣeka Garbhotpattinama Dyah Sri Hayamwuruk
Regnal name
- Çri Rajasanagara Jayawishnuwardhana ꦯꦿꦶꦬꦗꦯꦟꦓꦬꦗꦪꦮꦶꦯ꧀ꦲ꧀ꦟꦸꦮꦂꦝꦟ
Posthumous name
- Bhatāra Hyang Wekas ing Sukha
- House: Rajasa
- Father: Kertawardhana Dyah Cakradhara, 1st Prince of Tumapel
- Mother: Queen Tribhuwana Tunggadewī

Hayam Vuruk (Indonesian: Hayam Wuruk; Sanskrit: हयम् वुरुक्; Javanese: ꦲꦪꦩ꧀ꦮꦸꦫꦸꦏ꧀) (1334–1389), also called Rajasanagara, Pa-ta-na-pa-na-wu, or Bhatara Prabhu after 1350, was a Javanese Hindu emperor from the Rajasa dynasty and the 4th emperor of the Majapahit Empire. Together with his prime minister Gajah Mada, he reigned the empire at the time of its greatest power. During his reign, the Hindu epics, the Ramayana and the Mahabharata, became ingrained in the culture and worldview of the Javanese through the wayang kulit (leather puppets). He was preceded by Tribhuwana Wijayatunggadewi, and succeeded by his son-in-law Wikramawardhana.

Most of the accounts of his life were taken from the Nagarakretagama, a eulogy to Hayam Wuruk, and the Pararaton ("Book of Kings"), a Javanese historical chronicle.

== Early life ==
According to the Nagarakretagama, Canto 1, Stanzas 4 and 5, he was born in 1256 Saka year, corresponding to 1334 CE, the same year that Mount Kelud erupted. Mpu Prapanca, author of the Nagarakretagama, argued that this was the divine sign that Batara Girinata (the Javanese name for Shiva Mahadewa) had manifested himself on earth, reincarnated as the Javanese king.

His birth name was Hayam Wuruk, preceded by the title dyah, indicating noble status. Hayam Wuruk's name can be translated as "scholar rooster". He was the only son of Queen regnant Tribhuwanotunggadewi and Prince Kertawardhana (or Cakradhara). His mother was the daughter of King Kertarajasa Jayawardhana, founder of Majapahit, while his father was the Prince of Tumapel "Bhre Tumapel", a lesser king of Singhasari. During Queen Tribhuwana's reign, he was also called Kumararaja Jiwana, which means Viceroy of Jiwana or Kahuripan. He had a younger sister named Dyah Nertaja, styled as the Princess of Pajang. The Princess of Pajang was mentioned as a daughter of (Kerta)wardhana in Nagarakretagama, thus making it obvious that she was Hayam Wuruk's biological sister, whose royal name was Wardhanaduhiteswari, in which Krom interpreted as "The illustrious Wardhana's daughter, Iswari". However, Nagarakretagama also mentioned another name as the younger sister of Hayam Wuruk, even earlier than Iswari, she was Rajasaduhitendudewi "The ilustrious Rajasa's daughter, Indudewi", daughter of (Wijaya)rajasa as well as the Princess of Lasem. From this evidence, we can guess that Nagarakretagama's writer means that Indudewi was Hayam Wuruk's younger cousin. In contrast, Pararaton said that Hayam Wuruk's aunt Rajadewi and Wijayarajasa's marriage didn't produce any children.

Both the Pararaton and the Nagarakretagama praised Hayam Wuruk as a handsome, bright, talented, and exceptional student in the courtly martial arts of archery and fencing, who also mastered politics, scriptures, arts, and music. He was known as an accomplished ceremonial dancer in the court, and some accounts tell of his performances in the traditional ceremonial Javanese mask dance. His mother, Queen Tribhuwana, educated and groomed him to become the next monarch of Majapahit.

== Reign ==
In 1350, Queen Dowager Gayatri died in her retirement at a Buddhist monastery. She was the primary consort of King Kertarajasa Jayawardhana, the first king of Majapahit, and also the grandmother of Hayam Wuruk. Queen Tribhuwana had to abdicate because she ruled Majapahit under Gayatri's auspices, and was obliged to relinquish the throne to her son.

Prince Hayam Wuruk inherited the throne in 1350 at the age of 16 under his new regnal name Sri Rajasanagara Jayawishnuwardhana. At that time, mahapatih (prime minister) Gajah Mada was at the height of his career. Under his rule, Majapahit extended its power throughout the Indonesian archipelago of Nusantara. In 1365 (1287 Saka year), Mpu Prapanca wrote the kakawin of Nagarakretagama, the old Javanese eulogy for King Hayam Wuruk. The manuscript described Hayam Wuruk's royal excursion around the Majapahit realm to visit villages, holy shrines, vassal kingdoms, and territory in East Java. He sent ambassadors to China from 1370 to 1381.

== Personal life ==
Genealogy diagram of Rajasa dynasty, the royal family of Singhasari and Majapahit. Rulers are highlighted with period of reign.

According to the Pararaton and Kidung Sunda, in 1357, King Hayam Wuruk was expected to marry Dyah Pitaloka Citraresmi, a daughter of King Linggabuana of the united Sunda Kingdom and Galuh Kingdom. She was described as a princess with extraordinary beauty, but the reason for this royal engagement was probably political, to foster the alliance between the Majapahit and the Sundanese Kingdoms. However, in the Bubat incident, the Sunda royal family and their guards were involved in a skirmish with Majapahit troops. The planned royal wedding ended in disaster with the death of the princess and the whole Sunda royal party. Pitaloka committed suicide at about 17 years old. The court officials blamed Gajah Mada, since he intended to demand submission from the Sunda Kingdom which ended in bloodshed.

After all, Hayam Wuruk married his relative, Paduka Sori. She was a daughter of Wijayarajasa by a concubine, making her a stepdaughter of Hayam Wuruk's maternal aunt. Although all the king's daughters and concubines were beautiful, Queen Sori was a beautiful one. She was linked as Susumna.

They had a daughter, Princess Kusumawardhani, who bestowed the title Princess of Kabalan. King Rajasanagara arranged for her to marry her cousin, Wikramawardhana, Prince of Mataram when he was no older than 12 and she was no older than 7 at that time. His mother was Hayam Wuruk's sister, Princess Iswari. She was described as a perfect princess with beautiful eyes and slender arches, as well as praised because of her beauty. Upon Wikramawardhana's reigned, she was mentioned as Bhre Lasem Sang Ahayu "the Fair Princess of Lasem" in Pararaton.

However, from a concubine, Hayam Wuruk had a son, the 2nd Prince of Wirabhumi (his birth name was unknown), granted the title from his marriage to his cousin, Nagarawardhani, 1st Princess of Wirabhumi (then she bore the title 2nd Princess of Lasem), also known as Bhre Lasem Sang Alemu "The Fat Princess of Lasem".

After Hayam Wuruk died in 1389, and the empire fell into chaos and decline during the contest over succession between Wikramawardhana and Wirabhumi. The dispute ended in Wirabhumi's defeat in the Regreg war. Wikramawardhana succeeded Hayam Wuruk as the King of Majapahit.

== Legacy ==
His reign, as part of Indosphere culturally, helped further Indianisation of Javanese culture through the spread of Hinduism and Sanskritization.

== In popular culture ==
In games

- Hayam Wuruk appeared as a playable commander in the mobile game Rise of Kingdoms.
- Hayam Wuruk is featured as a key historical figure in the strategy board game Buru by Crafty Games, where players act as nobles sent by the king and Gajah Mada to explore and build influence on the Buru island during the Majapahit era.

== See also ==
- Gosari inscription
- Jabung
- Penataran
- Hinduism in Indonesia
- Hinduism in Java
- Agama Hindu Dharma
- Kejawèn
- Nagarakretagama
- List of Hindu temples in Indonesia
- Jalan Gajah Mada and Jalan Hayam Wuruk

| Preceded by Tribhuwana Wijayatunggadewi | Monarch of Majapahit Empire; 1350–1389 | Succeeded by Wikramawardhana |
