= Kertanagara =

Last ruler of Singhasari

- Sri Maharajadiraja
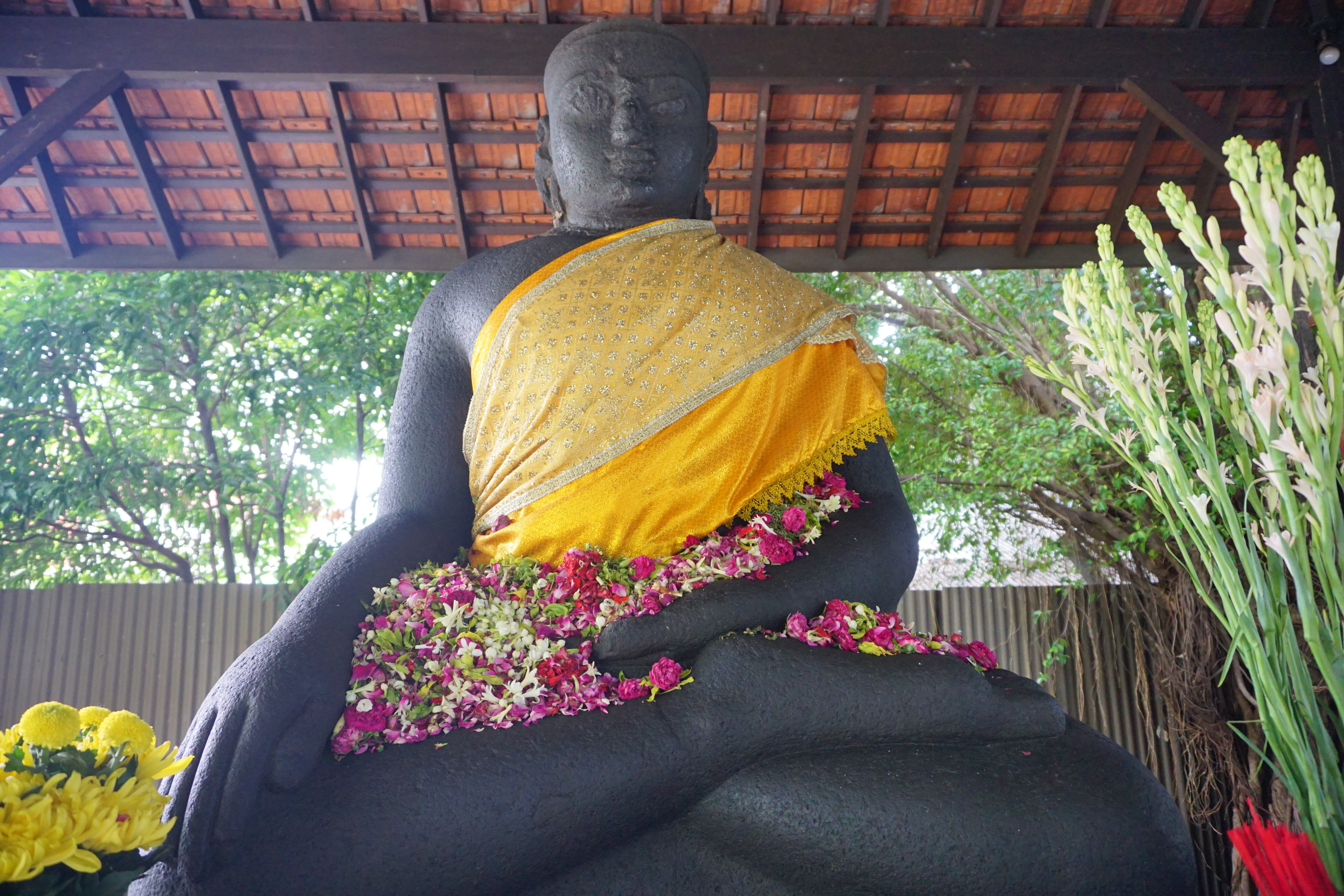
- Joko Dolog statue Surabaya from Jawi Temple the embodiment of Kertanagara as Buddha Mahaksobhya.

King of Singhasari
- Reign: 1268 – 1292
- Predecessor: Wisnuwardhana
- Died: 1292
- Burial: Singhasari and Jawi Temple, Kingdom of Singhasari
- Spouse: Bajradewi
- Issue: Tribhuwaneswari; Gayatri
Regnal name
- Śrī Mahārājādhirāja Kṛtanagara Wikrama Dharmmottunggadewa
Posthumous name
- Bhatara Siwa Buddha
- House: Rajasa
- Father: Wisnuwardhana
- Mother: Jayawardhani
- Religion: Shaivism; Tantrayana

Sri Maharajadiraja Sri Kertanagara Wikrama Dharmatunggadewa, Kritanagara, or Sivabuddha (died 1292), alias Nararya Murdhaja, was the last and most important ruler of the Singhasari kingdom of Java, reigning from 1268 to 1292. Under his rule Javanese trade and power developed considerably, reaching the far corners of the Indonesian archipelago.

== Background ==
Kertanagara was the fifth ruler of Singasari and was the son of the previous king, Wisnuwardhana (r. 1248–1268). He effectively held power from 1254 and officially succeeded his father when the latter died in 1268. The Singasari dynasty had come to power in Java following the overthrow of the previous Kediri Kingdom by Ken Arok, the first Singhasari ruler in 1222.

Kertanagara was a follower of a mystical Tantric syncretism of Hinduism and Buddhism, and presented himself as the divine god-king incarnation of Shiva and Buddha. Kertanagara celebrated many religious festivals and commissioned sculptures and metal plaques during his reign.

== Conquests ==
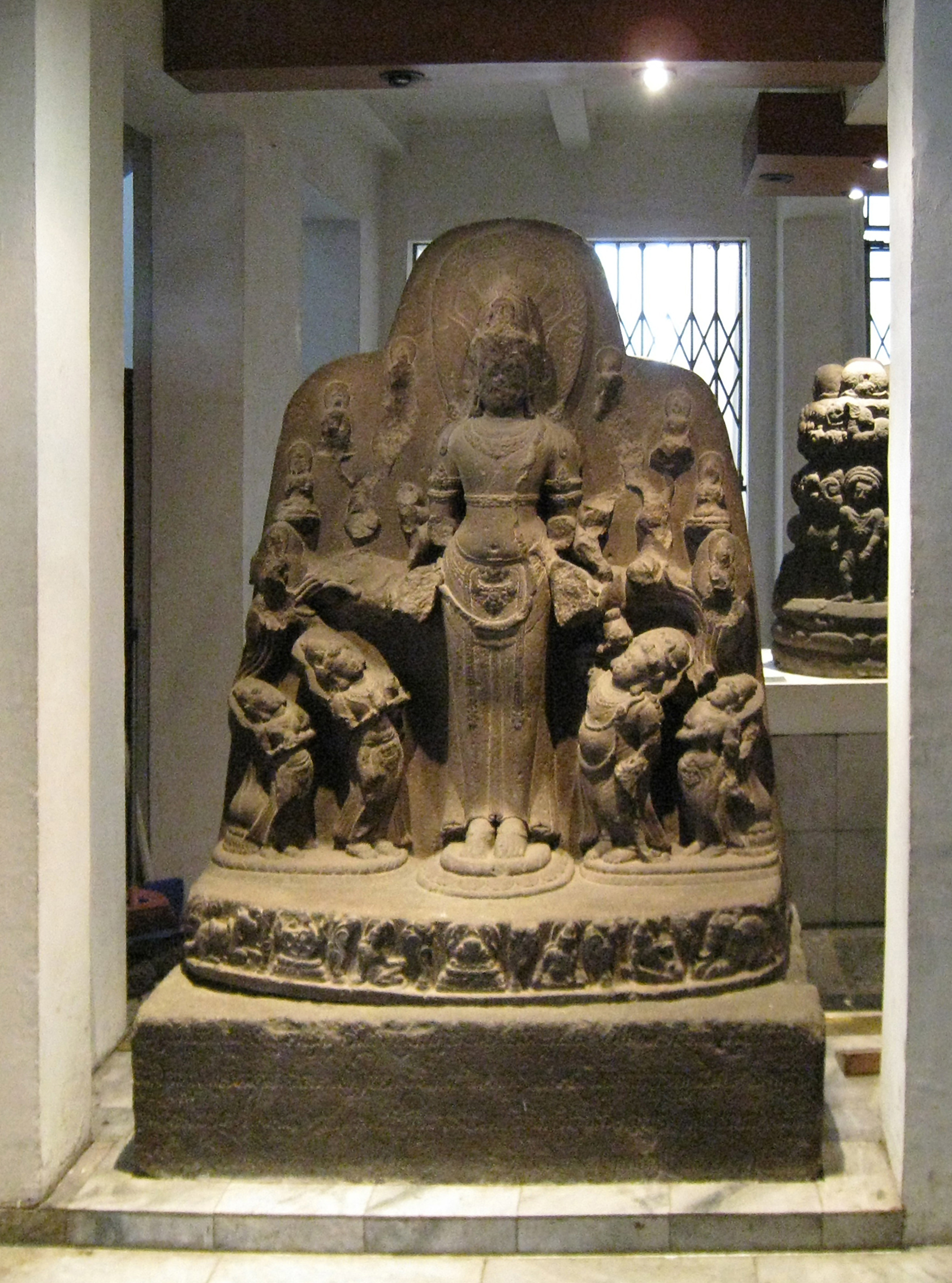
The statue of Amoghapasa presented by Kertanagara of Singhasari to the Melayu Kingdom of East Sumatra

Singhasari reached the height of its power during Kertanagara's rule, which saw the dramatic expansion of Javanese power into Sumatra, the Malay Peninsula, and Bali. He extended Javanese involvement in the lucrative spice trade with the Maluku Islands. He also put down rebellions in Java by Cayaraja (Bhayaraja) in 1270 and Mahisha Rangkah in 1280.

Kertanagara was the first Javanese ruler with territorial ambitions that extended beyond the island of Java. In 1284, he subjected nearby Bali to vassalage. Kertanagara managed to form an alliance with Champa, another dominant state in Southeast Asia.

Late in his reign, the Pamalayu expedition succeeded in gaining control of the Melayu Kingdom in eastern Sumatra, and possibly also gained control over the Sunda Kingdom and hegemony over the Strait of Malacca. Other areas in Madura Island and Borneo also offered their submission to Kertanagara.

== Conflict with the Mongols ==
Following the conquest of Song China, the Mongol Yuan dynasty sought to extend its power in Southeast Asia. In 1289 Kublai Khan, the grandson of Genghis Khan, sent his ambassadors to Java, demanding tribute and submission to the Yuan dynasty. Kertanagara took grave offense to the request and arrested the envoys. He branded their faces, cut their ears and sent them back to China with disfigured faces.

Knowing that the Mongols would send a military expedition to punish him, Kertanagara tried to solidify his power. Around 1290, he launched the Pamalayu expedition to Sumatra, to conquer Jambi in the south, one of the successor states to Srivijaya. Jambi was one of the first Indonesian polities where Islam had established its presence, and it already entertained cordial relationships with Yuan China.

Kublai Khan ordered that a strong punitive naval expedition be launched against the remote equatorial islands to punish Kertanagara in 1292.

== Rebellion of Jayakatwang ==
In the meantime, Kertanagara had dominated all of Java, but before the Mongol fleet arrived, a dramatic political change occurred. Jayakatwang, prince of Kediri and one of Singhasari's most powerful vassals rebelled against his overlord. With the bulk of the Javanese army in campaign overseas and Singasari's defense weakened, Jayakatwang seized his chance and launched a coup against Kertanagara. He launched a diversionary attack to northern East Java, where his troops drew the remaining Singhasari troops left on the island away from the capital. With Kutaraja, the Singhasari capital defenseless, Jayakatwang attacked the capital city unnoticed from the mountainous southern region.

Kertanagara was killed along with many courtiers in his palace in Singhasari in May or June 1292. Jayakatwang then declared himself ruler of Java and king of the restored Kediri Kingdom.

Among the few surviving relatives of Kertanagara was his son-in-law, Raden Wijaya, who fled to Madura Island, where he was sheltered by its regent, Arya Viraraja. Vijaya then established himself in the lower Brantas delta, where he built a settlement that would grow into the mighty empire of Majapahit.

== Legacy ==
Raden Wijaya used the oncoming Mongol troops to overthrow Jayakatwang. Wijaya then betrayed his Mongol allies, who were exhausted after the war, drove them from Java and established Majapahit as one of the greatest empires to arise from within the area covered by the modern territory of Indonesia.

Kertanagara had no male heir, but through his daughter Gayatri Rajapatni, who married Raden Wijaya, Kertanagara became the ancestor of Rajasa dynasty, the ruling dynasty of Majapahit. His daughter Gayatri and his granddaughter Tribhuwana Wijayatunggadewi would become queen regnant of Majapahit. His great-grandson Hayam Wuruk became the greatest king of Majapahit, which under his rule became one of the greatest empires in Nusantara.

Kertanagara was later eulogized as Mahaksobya Dyani Buddha by his descendants in the Wurare Inscription.

In 1273 Saka or corresponds to the year 1351 CE, Gajah Mada the Mahapatih of Majapahit issued an inscription to commemorate the construction of a funerary caitya or burial temple dedicated to King Kertanagara that died in 1214 Saka (1292 CE). The temple mentioned in this inscription most possibly refer to the syncretic Shivaist-Buddhist Singhasari temple, since this inscription was discovered near this temple. It seems that Gajah Mada specifically held the late king Kertanagara in high esteem and pay special tribute even 58 years after his death, which led for historian to suggests a possible link between them. Nevertheless, both men are known for their aspiration to unify the Nusantara archipelago.

The concept of Nusantara as a unified region was not invented by Gajah Mada in 1336, but was first coined by Kertanagara in Mula Malurung inscription dated 1255. Furthermore, in 1275, the term Cakravala Mandala Dvipantara was used by him to describe the aspiration of united Southeast Asian archipelago under Singhasari and marked the beginning of his efforts to achieve it. Dvipantara is a Sanskrit word for the "islands in between", making it a synonym to Nusantara as both dvipa and nusa mean "island". Kertanagara envisioned the union of Southeast Asian maritime kingdoms and polities under Singhasari as a bulwark against the rise of the expansionist Mongol-led Yuan dynasty of China. It is very possible that Gajah Mada has made Kertanagara a role model and took his idea as a political inspiration to unify the archipelago.

== See also ==
- History of Indonesia
- Pararaton
- Nagarakretagama

Preceded by Visnuvardhana	Ruler of Java; 1268–1292	Succeeded by Jayakatwang
