= Gosari inscription =

Gosari inscription or Butulan inscription is an inscription dated 1298 saka (1376 CE) located in the Butulan cave, limestone mountain region in Gosari village, Ujungpangkah, Gresik, East Java. Unlike other ancient inscription that usually carved on a large monolith stone, this inscriptions was carved on the cave wall.

The villagers from surrounding area were already aware of the existence of the inscription for quite a long time, however it was formally reported to local authority in 2004. Since 2005 further study was conducted and concluded that the inscription was connected to the Majapahit kingdom and written during the reign of king Hayam Wuruk. Also concluded that the inscription was written about a ksatrya (knight) named Sang Rama Samadya who inhabited the cave because he was being exiled. Historian suggested that Sang Rama Samadya probably was once an important ksatrya (knight), a palace courtier or an official in the Majapahit court that was defeated in court politics and lost the favour of the king. As the result he must endure exile in this cave, and performed semadi (meditation) probably to pursue spiritual or martial art mastery.

== Content ==
Gosari inscription has been translated by Luthfi from Gadjah Mada University with archaeology team from Ministry of Culture and Tourism in 2005.

1. diwasani ngambal 1298
2. duk winahon denira san(g) rama samadya
3. makadi siri buyutarjah tali kur si
4. raka durahana

== Translation ==
1. In the year 1298 (saka, 1376 CE) in Ambal
2. at that time was inhabit by San(g) Rama Samadya
3. buyut arjah talikur
4. the exiled one
