= Rajasa dynasty =

13th–15th-century dynasty in Java

The Rajasa dynasty (Javanese: ꦫꦴꦗꦱ, IAST: Rājasa) was the ruling dynasty of Singhasari and later Majapahit during the 13th to 15th centuries in eastern Java. The rulers of the Rajasa dynasty trace their origins back to Śrī Ranggah Rājasa, who founded the dynasty in the early 13th century. According to Pararaton, Ranggah Rājasa was born in the town of Tumapel (present day Malang, East Java). He was considered as the founder of both the Singhasari and Majapahit line of monarchs.

In Sanskrit and Old Javanese, the term rājasa means either "passion" or "dust"/"soil".

== List of rulers ==
Genealogy diagram of Rajasa dynasty, the royal family of Singhasari and Majapahit. Rulers are highlighted with period of reign.

Singhasari period:

1. Ken Arok (1222—1227)
2. Anusapati (1227—1248)
3. Panji Tohjaya (1248)
4. Vishnuwardhana-Narasimhamurti (1248—1268)
5. Kertanegara (1268—1292)

Majapahit period:

1. Raden Wijaya (1294—1309)
2. Jayanegara (1309—1328)
3. Queen regnant Tribhuwana Wijayatunggadewi (1328—1350)
4. Hayam Wuruk (1350—1389)
5. Vikramavardhana (1389—1429)
6. Queen regnant Suhita (1429—1447)
7. Kertawijaya (1447–1451)
8. Rajasawardhana (1451–1453), followed by three years of interregnum
9. Girishawardhana (1456–1466)
10. Suraprabhawa (1466–1474)
11. Girindrawardhana (1474–1498)

== Family Tree ==
Family Tree of the Rajasa Dynasty

Singhasari (1222-1292)

Majapahit (1293-1498)

♀ Ken Umang	Sri Ranggah; Rajasa^{(1)} (Ken Angrok) r. 1222-1227/47	♀ Ken Dedes	Tunggul; Ametung
Panji; Tohjaya^{(3)} r. 1248	Mahisa Wong; Teleng	Bhatara; Anusapati^{(2)} r. 1227/47-1248
Bhatara; Narasinghamurti	Jayawisnu wardhana^{(4)} r. 1248-1268
Dyah Lembu; Tal	Kertanagara^{(5)} r. 1268-1292
♀ Indreswari	Kertarajasa; Jayawardhana^{(1)} (Raden Wijaya) r. 1293-1309	♀ Gayatri; Rajapatni
Sri; Sundarapandya; Dewa Adhiswara^{(2)} r. 1309-1328	♀ Sri Tribhuwana; Wijayatungga dewi^{(3)} r. 1328-1351	Cakradhara
Sri; Rajasanagara^{(4)} (Hayam Vuruk) r. 1351-1389	Singhawardhana	♀ Dyah Nertaja
♀ Kusumawardhani	Wikrama wardhana^{(5)} r. 1389-1429	♀ Bhre Daha
Wijaya; Parakrama wardhana^{(7)} r. 1447-1451	Bhre Hyang; Parameswara; Ratnapangkaja	♀ Sri Suhita^{(6)} r. 1429-1447
Rajasawardhana; Sang Sinagara^{(8)} r. 1451-1453	Girishawardhana^{(9)} r. 1456-1466	Sri Adi; Suraprabhawa^{(10)} r. 1466-1468
Girindrawardhana; Dyah; Ranawijaya^{(11)} fl. 1478

== See also ==
- List of monarchs of Java
- Greater India
- Indosphere
- Hinduism in Indonesia
