= Raden Wijaya =

13th-century Javanese emperor, the founder and the first monarch of Majapahit empire

- Nararya Sanggramawijaya Sri Maharaja Kertarajasa Jayawardhana
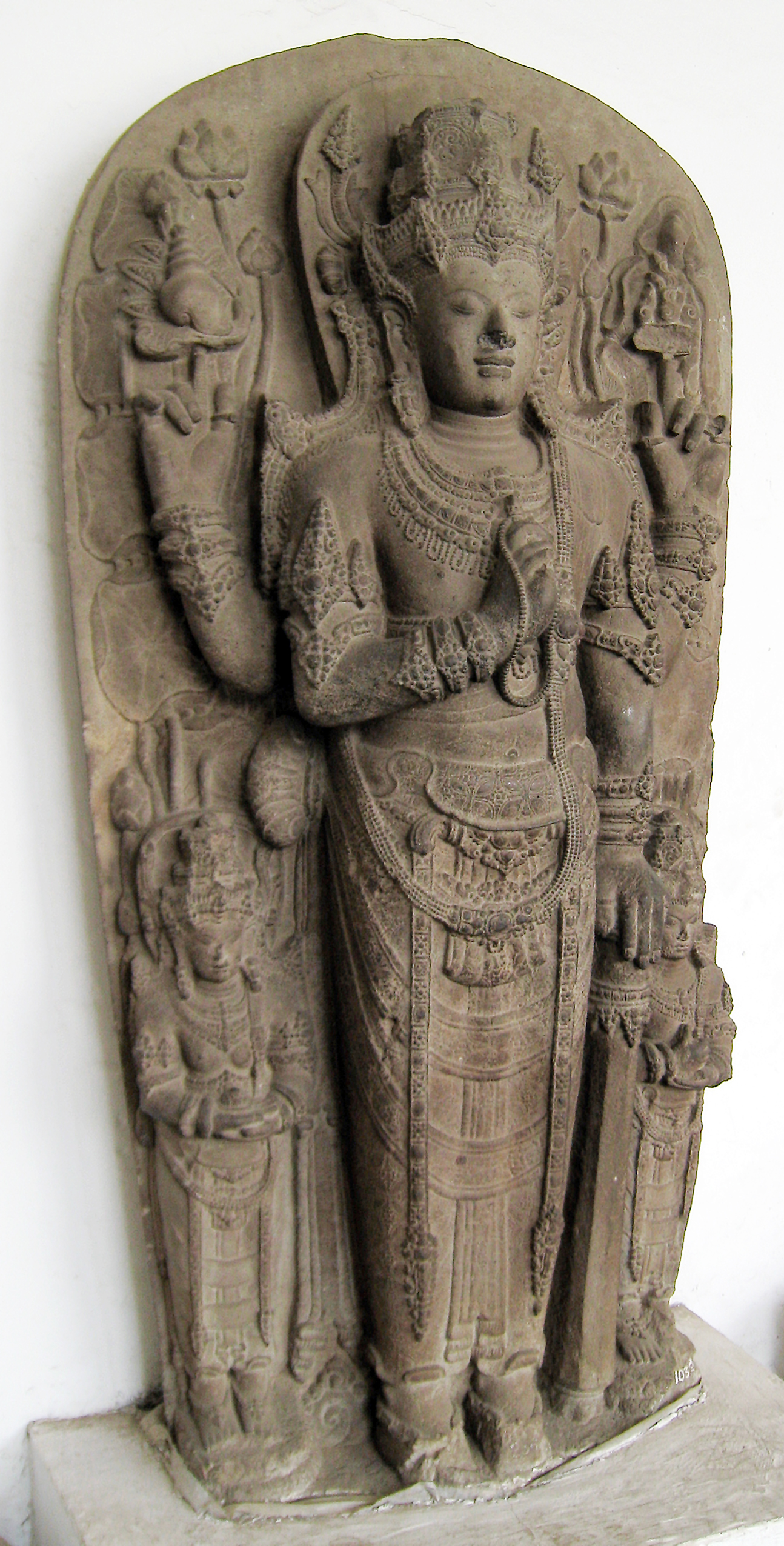
- Statue of Harihara, a combination of the gods Shiva and Vishnu, which is the deified portrayal of Raden Wijaya. Originally located in Simping Temple, Blitar. From the collection of National Museum of Indonesia, Jakarta.

1st Maharaja of Majapahit
- Reign: 1293–1309
- Successor: Jayanegara
- Died: 1309; Kingdom of Majapahit
- Burial: Simping Temple, Blitar Regency
- Principal Consorts: Rajapatni Gayatri; Tribhuwaneswari
- Wives: Narendraduhita; Prajnaparamita; Indreswari
- Issue: Tribhuwannottunggadewi, 3rd Queen of Majapahit; Jayanagara, 2nd King of Majapahit; Rajadewi Maharajasa, 2nd Princess of Daha
Names
- Raden Wijaya or Nararya Sangramawijaya or Dyah Wijaya
Regnal name
- Kertarajasa Jayawardhana ꦑꦼꦂꦡꦬꦗꦯꦗꦪꦮꦂꦝꦟ
- Dynasty: Rajasa dynasty
- Father: Dyah Lembu Tal
- Religion: Hinduism

Raden Wijaya (Rāden Wijaya, also spelt Vijaya) alias Nararya Sangramawijaya (Regnal name Kertarajasa Jayawardhana) was a Javanese prince and the founder of the Majapahit Empire, which ruled Java and much of the Nusantara spanning both Asia and Oceania until the 16th century. His rule was marked by the victory against the army and the Mongol navy of Kublai Khan's Yuan dynasty.

His reign lasted from 1292 to his death in 1309. The history of his founding of Majapahit was written in several records, including Pararaton and Negarakertagama.

== Ancestry ==
There are several versions of his ancestry. According to Pararaton, Raden Wijaya was the son of Mahisa Campaka (Nara Singhamurti), prince of Singhasari. Mahisa Campaka alias Narasingamurti is the son of Mahisa Wonga Teleng. Meanwhile, Mahisa Wonga Teleng was the son of Ken Arok, founder of the Rajasa dynasty.

According to later controversial source from 17th century, Pustaka Rajyarajya i Bhumi Nusantara, Raden Wijaya was the son of Rakeyan Jayadarma (son of Sunda-Galuh King Prabu Guru Darmasiksa) and Dyah Lembu Tal (daughter of Mahisa Campaka from Singhasari). Rakeyan Jayadarma was poisoned and after her husband's death, Dyah Lembu Tal returned from Sunda-Galuh Kingdom to Singhasari with Raden Wijaya. This story is similar to that of Babad Tanah Jawi which mentioned the founder of Majapahit was Jaka Sesuruh, a son from the king of Pajajaran's which is located in Sunda Kingdom. Jaka Sesuruh ran to the east because of a rivalry with his step brother Siyung Wanara.

Alternatively with Nagarakretagama, Dyah Lembu Tal, also known as Dyah Singhamurti, was a man and the great-grandson of Ken Arok, 1st King of Singhasari (1222–1227) and Ken Dedes, by their son Mahisa Wonga Teleng, and his son Mahisa Campaka. Because Nagarakretagama was written in 1365, 56 years since the Raden Wijaya's death, popular opinion supports it.

== Conflict with Kediri and Mongols ==
In 1289, Kublai Khan sent a demand for tribute to the Kingdom of Singhasari, although the demand was refused by Kertanagara, King of Singhasari and the messenger was humiliated with his ear cut off. Shortly after, there was a rebellion against Singhasari in the duchy of Gelang-Gelang (modern day Madiun) led by Jayakatwang. Kertanagara was killed in the attempt to put down the rebellion in 1292, and Raden Wijaya fled to Sumenep, Madura, along with the governor of that region, Arya Wiraraja. There, Raden Wijaya made a plan to establish a new kingdom. Wijaya promised that he would divide Java with Arya Wiraraja if Arya Wiraraja could help him overthrow Jayakatwang's Kediri kingdom . When he was young, Wiraraja served Narasingamurti, Raden Wijaya's grandfather. So, he was willing to help the prince to overthrow Jayakatwang. Raden Wijaya vowed that if he succeeded in reclaiming his father in law's throne, his power would be divided into two, namely for himself and for Wiraraja. In 1293 the Mongol army came to punish Kertanagara who dared to harm Kublai Khan's envoy in 1289. Raden Wijaya as Kertanagara's heir was ready to hand over himself as long as he is first helped to liberate himself from Jayakatwang. So the Mongol and Majapahit troops joined forces to invade the capital city of Kadiri. At that time, the Kingdom of Kediri collapsed. Next, Raden Wijaya based on Wiraraja's input attacked the Mongol army who were experiencing the euphoria of victory against the Kediri Kingdom. Inevitably, Wiraraja with his various tactics brought victory to Raden Wijaya to defeat the Mongol army. This was the starting point for Raden Wijaya to come to power and make Tarik (Trowulan, Mojokerto) the center of power which later became the Majapahit Kingdom. The term Majapahit emerged because in the Tarik forest area there are many maja (mojo) fruits which taste bitter. Raden Wijaya became the first king of Majapahit which became independent in 1293. Arya Wiraraja was appointed as the pasangguhan/ senapati (warlord) of Majapahit with the title Rakryan Mantri Arya Wiraraja Makapramuka.

Arya Wiraraja's son Ranggalawe served as one of Wijaya's adipati/ duke but in later days he would rebel against the new king. Other famous officers were Lembu Sora and Nambi, but both also rebelled against Wijaya after the founding of the Majapahit kingdom. The trigger for the rebellion appears to have been dissatisfaction with positions granted to key nobles. The Ranggalawe rebellion was the first, recorded in 1295. Ranggalawe lost in his battle against the Majapahit Kingdom and died at the hands of Mahisa Anabrang while fighting at the Tambak Beras river. The Lembu Sora rebellion occurred in 1301. Lembu Sora and his followers Juru Demung and Gajah Biru died in this conflict. The Nambi rebellion occurred during the reign of King Jayanegara, and was suppressed in 1316.

== Reign (1293–1309) ==
=== Founding of Majapahit ===
In November 1292, a Mongol force landed in Tuban, East Java, with the aim of revenge for Kertanagara's humiliation of the Mongol messenger. However, Kertanegara was already dead. Raden Wijaya initially made an alliance with the Mongols with the aim of attacking Kediri, which had become the strongest country in Java. Jayakatwang was defeated and destroyed in 1293, at which point Raden Wijaya turned and attacked the Mongol force. The Mongols, already weakened by tropical diseases, the climate, and imperial overreach, were forced to flee Java. Raden Vijaya then established the Majapahit kingdom, taking the title Kritarajasa Jayavardhana.

=== Political and administrative policies ===
Raden Wijaya was known as a firm and capable ruler. Aria Wiraraja who had been so useful during the period of the establishment of the kingdom, was given Madura, which was granted a special status. He was also given an autonomous region around Lumajang and the Blambangan Peninsula, and his son, Nambi, was appointed prime minister. Raden Wijaya also formed a special army guard for the king which consists of 7 people named Ra Kuti, Ra Semi, Ra Tanca, Ra Wedeng, Ra Yuyu, Ra Banyak, and Ra Pangsa.

=== Heir ===
From his wife Indreswari, Raden Wijaya had a son, Dyah Jayanegara. From his wife Gayatri Rajapatni, he had two daughters, Tribhuwana Wijayatunggadewi and Rajadewi. Other wives seemed to be childless, including his first wife, Tribhuwana.

After his death, Raden Wijaya was succeeded by his son, Jayanegara.

== Personal life ==
According to George Coedes, prior to the fall of Singhasari, Wijaya was married to Gayatri Rajapatni, the daughter of Kertanegara, King of Singhasari. However, during the formation of the new kingdom Majapahit, he married the four daughters of Kertanegara.

The siblings were Parameswari Tribhuwana the oldest, Prajnaparamitha, Narendra Duhita, and Gayatri Rajapatni the youngest. The reasons of Raden Wijaya's practice of siblings polygamy was to ensure his claim of legitimacy, also to prevent the contest for Kertanegara's Singhasari legacy. Raden Wijaya also took Indreswari (also known as Dara Petak), supposedly a princess of Malayu Dharmasraya Kingdom brought by Kebo Anabrang to Majapahit court from Sumatra through Kertanegara's Pamalayu expedition. Pararaton mentioned that Kala Gemet was born by Dara Petak, the Dharmasraya princess, while Nagarakretagama mentioned that he was born by Indreswari, leading to assumption that Indreswari was another name of Dara Petak. King Kertarajasa Jayawardhana has five wives, however in his posthumous portrayal as the god Harihara in Simping temple, his image was flanked by two female figures, suggested that he has two pramesvari (queen consort), one is Gayatri, the other is Tribhuwana or probably Dara Petak.

=== Spouses and Children ===
Supreme Queen

1. Rajapatni Sri Rajendra Dyah Dewī Gayatri
  the youngest daughter of King Kertanegara of Singhasari

Queen

1. Sri Parameswari Dyah Dewī Tribhuwaneswari
  the eldest daughter of King Kertanegara of Singhasari

Consorts

1. Sri Mahadewī Dyah Dewī Narendraduhita
  daughter of King Kertanegara of Singhasari
2. Sri Jayendra Dyah Dewī Prajña Paramita
  daughter of King Kertanegara of Singhasari
3. Sri Indreswari
  born as Dara Petak, daughter of King Srimat Tribhuwanaraja Mauliawarmadewa of Dharmasraya

Children

1. Tribhuwana, 3rd Queen of Majapahit
  born as Dyah Tya, daughter of Gayatri
2. Jayanagara, 2nd King of Majapahit
  son of Dara Petak
3. Rajadewi Maharajasa, 2nd Princess of Daha
  born as Dyah Wiyat, daughter of Gayatri

== Death ==
According to the Nagarakretagama, King Wijaya died in 1309. He was buried in the Simping Temple as "Harihara", the combination of Vishnu and Shiva.

He was succeeded by his son Jayanegara.

== See also ==
- Senapati of Mataram, the founder and first king of Mataram Sultanate was a descendant of Raden Wijaya

| Preceded by — | Monarch of Majapahit Empire; 1294–1309 | Succeeded by Jayanegara |
