= Nagarakretagama =

Old Javanese eulogy

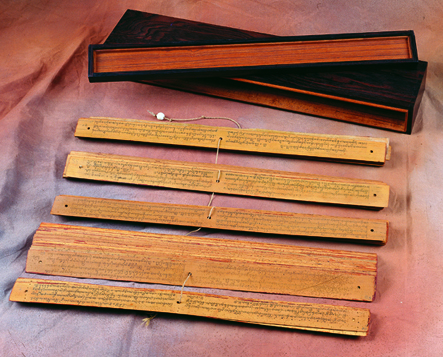
Nagarakretagama palm-leaf manuscript

The Nagarakretagama (Sanskrit: नगरकृतागम, romanized: Nagarakṛtāgama, lit. 'perfect doctrine of the state'), originally known as Desawarnana (Sanskrit: देशवर्णन, romanized: Deśavarṇana, lit. 'description of districts'), is an Old Javanese historical chronicle and eulogy to Hayam Wuruk, a Javanese king of the Majapahit Empire. It is kakawin poem written by a Buddhist cleric with the pen-name Prapañca in 1365 CE (1287 of the Shaka era). It was subsequently transmitted in the form of palm leaf manuscripts that have been found in Bali and Lombok. The Nagarakretagama contains detailed descriptions of the Javanese countryside and mentions many regions outside Java that the Majapahit king claimed authority over. The poem affirms the importance of Hinduism and Buddhism in Majapahit society describing temples and ceremonial observances.

== Title ==
The title originally given to this work by its author Prapañca is Deśavarṇana ("Description of districts"). This title appears near the end of the poem, where the poet writes:

In Śaka 'mountains-elephants-suns' (1287, AD 1365), in the month of Aśwayuja, at the auspicious moment of the full moon,

Then the Poet closes his description of the King’s qualities as all-conqueror in the realm.

Because of the number of districts set out in order and its aim of recording them in a book, let it be called the 'Depiction of the Districts' (maṅarana Deśavarṇana)

May it be a means of raising the King’s good opinion, should he recall him who has long humbled himself for poesy.

— Stuart Robson (trans.), Deśavarṇana, canto 94, stanza 2

The alternative title Nagarakṛtāgama does not appear in the poem itself, but only in a colophon belonging to one of the manuscript lineages. This colophon begins with the statement iti Nagarakṛtāgama samāpta ("Thus concludes the Complete Doctrine of the State"), and goes on to state that the manuscript was copied in East Bali in 1740 CE (1662 Śaka) by a scribe called Artha Pamasah. Not all manuscripts contain this colophon with the Nagarakṛtāgama title; for example, the manuscript owned by Gria Pidada in Amlapura instead assigns the title Wawacan Jawa ("Story of Java") to the text.

Deśavarṇana is therefore the authentic title of the text given by its 14th-century author, whereas Nagarakṛtāgama and Wawacan Jawa were given by later Balinese scribes. However, Brandes chose to publish the first edition (1902) of the text under the title Nagarakṛtāgama, and this convention has remained prevalent in scholarship and public awareness ever since.

== The manuscript ==
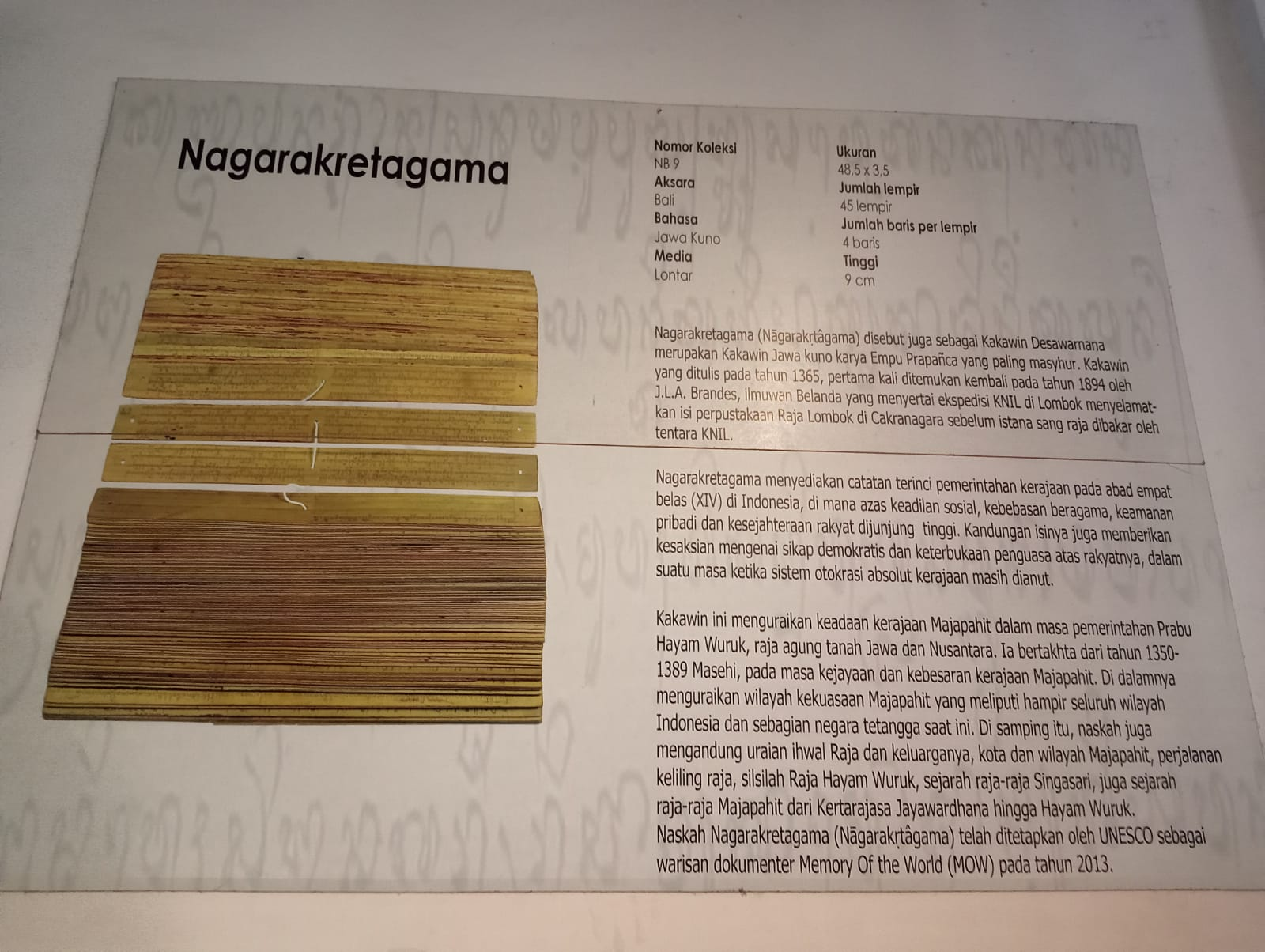
Nagarakretagama, Perpustakaan Nasional Republik Indonesia collections on Jl. Medan Merdeka Selatan, Jakarta

In 1894, the Dutch East Indies launched a military expedition against the Cakranegara royal house of Lombok. That year, the Dutch took the manuscript as part of the valuable "Lombok treasure", war booty from the destroyed palace of Mataram-Cakranagara in Lombok. The first Western scholar to study the manuscript was J.L.A. Brandes, a Dutch philologist. He accompanied the KNIL expedition to Lombok in 1894 and is credited with saving the valuable manuscripts collection of the Lombok royal library from being burnt in the chaos of the battle. A generation of Dutch scholars participated in translating the poem.

Much of its historical value was due to its having been the product of priestly activities directed at enhancing the magical powers of the ruler at the time. The manuscript is written on lontar leaves. It was held in the library of Leiden University in the Netherlands, with inventory code number L Or 5.023.

After its translation in the early 20th century, the Nagarakretagama became an inspiration and foundation of the Indonesian independence movement.

In 1970, during the state visit of President Suharto to the Netherlands, the manuscript was given back to Indonesia. Today, the manuscript is held by the National Library of Indonesia, with inventory code number NB 9. In May 2008, UNESCO recognised the significance of the Nagarakretagama by naming it "The Memory of the World - Regional Register for Asia/Pacific", and finally registered it in 2013.

== Descriptions of the Majapahit realm ==
The extent of Majapahit according to some sources. But not according to Nagarakretagama, which also included western Java into the empire, as Sunda was explicitly claimed according to canto 42 of the manuscript.

Historians have examined the poem for what it reveals about political history. In canto 13 to 14, the poet Prapanca named several states within today's Indonesian borders. This suggested that those areas were within Majapahit spheres of influence. Prapanca said the states were subsumed by Majapahit or were vassal states.

In Canto 13, several lands on Sumatra are mentioned, some of which possibly correspond to contemporary areas: Jambi, Palembang, Teba (Muaro Tebo), and Dharmasraya. Also mentioned are Kandis, Kahwas, Minangkabau, Siak, Rokan, Kampar and Pane, Kampe, Haru (Aru Kingdom in coastal North Sumatra, today around Medan), and Mandailing. Tamiyang (Aceh Tamiang Regency), negara Perlak (Peureulak), and Padang Lawas are noted in the west, together with Samudra (Samudra Pasai) and Lamuri, Batan (Bintan), Lampung, and Barus. Also listed are the states of Tanjungnegara (believed to be on Borneo): Kapuas Katingan, Sampit, Kota Lingga, Kota Waringin, Sambas, and Lawas.

In Canto 14 several lands on Borneo (and the Philippines) are mentioned: Kadandangan, Landa, Samadang, Tirem, Sedu (Sarawak), Barune (Brunei), Kalka, Saludung (Serudong River in Sabah), Solot (Sulu), Pasir, Barito, Sawaku, Tabalung, Tanjung Kutei and Malano.
And also in Hujung Medini (and Singapore): Pahang, Langkasuka, Saimwang, Kelantan, Trengganu, Johor, Paka, Muar, Dungun, Tumasik (where Singapore is today), Kelang (Klang Valley), Kedah, Jerai (Gunung Jerai), and Kanjapiniran.

Also in Canto 14 are territories east of Java: Badahulu and Lo Gajah (part of today's Bali). Gurun and Sukun, Taliwang, Sapi (Sape town, east end of Sumbawa island, by the Sape Strait) and Dompo, Sang Hyang Api, Bima. Sheran (Seram Island). Hutan Kadali (Buru island). Gurun island, and Lombok Merah. Together with prosperous Sasak (central, north and east Lombok) are already ruled. Bantayan with Luwu. Further east are Udamakatraya (Sangir and Talaud). Also mentioned are Makassar, Buton, Banggai, Kunir, Galiao with Selayar, Sumba, Solot, Muar. Also Wanda(n) (Banda island), Ambon or Maluku islands, Kai-islands (Ewab Ohoi-Ewur Mas-Il Larvul-Ngabal-istiadat), Wanin (Onin peninsula, today Fakfak Regency, West Papua), Sran (Sran or Kowiai, Kaimana), Timor and other islands.

== Description of Majapahit capital ==
"The wonders of the city: the red stone walls, thick and high, around the palace. The west gate called Pura Waktra, overlooking a spacious ground, belted with trench. Brahmastana tree with bodhi tree trunk, lining along the square, neatly shaped. That is where the royal guards stay, constantly patrolling and guarding the paseban. On the north side stood a beautiful gate with ornate iron door. To the east is the high stage, with stone-lined floor, white and shiny. In the north, south from the marketplace, full with elongated houses, very beautiful. On the south a road intersection: a soldier hall stood, where they held a meeting every Caitra month."

— Canto 8, stanza 1 and 2.

The manuscript describes the capital city of Majapahit. According to the account of Prapanca in the Nagarakretagama poem, the royal compound was surrounded by a thick, high wall of red brick. Nearby was the fortified guard post. The main gate into the palace was located in the north wall, and was entered through huge doors of decorated iron. Outside the north gate was a long building where courtiers met once a year, a market place, and a sacred crossroads. Just inside the north gate was a courtyard containing religious buildings. On the western side of this courtyard were pavilions surrounded by canals where people bathed. At the south end a gate led to rows of houses set on terraces in which palace servants lived. Another gate led to a third courtyard crowded with houses and a great hall for those waiting to be admitted into the ruler's presence. The king's own quarters, which lay to the east of this courtyard, had pavilions on decorated red brick bases, ornately carved wooden pillars, and a roof decorated with clay ornaments. Outside the palace were quarters for Shiva priests, Buddhists, and other members of the nobility. Further away, and separated from the palace by open fields, were more royal compounds, including that of the chief minister Gajah Mada.

== Accounts of ceremonies ==
all the multitude of the artisans there, making plaited bamboo-work, fashioning the sthana singha (lion-throne) in the wanguntur (main court-yard), setting aside those who carved wawans (carriers) for food, bukubukuran (all kinds of tower-like structures) and figures and things of that kind. Took part also the smiths of dadaps (embossed coverings) of gold and silver, all of them bestirring themselves the more in their respective customary occupations.

— Canto 63, stanza 4.

In the poem, Prapanca recounted Hayam Wuruk's religious observances in the Candi Singhasari, in which he entered the sanctuary and performed the puspa ceremony for his great-grandfather Kertanegara. After the visit, he went to Kagenengan to perform worship to the founder of the Singhasari kingdom, Rajasa.

At the waxing moon, on the twelfth night, they invited there that swah (soul), sutra (sacred texts) recital was performed and homa (fire offering) worship, on the other hand also parίshrama (amphidromy); they were (only considered) complete at the arrival of the swah (soul) again (on earth). The honoured holy puspa (flower effigy) was worked on with yoga (concentration); in the night was performed the eminent pratistha (placing) ceremony.

— Canto 64, stanza 5.

Prapanca told details of the sraddha ceremony, performed to honour the soul of a deceased. He described specifically the ceremony for the Queen Grandmother's soul, Gayatri Rajapatni, who had died twelve years earlier. In the canto 63, stanza 4, Prapanca narrated the preparation of the ceremony by the court artisans. During the ceremony, lion thrones were erected, where priests placed a flower effigy (puspa) symbolising the soul of the Queen Grandmother. The descent of the soul to earth and its final placement in the puspa were narrated in canto 64, stanza 5.

The ceremony lasted for seven days. Colorful pageants crowded the main courtyard. The whole ceremony was performed to please the Rajapatni's soul in hopes that her favour would shine on the reign of her descendants. The posthumous ceremony continued and the king ordered the repair of the Kamal Pundak sanctuary to enact a new holy shrine (candi) for the Queen Grandmother, deified as the Prajnaparamita.

== Characters and practices ==
Nagarakretagama was written as a puja sastra, a genre of Old Javanese literature of adoration and reverence, directed mainly to King Hayam Wuruk. Prapanca did not shy away to express his admiration, even bordering somewhat a cult, since he often invoked a divine quality of the king and his royal family. Nevertheless, the work seems to be independent of court's patronage since Prapanca wrote them incognito after he retired from the court.

One of the religious practices of the Majapahit royal family was the "royal walkabout". They visited cornerstones of the empire and paid homage to the ancestors of the king. The poem also describes the death of Hayam Wuruk's most trusted regent, Gajah Mada.

The Queen Grandmother Rajapatni had a special place in Prapanca's poem. In one stanza, the poem describes the Queen Grandmother as chattra ning rat wisesa (the eminent protector of the world). Rajapatni was the progenitor of the Majapahit kingdom, because she was the daughter of Kertanegara, the last king of the Singhasari kingdom, and she was also the wife of Raden Wijaya, the founder of Majapahit. Thus she was seen as the protector of the world. The Queen Grandmother is said in the poem to embody the Pramabhagavati; Bhagavati is another name of Prajnaparamita (the Goddess of Wisdom in Mahayana).

The poem portrays Kertanegara as a staunch Buddhist, described as "submissive at the Feet of the Illustrious Shakya-Lion". Upon his death, the poem describes the deification of Kertanegara in three forms: a splendid Jina, an Ardhanarishvara, (Note: Stutterheim believes that an ardhanari sculpture, now located in Berlin, is a posthumous image of Kertanegara. The image is half Shiva and half Visnu, symbolising the unity of the two gods, the unity of the kingdom, and the oneness of the dharma.) and an imposing Shiva-Buddha. (Note: Note that Shiva-Buddha is a mixture of Buddhism and Hinduism; no such image exists in India. In India, there is no deceased king in the guise of a god; it exists only in Indonesia. Hindu and Buddhist images are intertwined in many old inscriptions and candi (temples or shrines).) Particularly for the Shiva–Buddha Deity, Prapanca praises him as "the honoured Illustrious Protector of Mountains, Protector of the protectorless. He is surely, Ruler over the rulers of the world". The Shiva–Buddha Deity is neither Shiva nor Buddha, but the Lord of the Mountains, or the Supreme God of the Realm. This religious belief is indigenous to the Javanese people who combined the Deities of two religions, Hinduism and Buddhism, into the same God, the oneness of the Dharma, as is written in the Kakawin Sutasoma (see Bhinneka Tunggal Ika). When Kertanegara was deified as Shiva–Buddha, he symbolised the collective powers of the God of the Realm.

== See also ==
- Candi of Indonesia
- Indonesian Esoteric Buddhism
- Javanese culture
- Javanese historical texts
- Kakawin
- Kakawin Sutasoma
- Kejawèn
- Pararaton

== Sources ==
- Cœdès, George (1968). The Indianized states of Southeast Asia. University of Hawaii Press. ISBN 978-0824803681.
- Day, Tony; Reynolds, Craig J. (2000). "Cosmologies, Truth Regimes, and the State in Southeast Asia". Modern Asian Studies. 34 (1): 1–55. doi:10.1017/S0026749X00003589. S2CID 145722369.
- Dowling, Nancy (1992). "The Javanization of Indian Art". Indonesia. 54 (Oct). Perspectives on Bali pp. 117–138. doi:10.2307/3351167. hdl:1813/53986. JSTOR 3351167.
- Ernawati, Wahyu (2007). ter Keurs, Pieter (ed.). "Colonial collections Revisited". Mededelingen van het Rijksmuseum voor Volkenkunde. 152. 8: The Lombok Treasure (36). Leiden: CNWS [Centrum voor Niet-Westerse Studies / Centre for non-Western Studies]: 186–203. ISBN 978-9057891526.
- Guan, Kwa Chong (1998). "1. The Historical Setting". In Maull, Hanns; Segal, Gerald & Wanandi, Jusuf (eds.). Europe and the Asia-Pacific. Esrc Pacific Asia Programme. Routledge. pp. 1–10. ISBN 978-0415181778.
- Kompas, ELN (24 May 2008). ""Negarakertagama Diakui sebagai Memori Dunia" (Negarakertagama acknowledged the Memory of the World)" (in Indonesian). Jakarta: Kompas.com. Archived from the original on 29 May 2010.
- Malkiel-Jirmounsky, Myron (1939). "The Study of The Artistic Antiquities of Dutch India". Harvard Journal of Asiatic Studies. 4 (1). Harvard-Yenching Institute: 59–68. doi:10.2307/2717905. JSTOR 2717905.
- Pigeaud, Theodoor Gautier Thomas (1960a). Java in the 14th Century: A Study in Cultural History : The Nāgara-Kĕrtāgama by Rakawi Prapañca of Majapahit, 1365 A.D., Volume I: Javanese Texts in Transcription. Illustrated by Professor Th. P. Galestin (3rd revised ed.). The Hague: Martinus Nijhoff.
- Pigeaud, Theodoor Gautier Thomas (1960b). Java in the 14th Century: A Study in Cultural History : The Nāgara-Kĕrtāgama by Rakawi Prapañca of Majapahit, 1365 A.D., Volume II: Notes on the Texts and the Translations. Illustrated by Professor Th. P. Galestin (3rd revised ed.). The Hague: Martinus Nijhoff. ISBN 978-94-011-8774-9.
- Pigeaud, Theodoor Gautier Thomas (1960c). Java in the 14th Century: A Study in Cultural History : The Nāgara-Kĕrtāgama by Rakawi Prapañca of Majapahit, 1365 A.D., Volume III: Translations. Illustrated by Professor Th. P. Galestin (3rd revised ed.). The Hague: Martinus Nijhoff. ISBN 978-94-011-8772-5.
- Pigeaud, Theodoor Gautier Thomas (1962). Java in the 14th Century: A Study in Cultural History : The Nāgara-Kĕrtāgama by Rakawi Prapañca of Majapahit, 1365 A.D., Volume IV: Commentaries and Recapitulations. Illustrated by Professor Th. P. Galestin (3rd revised ed.). The Hague: Martinus Nijhoff. ISBN 978-94-017-7133-7.
- Pigeaud, Theodoor Gautier Thomas (1963). Java in the 14th Century: A Study in Cultural History : The Nāgara-Kĕrtāgama by Rakawi Prapañca of Majapahit, 1365 A.D., Volume V: Glossary, General Index. Illustrated by Professor Th. P. Galestin (3rd revised ed.). The Hague: Martinus Nijhoff. ISBN 978-94-011-8778-7.
- Riana, I Ketut (2009). Kakawin dēśa warṇnana, uthawi, Nāgara kṛtāgama: masa keemasan Majapahit (in Indonesian). Penerbit Buku Kompas. pp. 96–102. ISBN 978-9797094331.
- Sastrawan, Wayan Jarrah (2026). The Precarious Past in Premodern Java. Oakland: University of California Press. doi:10.1525/luminos.272. ISBN 978-0-520-42278-0.
- Soedjatmoko, ed. (1965). Problems of Indonesian Historiography. Cornell UP. ISBN 978-0801404030.
- Supomo, S., ed. (1977). Arjunawiwaha: A Kakawin of Mpu Tantular. Bibliotheca Indonesica. Vol. 1. The Hague: Nijhoff. p. 80. doi:10.1007/978-94-017-4963-3. ISBN 978-90-247-1936-5.
- Stutterheim, Willem F. (1938). Konow, Sten (ed.). "Note on Saktism in Java". Acta Orientalia. 17. Brill: 148.
- Stutterheim, Willem F. (1952). Het Hindüisme in de Archipel. Jakarta: Wolters.
- "Nāgarakrĕtāgama or Description of the Country (1365 AD)". Memory of The World International Register. UNESCO Memory of The World Programme. 2013.
