= Tumapel =

Tumapel was the capital city of Singhasari (1222 - 1292) near the modern city of Malang. Prior to Singhasari, it was under Kediri Kingdom.
