= Kameshwara =

Çri Maharaja Rake Sirikan çri Kameçvara Sakalabhuvanatustikarana Sarvanivaryyaviryya Parakrama Digjayottunggadeva

King of Kediri
- Reign: 1182-1194
- Successor: Kertajaya
- Born: East Java
- Died: East Java
Names
- Kameçvara
- Dynasty: Isyana dynasty
- Religion: Hindu Buddhist

Kameçvara or Kameçwara also known as Kameshwara was the eighth monarch of Kediri Kingdom and ruled circa 1182–1194. His formal stylized name was Çri Maharaja Rake Sirikan çri Kameçvara Sakalabhuvanatustikarana Sarvanivaryyaviryya Parakrama Digjayottunggadeva in addition, during the reign of Sri Kameswara, a poet named Mpu Dharmaja wrote Kakawin Smaradahana, which contains the story of the birth of Ganesha, the elephant-headed god who became the symbol Lanchana (royal seal) of his reign and of the Kediri Kingdom as stated in the inscriptions.

Tradition mentioned King Kameshwara as a man of prowess and a strikingly handsome man. His name derived from Kama-ishvara, another name of Kamadeva, the Hindu god of love and desire. His queen consort Çri Kirana was also mentioned as a woman with extraordinary beauty. Kameshvara was the prince of Kediri, while Çri Kirana was the princess of Kahuripan. The royal marriage between Kameshwara and Kirana was celebrated as the reunification of Java, between Kediri (Panjalu) and Kahuripan (Janggala), marking the reunification of former Airlangga's kingdom. In 1194 Kameshwara was succeeded by King Kertajaya.

== In Smaradhana and Panji cycles ==
During his reign, Mpu Dharmaja composed an adoration epic poem Smaradhana, in which the king was adored as the incarnation of Kamajaya, the god of love, and his capital city Dahana was admired throughout the known world. Kameçvara's wife, Çri Kirana, was celebrated as the incarnation of Kamaratih, goddess of love and passion.

The story of royal couple has inspired the famous tales of love and adventure known as Panji cycle. Kameshwara was mentioned as Raden Inu (Hino) Kertapati, while his consort Sri Kirana was mentioned as Dewi Sekartaji. However, in this tales the kingdoms was curiously switched from the historical figure, Kirana was mentioned as the princess of Kediri, while Inu Kertapati was mentioned as the prince of Kahuripan (Koripan). The Panji tales spread throughout Southeast Asia as far as Siam as the tales of prince Inao or Egnao.

Preceded by Gandra	Monarch of Kediri Kingdom; 1182-1194	Succeeded by Kertajaya
