= Jayakatwang =

King of Kediri
- Reign: 1292–1293
- Born: East Java
- Died: Late May 1293; Hujung Galuh, Surabaya, East Java, Indonesia
- Spouse: Turukbali daughter of Wisnuwardhana (according to Mulamalurung Stone)
- Issue: Ardharaja (according to Kudadu Stone)
Names
- Jayakatwang
Regnal name
- Śrī Jayakatyĕng
- Dynasty: Isyana dynasty
- Father: Sastrajaya son of Jayashaba son of Kertajaya (according to Nagarakretagama)
- Religion: Hinduism

Jayakatwang (died May 1293) was the king of short-lived second Kingdom of Kediri (also known as Gelang-Gelang Kingdom) of Java, after his overthrow of Kertanegara, the last king of Singhasari. He was eventually defeated by Raden Wijaya, Kertanegara's son-in-law using the troops of the Mongol Yuan dynasty that were invading Java. Raden Wijaya would later turn against the Mongols and found Majapahit, a great empire centered around Java.

== Background ==
Since 1271, Jayakatwang was viceroy (or governor) of Kediri, a vassal state of Singhasari. Kediri was formerly the dominant kingdom in Java until overthrown in 1222 by Ken Arok, the first king of Singhasari. Jayakatwang was probably a descendant of the Kediri royal line, and thus held ambition to restore his line to power and rulership of Java.

His name is derived from Sanskrit Jaya (victory) and Javanese ketawang (rising, or appearing).

Kediri is located in a fertile rice-producing area on Brantas River banks, approximately 80 km west of Singhasari, but separated from it by the Arjuno-Welirang volcanoes and Mount Kawi.

== Rebellion against Singhasari ==
Kertanegara, the fifth ruler of Singhasari, was an ambitious man. In 1289, a Mongol emissary came to Java to demand his submission to the Great Khan of the Yuan dynasty. Kertanegara rejected them, cut their ears, and sent them back to China. Anticipating Mongolian revenge, he prepared to thwart the forthcoming invasion by conquering important ports and kingdoms in Maritime Southeast Asia. His most important expedition was the Pamalayu expedition to Sumatra in 1292, where he sent the Javanese army to conquer Sumatra from various successor states of Srivijaya.

With the bulk of the Javanese army overseas, Jayakatwang seized his chance and launched a coup against Singhasari. He launched a diversionary attack to the northern Java, where his troops drew the remaining Singhasari troops left on the island. With Singhasari defenseless he attacked the capital city.

Kertanegara was killed in his palace. Jayakatwang then declared himself ruler of Java and king of the restored Kediri.

Among the few surviving relatives of Kertanegara was Raden Wijaya, who fled to Madura where he was sheltered by its regent, Arya Wiraraja. Following Wiraraja's plea, Jayakatwang pardoned Wijaya, who in return submitted himself to Jayakatwang. Jayakatwang gave Wijaya land in the Tarik forest in Brantas delta, to build a village that was later called Majapahit, named from the sour beal trees that grow in the area.

== Mongol invasion ==
The Mongol expedition of the Yuan dynasty sent by Kublai Khan departed from Quanzhou, traveled past Champa and Karimata, and landed at the port of Tuban in early 1293. Raden Wijaya saw this as an opportunity to avenge Kertanegara's death and claim the throne of Java. So he offered his submission, allying himself with the Mongols who weren't yet aware of the recent political changes in Java.

The expedition consisted of an army of 20,000 with 1,000 ships and a year's worth of grain. The expedition consisted mostly of southern Chinese conscripts. Arriving at the port of Tuban, they began preparing their fleet to enter the rivers of Java.

=== Conquest of Kediri ===
With Wijaya as a guide, Mongol troops declared war against Jayakatwang. Wijaya and his Mongol allies defeated Jayakatwang's navy in Surabaya at the delta of the Brantas River. Following the victory they marched along the Brantas to the Kediri Kingdom in Java's interior. After heavy fighting, they besieged and conquered Kediri. Jayakatwang was captured and then executed in late May 1293.

== Legacy ==
Jayakatwang's restoration of Kediri was short-lived, but the events of his reign would play an important part in the history of Java and Indonesia, especially in the rise of Majapahit under Raden Wijaya.

Under the guise of returning to his domain in Majapahit to prepare his tribute for the Mongols, Raden Wijaya would go on to betray his Mongol allies who were exhausted after the war with Jayakatwang. He then drove them out of Java and established Majapahit, one of the greatest thalassocratic empires to arise in Southeast Asia.

Preceded by Kertanegara	Ruler of Java; 1292–1293	Succeeded by Raden Wijaya
