= Aria Wiraraja =

Regent of Sumenep

Aria Wiraraja was named by Kertanegara of Singasari duke in Sumenep in the east part of Madura Island but in 1292 joined forces with the ruler of Kediri, Jayakatwang, in his rebellion.

The battle ended with the death of Kertanegara. Jayakatwang immediately encountered opposition from Raden Wijaya, which defeated reached Madura and, unaware of his treason, asked support to Arya Wiraraja, which helped him to get the crown in 1293.

Later he declared himself independent at Lumajang. He died in 1331.

== Bibliography ==
- Cœdès, George (1968). The Indianized States of South-East Asia. University of Hawaii Press. ISBN 978-0-8248-0368-1.
