= Jayakatwang rebellion =

1290s conflict in Java

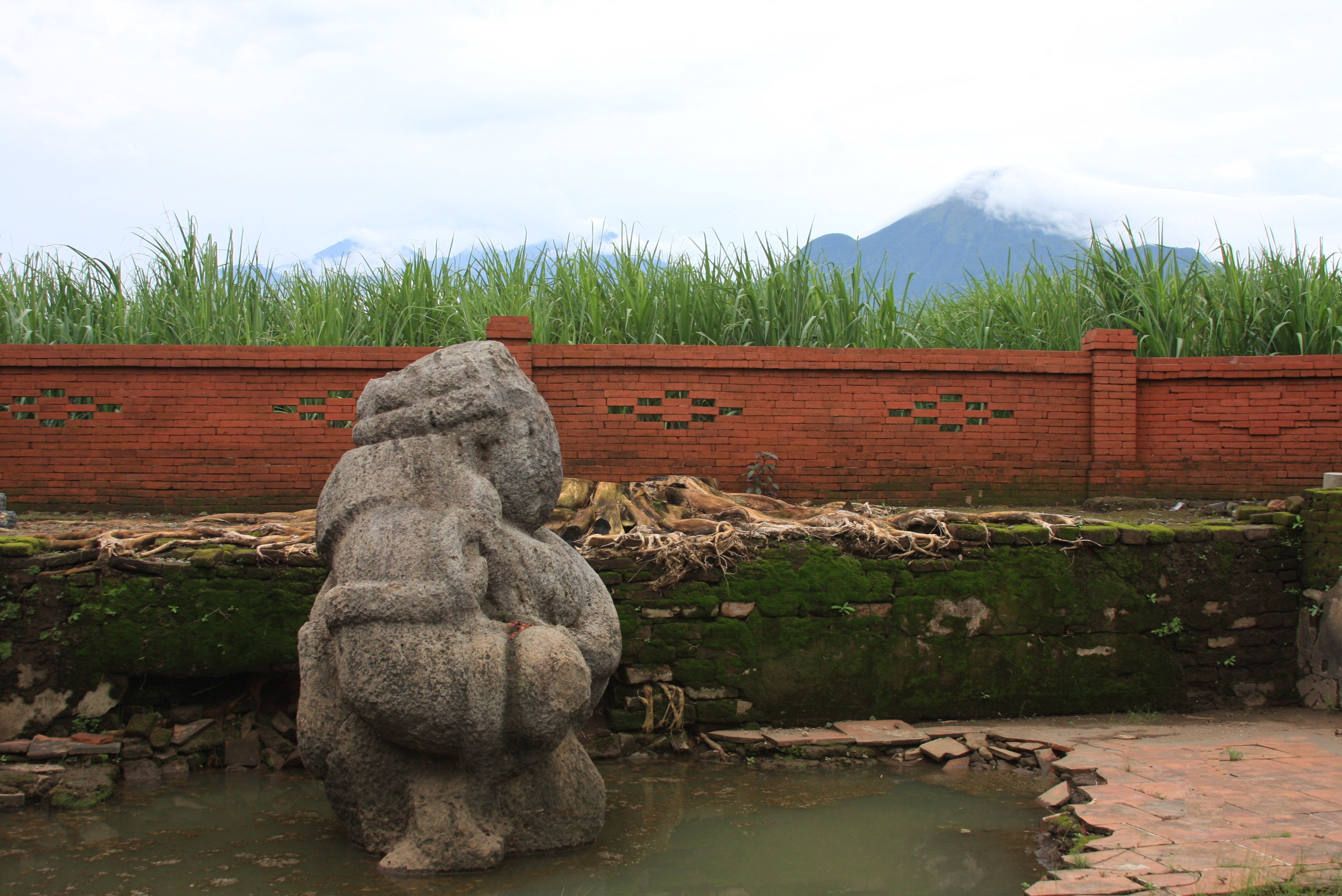
- Raos Pecinan, Carat, Pasuruan; was a place where Raden Wijaya and 600 of his remaining troops hid from Gegelang forces.
Date	April–May 1292 or between 18th May and the 15th June of 1292.
Location	Kutaraja, Singhasari, East Java
Result	Gegelang victory; Restoration of Kediri Kingdom under Jayakatwang
Territorial changes	Fall of the Singhasari, Eastern Java was taken over by Kediri Kingdom

Belligerents
Kediri; Gegelang (also known as Gelgel,Gelang-gelang, or Gelanggelang) kingdom	Singhasari

Commanders and leaders
Jayakatwang; Kebo Mundarang; Jaran Guyang; Aria Wiraraja	Kertanagara X Mpu Raganata †; Kebo Anengah †; Apanji Angragani †; Mpu Wirakreti †; Raden Wijaya; Ardharaja

Casualties and losses
Unknown	Unknown; probably heavy

Jayakatwang rebellion was a rebellion that occurred in 1292, due to Jayakatwang's ambition to become king and past grudges where his ancestor, Kertajaya, was defeated by the ancestor of Kertanagara, Ken Arok. Various Old Javanese records such as Nagarakretagama, Pararaton, Kidung Harsawijaya, and Kidung Panji Wijayakrama mention that Jayakatwang was a subordinate king in Kadiri who rebelled against Kertanagara's power in Singhasari.

== Background ==
After Singhasari defeated Malayu Dharmasraya in Sumatra in 1290, Singhasari became the most powerful kingdom in the region. Kertanegara sent a massive army to Sumatra in the Pamalayu campaign. However, seizing the opportunity of the lack of an army guarding the capital, Jayakatwang, the Duke of Kediri (Gelang-gelang), a vassal state of Singhasari, revolted against Kertanegara in 1292. Jayakatwang's revolt was assisted by Kertanegara's former close friend, Banyak Wide (also known by his title Arya Wiraraja), who secretly despised Kertanegara since he was removed from being a minister/chamberlain of Singhasari and was sent to Madura as the governor in Sumenep. Jayakatwang also had a past grudges that his ancestor, Kertajaya, was defeated by the founder of Singhasari itself, Ken Arok.

== Battle ==
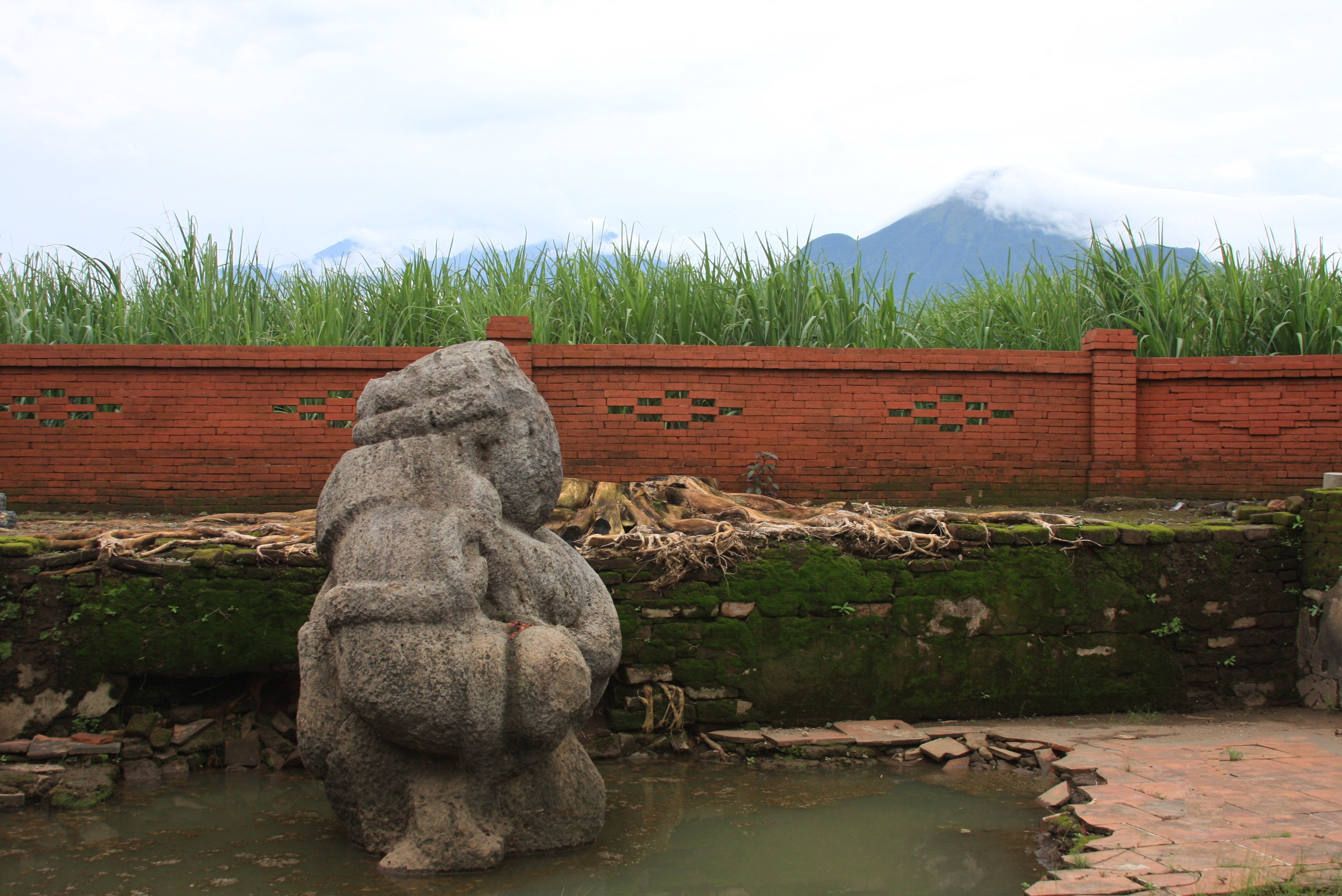
The name of the village of Carat in Pasuruan, comes from the name listed in the Kudadu inscription, namely Rabut Carat, a place where Raden Wijaya and 600 of his remaining troops fled and hid in Rabut Carat from Gegelang rebel forces after Ardharaja turncoat against him.

Jayakatwang carried out Aria Wiraraja's suggestion. The Kediri (Gelang-gelang) army attacked Singhasari simultaneously from both the north and south flanks. The king of Singhasari only noticed the invasion from the north and sent his son-in-law, Nararya Sanggramawijaya (Raden Wijaya), northward to vanquish the rebellion. The northern attack was quashed, but the southern attack under the command of Kebo Mundarang successfully remained undetected until it reached and sacked the unprepared capital city of Kutaraja.

" saking pinggir Aksa anuju in Lawor... anjugjugring Singhasari pisan "

(from the banks of Aksa (Lekso river) towards Lawor... straight to Singhasari)

Jayakatwang usurped and killed Kertanegara along with other patih and officials during the Tantra sacred ceremony while drinking palm wine, thus bringing an end to the Singhasari Kingdom. Jayakatwang then declared himself ruler of Java and king of the restored Kediri. The death of Kertanegara and the fall of Singhasari is recorded in the Gajah Mada inscription in the month of Jyesta in 1214 Saka, which has been interpreted as April–May 1292 or between 18th May and the 15th June of 1292.

According to the Kudadu inscription, Ardharaja was the son of Jayakatwang who lived in Singhasari with his wife, he joined Raden Wijaya's troops. He was in a difficult position because he had to face his own father's troops. When he learned of Singhasari's defeat, Ardharaja turned away from Raden Wijaya and chose to join the Gegelang troops.

== Aftermath ==
Having learned of the fall of the Singhasari capital of Kutaraja to the Kediri rebellion, Raden Wijaya tried to return and defend Singhasari but failed. He and his three colleagues, Rangga Lawe, Sora, and Nambi, went into exile to Madura under the protection of the regent Arya Wiraraja, who then turned to Jayakatwang's side. Kertanegara's son-in-law, Raden Wijaya, submitted to Kediri, and being brokered by Arya Wiraraja he was pardoned by Jayakatwang. Wijaya was then permitted to establish a new settlement in Tarik timberland. The new settlement was named Majapahit, which was taken from maja fruit that had a bitter taste in that timberland (maja is the fruit name and pahit means 'bitter').

In 1293, the Mongol troops from mainland China led by Shi Bi came to Java on a mission to punish Kertanegara who had dared to hurt Kublai Khan's envoy in 1289. When the Yuan army arrived in Java, Raden Wijaya sent an envoy from Madura and informed them that Kertanagara had been killed in a palace coup and the usurper, Jayakatwang, currently ruled in his place. Wijaya allied himself with the army to fight against Jayakatwang and gave the Mongols a map of the country Kalang (Gelang-gelang or Gegelang, another name for Kediri). According to the History of Yuan, Wijaya attacked Jayakatwang without success when he heard of the arrival of the Yuan navy. Then he requested their aid. In return, Yuan generals demanded his submission to their emperor, and he gave it. Raden Wijaya promised a tribute including two princesses should the army succeed in destroying Kediri. History of Yuan mentions that the war took place on 20 March, 1293. The combined Mongol and Majapahit forces attacked Daha, the capital of Kediri, since morning in 26th April. A few thousand Kediri troops tried to cross the river but drowned while 5,000 were killed in the battle. In the afternoon, Jayakatwang, his son, his wife, and all his officials surrendered and was captured.

Then the Mongol troops were counter-attacked by the Majapahit forces to be driven out of Java. According to the Pararaton and Kidung Panji Wijayakrama, Jayakatwang, who had surrendered, was then taken prisoner in the Mongol fortress in Hujung Galuh, present-day Surabaya. Jayakatwang composed Kidung Wukir Polaman during captivity, but the Mongols either killed or executed him and his son at their ship in March 1293, before they left from Java.

== See also ==
- Ken Arok rebellion
- Mongol invasion of Java
- Majapahit
