= Panji tales =

Cycle of Javanese stories

Folk tale
- Name: Panji tales
- Mythology: Javanese
- Country: Indonesia
- Region: Java
- Origin Date: before 1400

The Panji tales are a cycle of Javanese stories, centred around the legendary prince of the same name (actually a title) from East Java, Indonesia. Along with the Ramayana and Mahabharata, the tales are the basis of various poems, sculpture and painting, dance-drama performances and genres of wayang (shadow puppetry), especially the one known in East and Central Java as wayang gedhog (the meaning here is unclear, as "gedhog" means "a thumping sound"). Panji tales have been the inspiration of Indonesian traditional dances, most notably the topeng (mask) dances of Cirebon, Central Java and Malang, as well as gambuh dance-drama in Bali. Especially in the environs of Kediri, part of the probable homeland of the tales of Panji, local stories grew and were connected with the obscure legendary figure of Totok Kerot. Panji tales have spread from East Java (Indonesia) to be a fertile source for literature and drama throughout Indochina Peninsula (a region that includes modern-day Thailand, Cambodia, Laos, Myanmar, South Vietnam).

== Origin ==
The name Panji is actually a Javanese title, literally meaning 'banner' or 'flag'. In these romances, Panji is said to carry deeds traditionally ascribed to mythical ancestors, and it has also been conjectured by Dutch anthropologists that the basis of the story reflects an ancient sun and moon myth. Based on literary references and later Javanese traditions, early twentieth-century scholars conjectured that the figure of Panji may be based on Kameçvara, a twelfth-century Javanese king of Kediri, while the details of Panji's betrothed, Candra Kirana, was based on queen Çri Kirana. This theory is based on the kakawin Smaradhana, the work of the poet Mpu Dharmaja in the early 12th century. That narrative tells of the burning of the love god Kamajaya and his wife, Kamaratih, by the fire of Shiva. The spirits of Kamajaya and Kamaratih fell upon the earth and were incarnated as mortal human beings. Prince Panji and Princess Candra Kirana are considered incarnations of Kamajaya and Kamaratih. One problem with relating this theory to historical kingdoms is that the kingdoms in the tale did not correspond with the historical kingdoms. In the tale, Panji was the prince of Janggala, while the historic Kameçvara was the prince of Kediri. Likewise, in the tale, Chandra Kirana was said to be the princess of Kediri, while the actual historic Çri Kirana was the princess of Janggala. In the Surakarta court poet Rangga Warsita's genealogy Pustaka Radja Mada, the Javanese kings, including Panji, are considered the descendants of the Pandavas of the Mahabharata.

== Appearances in art and literature ==
Scenes from the Panji cycles appear in the narrative reliefs of the walls of East Javanese candi from the 13th century, the earliest of which is Candi Jawi. By the 14th century a figure wearing a cap that corresponds to the figure of Panji was featured in many reliefs on temples sponsored by the empire of Majapahit, as well as appearing as separate sculptures from temples, indicating that Panji may have been a figure of worship in Majapahit.

The legendary Javanese Saint who brought Islam to the Island, Sunan Giri, is credited, along with other innovations in wayang, with the creation of wayang gedog in 1553, to enact the Panji stories. Wayang kulit performances of the Panji cycle are in general the same as in performances of the wayang purwa (those based on the Indian epics); however, because of their material, they are considered less significant. In addition, their headdresses are simpler, and the garment worn on the lower body is based on Javanese court dress Plots based on the Panji cycle are also common in East Javanese wayang klitik (using wooden puppets), in West Javanese wayang golek (using three-dimensional rod puppets), and in wayang beber (stories depicted pictorially on scrolls). It is also the principal basis of the stories used in wayang topeng (masked dance-pantomime). In Bali, where the longest and best-known of the tales is called Malat, the story is performed in the Gambuh plays and in the operatic Arja. In Sulawesi, there is a Panji tale written in Makassar language, called Hikayat Cekele . There is also a long Malay-language story, the Hikayat Cekele Wanengpati. In Thailand, these stories are performed in the lakhon nai stage plays as "Inao" (อิเหนา).

== UNESCO Memory of the World Register ==
The Panji manuscripts of Leiden University Libraries and the national libraries of Indonesia, Malaysia and Cambodia were inscribed on 30 October 2017 in the UNESCO Memory of the World International Register affirming their global significance.

The Panji manuscripts are also digitally available through Digital Collections

== Synopsis ==
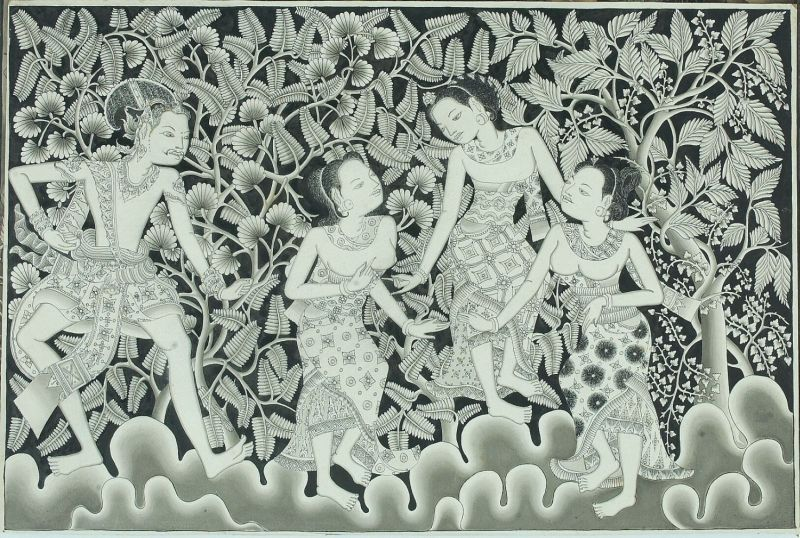
Balinese painting of Prince Panji meeting three women in the jungle

There are differing versions and episodes of the overall Panji story. In one version, The main story of Panji tells of the romance between Prince Panji and Princess Candra Kirana; and Panji's search for his long-lost bride.

== Characters and names ==
Panji and the other characters in the Panji cycle appear with various names (including nicknames) in different versions of the tale, including Raden Panji, Panji Inu Kertapati, Raden Panji Inu, Raden Inu, Inu (of) Koripan, Ino (or Hino) Kartapati, Cekel Wanengpati, and Kuda Wanengpati of Janggala, as well as Raden Panji Asmara Bangun and Panji Asmoro Bangun. The title Panji was used by historical Javanese and Balinese kings and princes, notably Gusti Ngurah Panji Sakti, who ruled North Bali in the seventeenth century. In Thailand, he is called Inao or Enau (Thai: อิเหนา) or Enau (of) Kurepan, or Raden Montree. In Myanmar (formerly Burma), he is known as Inaung or Enaung (Burmese: အီနောင်).

Panji is the prince of the Kuripan (Koripan) or Janggala. He is usually depicted in an unadorned helmet-like rounded cap. The mask for Panji has a smooth white or green face; narrow, elongated eyes; a straight and pointed nose; and delicate, half-open lips.

Panji is engaged to be married to Candra Kirana (also known as Sekartaji), the princess of Daha (Kediri), when she mysteriously disappears on the eve of the wedding. Later in the story, she is sometimes called Kuda Narawangsa when she appears disguised as a man. Panji's principal adversary is Klono (Kelana Tunjung Seta), a ferocious king who desires Candra Kirana and tries to destroy Daha to get her. Klono was adopted as a Moluccan title for a ruler as Kolano. In some versions of the story, Klono is Panji's half-brother. Other common characters are Gunung Sari (Candra Kirana's brother), Ragil Kuning or Dewi Onengan (Panji's sister, married to Gunung Sari), Wirun, Kartala and Andaga (relatives and companions of Panji).

The following are several episodes of the compilation of Panji stories:

=== Dewi Anggraeni ===
The tale of Dewi Anggraeni is a tragic love story, the prequel to the main Panji story. The story begins with the arranged marriage of Prince Panji Asmoro Bangun to Princess Candra Kirana from the twin neighboring kingdoms of Kediri and Janggala. The dynastic marriage was meant as a means of a peace agreement to reunite the two warring factions of the once great kingdom under one dynasty again. During his youth, the prince of Jenggala loved to travel the country, visit ashrams and hermitages and learn from various wise Brahmins and rishis across the kingdom. During his stay in one of the remote hermitages, the prince fell in love with a beautiful commoner girl, Dewi Anggraeni. The prince married Anggraeni and took her home to the palace in the capital city of Jenggala. The marriage of a prince to a commoner girl caused an uproar in the royal courts of both Jenggala and Kediri. The angered Kediri envoys pushed the royalty of Jenggala to keep their promise of the arranged dynastic marriage, and they threatened to wage war if the marriage to Dewi Anggraeni was not annulled. However, the love-struck Prince did not want to fulfill his royal duty and refused to marry Kirana. To avoid war, the elders of the royal house plotted the assassination of Dewi Anggraeni.

Panji and Anggraeni were separated and tricked by being told to meet in different places. Anggraeni was led by the royal troops deep into a forest to be murdered. After she learned that their action was meant to avoid war and bloodshed between two kingdoms, she willingly sacrificed herself and gave up her life. After Panji learned about the death of Anggraeni, the prince went amok, fell unconscious, and finally lost his mind. The insane prince suffered from amnesia and wreaked havoc across both kingdoms, attacking villages, authorities, lords, and bandits alike. Meanwhile, in Kediri, Princess Kirana has learned about the fate of her future husband and has decided to go out from the palace to find and help him. Princess Kirana, disguised as a man, is later involved in a battle with Panji and finally manages to cure the Prince from insanity. Surprisingly, Princess Kirana looked exactly like the late Anggraeni, as actually they both were incarnated from the same spirit, Kamaratih, the goddess of love. Panji and Kirana were then united in marriage and lived happily ever after.

=== Panji Semirang ===
The Panji Semirang tells another version of the story. The story begins with the disappearance of Candra Kirana from the palace. After Candra Kirana disappears, a princess who claims to be Candra Kirana, though different in appearance, attempts to console Prince Panji, and alleges that she was carried off by Durga, and will regain her original appearance as soon as they are married. Panji orders preparations for the wedding to resume, not knowing that the consoler is, in reality, a demon-princess who wants Panji for herself.

Meanwhile, the true Candra Kirana, alone in the forest, is advised by the gods that she must return to the palace disguised as a man to be reunited with Panji. She does so and, upon entering the city, discovers the wedding plans for the false Candra Kirana, delivers a letter to Panji revealing the true situation, and vanishes. Upon discovering this, Panji rushes to search for his love while his courtiers kill the demonic impostor.

Panji, in his search, undergoes many adventures, staying in forests with hermits, working as a servant in different palaces, always hoping to find traces of his lost bride. Candra Kirana, meanwhile, continues in her male disguise, undergoes her own set of adventures, and ends up as the king of Bali. In the climax of the story, Panji and Candra Kirana unknowingly oppose each other on the battlefield. There, as witnesses are ordered to leave, she confides to her opponent that she is the bride of Panji, and that the disguise was assumed because of a command of the gods that she could win back her prince only in a face-to-face combat where his blood is made to flow. Still not aware that she is fighting her prince, they continue the fight with swords and arrows, but she is unable to harm him until she resorts to her hairpin. As Panji is wounded, he reveals his identity, and they are happily reunited.

=== Ande Ande Lumut ===
The Ande Ande Lumut tells another version of the union between Prince Kusumayuda and Kleting Kuning. She is the youngest of four sisters, all daughters of a widow in a village within the Prince Kusumayuda's father domain. The widow's daughters were named according to colors: the eldest is Kleting Abang (Kleting Merah/Red Kleting), next is Kleting Biru (Blue Kleting), then Kleting Ijo (Green Kleting), and the youngest is Kleting Kuning (Yellow Kleting). All of Kleting Kuning's older sisters are jealous because Kleting Kuning is very beautiful. Kleting Kuning is actually an adopted foster daughter and the missing princess of Janggala kingdom, later known as Dewi Candrakirana. Keleting Kuning was betrothed to Prince Kusumayuda, and he never forgot the face of the beautiful young princess meant to be his future consort and the future queen of Banyuarum kingdom. He continued to love her and look for her even after they were separated when the princess became lost as a child.

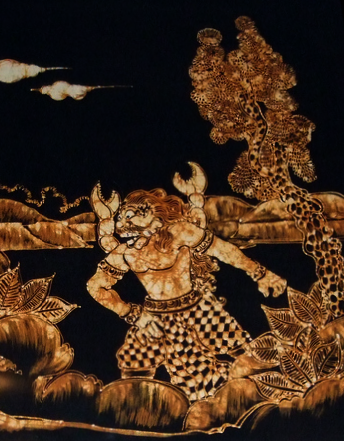
Batik depicting Yuyu Kangkang emerging from the river.

After many years of Kleting Kuning living in the village with the widow's family, a rich and handsome eligible bachelor named Ande Ande Lumut declared that he was searching for a bride. Many girls across the kingdom were smitten and interested in becoming his wife, including Kleting Kuning's sisters. Only Kleting Kuning was not interested since she had not forgotten the youthful face and betrothal to Prince Kusumayuda. However, a magical crane told Kleting Kuning to participate in this event where her true fate awaited her. All of the girls dressed up beautifully, putting on their make-up and marched together towards Ande Ande Lumut's house. However, her stepmother ordered Kleting Kuning not to dress up and even disguised her beauty in ugly and dirty clothes, hoping one of her own daughters, who were Kleting Kuning's elders, would win more favor and the bachelor's heart. She even gave her a sapu lidi (a simple broom made of coconut leaf spines) to carry in order to make Kleting Kuning look like a poor servant; however, it was actually a magical broom.

In their journey, the girls had to cross a large river without any ferry services. The river was guarded by a giant freshwater crab named Yuyu Kangkang. Yuyu Kangkang offered to take the girls across the river, riding upon its back, in return for a kiss. In order to reach Ande Ande Lumut's house as fast as possible, the girls hastily agreed on this arrangement and allowed Yuyu Kangkang to kiss them. Kleting Kuning arrived late at the river bank after he had taken the others across, and again Yuyu Kangkang offered its service for a kiss. Of course, Kleting Kuning, who always upheld her modesty and chastity, refused. Yuyu Kangkang, angered with Kleting Kuning's refusal, tried to eat her. In defense, Kleting Kuning tried to hit the crab but missed and hit the river with her broom and magically, all the water in the river dried up, and Kleting Kuning was able to cross the river safely. Yuyu Kangkang was trapped on the dry banks and was very scared, and he begged her for her mercy and forgiveness and to return the river to its home as it was before. Kleting Kuning felt sorry for him and again hit the ground with the broom, and the water returned, washing the relieved Yuyu Kangkang downstream. By then, Kleting Kuning's sisters had reached Ande Ande Lumut's house, where they were greeted kindly by Ande Ande Lumut's mother and served refreshments. Although the girls are pretty, and Ande Ande Lumut liked them, he refused all of them because he could detect the smelly, pungent fishy kiss of Yuyu Kangkang on them. Finally, Kleting Kuning arrived, dirty and simply dressed like a servant, which is how her sisters introduced her to Ande Ande Lumut's mother, who asked her to wait outside. However, Ande Ande Lumut received her warmly, as he could see the true beauty beneath and invited her in. After he speaks to her, he realizes that Kleting Kuning is the princess, his long-lost love. At that moment, Kleting Kuning also realizes that Ande Ande Lumut is actually Kusumayuda, her beloved prince. They are reunited, soon are married and live happily ever after.

=== Keong Emas ===
Another episode is the sequel to the main story. The tale of Keong Emas takes place after the union of Panji Asmoro Bangun and Sekartaji in marriage. There are several versions of the tale, but usually, the story begins with Sekartaji being magically transformed into a golden snail. The golden snail is found and kept as a pet by a poor widow fisherwoman named Mbok Rondo. Magically, Sekartaji can turn back into her human form for some period to pay back the widow's kindness by cooking her delicious dishes and cleaning her house, leaving her snail shell behind. The curious Mbok Rondo hides in waiting and finally discovers that the snail is a young woman. She breaks the snail shell and thus undoes the magic spell. Sekartaji is adopted as the widow's daughter, and together they set out to reunite her with her husband, Panji Asmoro Bangun.

One modern adaptation of the story of Panji and Candra Kirana (called Sekartaji in this version) is a musical play titled "Hayati: Panji Searching for the Essence of Love" under the direction of Rama Soeprapto and staged in Katara Opera House from 22 to 24 May 2023. It was a part of the Qatar-Indonesia Year of Culture program and commissioned by the governments of Qatar and Indonesia.
