= South Tulungagung Tunnel =

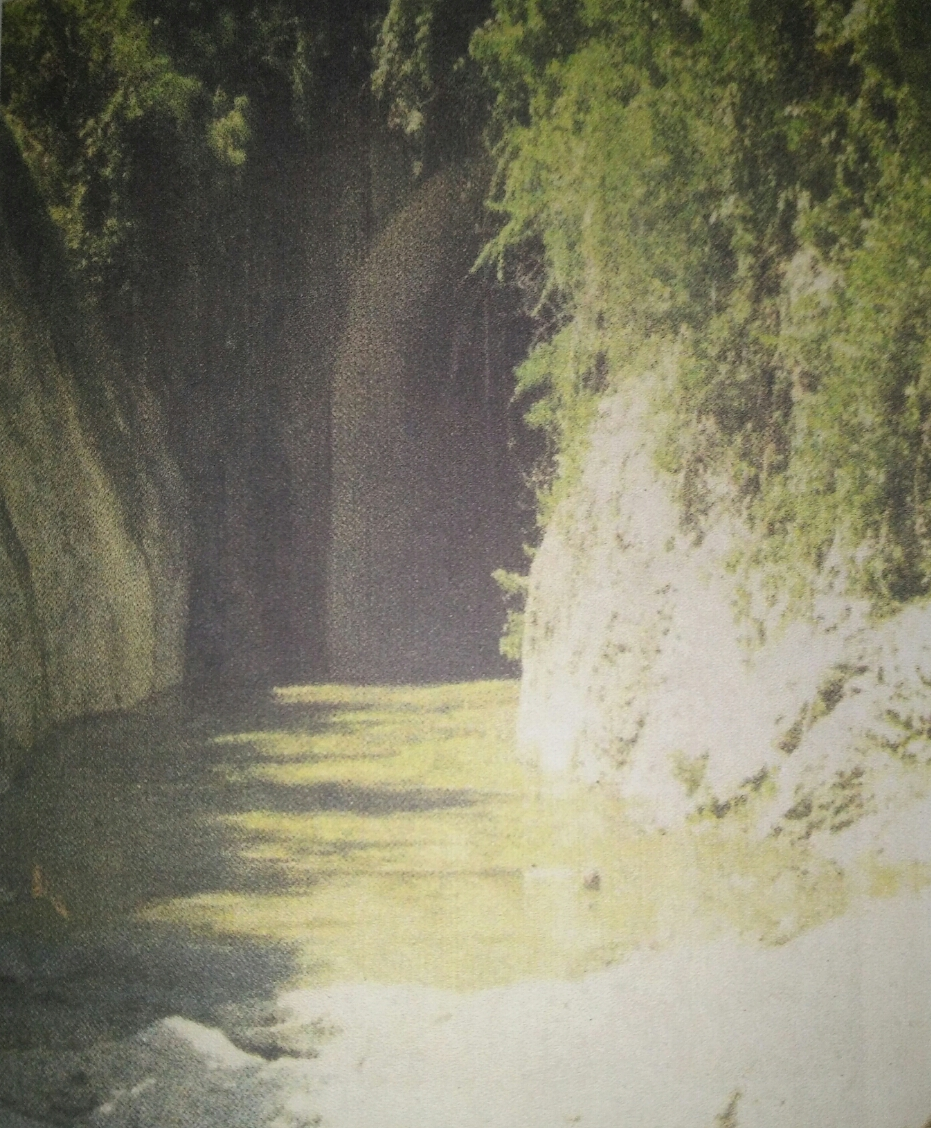
- The mouth tunnel of Neyama I, the oldest tunnel out of three currently-operating tunnel

Overview
- Official name: Terowongan Tulungagung Selatan
- Other name: Terowongan Neyama
- Coordinates: 8.2443788°S 111.7887110°E
- Status: Operating
- Crosses: Tulungagung southern mountain range
- Start: Ngasinan River; Tawing River; and Dawir River
- End: Indian Ocean

Operation
- Work began: Neyama I — 1961; Neyama II — Unknown, around October 1986
- Constructed: February 1, 1943 (Japanese colonial government-built tunnel)
- Opened: July 1944
- Closed: Before 1956, collapsed due to lack of maintenance (Japan colonial government-built tunnel)
- Rebuilt: Neyama I — 1959; Neyama II — May 1981
- Reopened: Neyama I — August 3, 1960; Neyama II — October 1986

Technical
- Length: 0.8 kilometres (0.50 miles) (known length; Japanese colonial government-built tunnel); 1 kilometre (0.62 miles); 24.2 kilometres (15.0 miles) (Neyama II)
- Operating speed: 60 cubic metres per second (2,100 cu ft/s)
- Width: 7.2 metres (24 ft)

Route map

The South Tulungagung Tunnel (Indonesian: Terowongan Tulungagung Selatan) or commonly referred to as the Neyama Tunnel (also spelt as Niyama Tunnel; Indonesian: Terowongan Neyama), is a drainage tunnel located in Besuki district, Tulungagung Regency, East Java. There are three individual tunnel under this name and each of those tunnel serves to drain some of the water from the Ngasinan River, Tawing River, and Dawir River to the Indian Ocean.

== Name ==
This tunnel common name, Neyama, was derived from Japanese word, 'Neyama' (根山) means 'root mountain'. The word 'Neyama' itself was coined by the Japanese army to refer to the hill penetrated by this tunnel. The said hill called as Tumpak Oyot by the local, which in Javanese means 'root hill', hence the name.

== History ==
=== Background ===
During the Dutch colonial era of Indonesia, there were two swamps in the southern Tulungagung, Rawa Bening and Rawa Gesikan with total combined area exceeding 3,000 hectares (7,400 acres). In the rainy season, the area of these two swamps could reach over 25,000 hectares (62,000 acres) due to the overflowing of the Ngasinan, Tawing, and Dawir rivers. Due to the said area is relatively unflooded during dry season and became completely flooded in the rainy season, local people referred to it as Campurdarat or 'area of mixed land' in English. The overflow of the three rivers was partly caused because of sendimentation of Brantas River due to the eruption of Mount Kelud, so the water from the three rivers could not be accommodated by the Brantas River.

In 1916, there was an idea to drain the water from the three rivers into the Indian Ocean to alleviate flooding in southern Tulungagung. In 1939, a plan to overcome the flooding began to be drawn up by a Dutch engineer, H. Vlughter. He came up with a plan to divert some of the water from the Ngasinan and Tawing rivers into Rawa Bening and Rawa Gesikan, so that the demand would not only flow into the Brantas River. By changing the flow of the two rivers, it was hoped that the flooding caused by the two rivers would be reduced, allowing new farmland to be cleared and the Gesikan Swamp to be drained naturally by utilising the sediment carried by the two rivers.
