= Smaradahana =

Old Javanese poem

Smaradahana Asmaradhana Asmaradana
- An Old Javanese poem (kakawin)
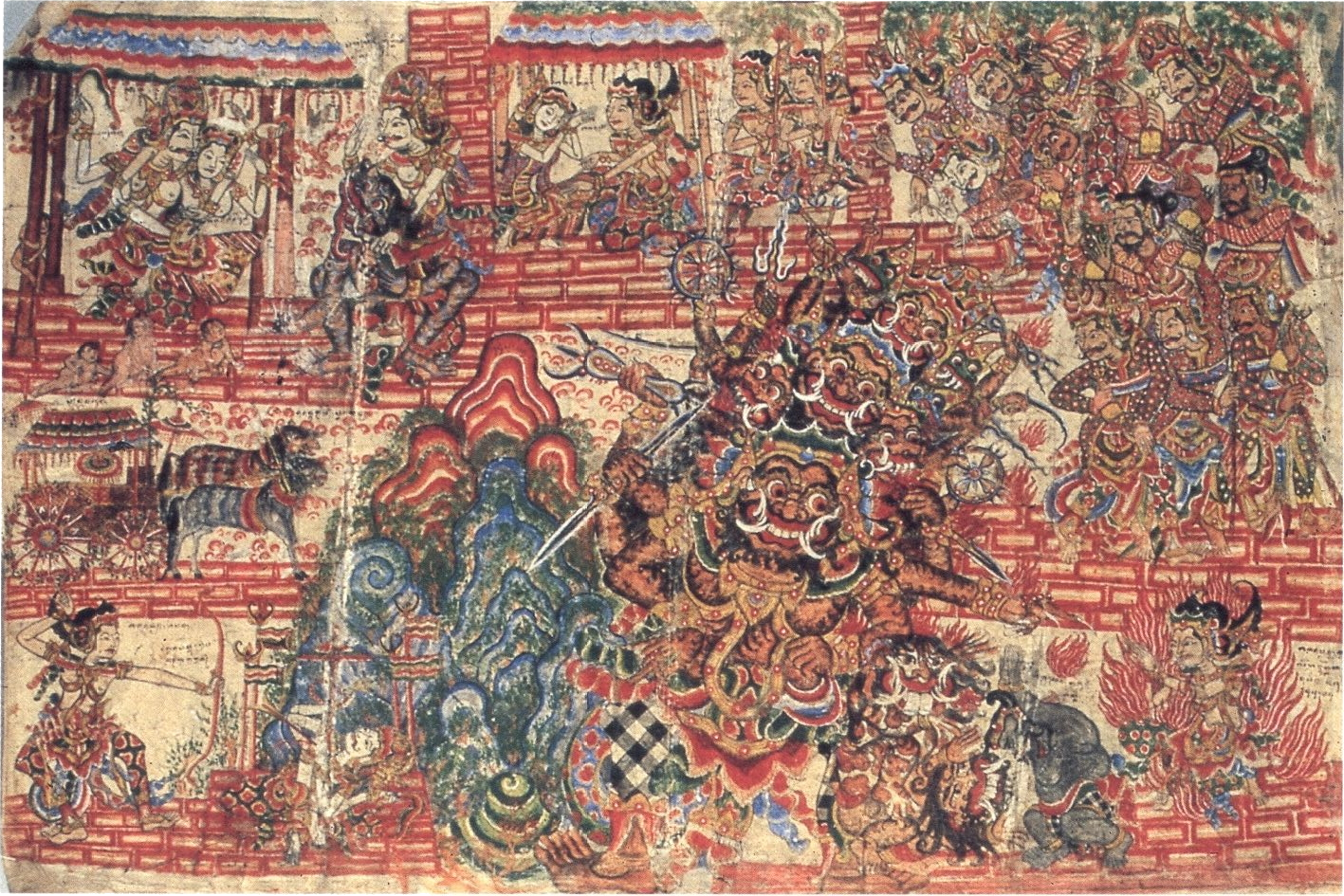
- The scenes from the Smaradahana depicted in Balinese painting made by I Ketut Gedé c. 1890
- Original title: Asmaradhana
- Country: Indonesia
- Language: Old Javanese (Kawi)

Smaradahana, also known as Smaradhana, Asmaradhana, Asmaradahana, Asmaradana, Asmarandhana, or Asmarandana is an old Javanese poem (kakawin) written by Mpu Dharmaja as the eulogy for King Kameçvara of Kediri in early-12th century East Java. The story describes the disappearance of Kamajaya (the Hindu god of love) and Kamaratih (the Hindu goddess of love) from Svargaloka after being burnt by a fire that burst from the third eye of Shiva. Their spirits fall upon the earth where incarnated as human beings, their spirits seduce and inspire lovers' hearts.

== Etymology ==
Smaradahana, Smaradhana, Asmaradhana or Asmaradahana is derived from Sanskrit words of smara and dahana. Smara means "desire", while Dahana can be translated as "burning". Thus, Smaradhana can be roughly translated as "Burning of desire" or "extinguishing the desire". Smaradhana's themes have inspired many works of art and literature in Indonesia, including stories, poems, and love songs.

== The story ==
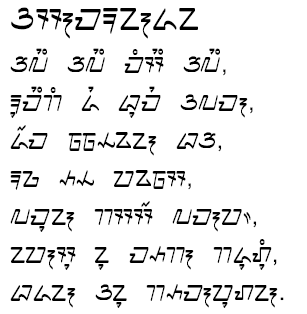
The poem of Asmarandana was written in Sundanese script.

The story begins when the goddess Parvati is feeling lonely. She missed and longed for her husband Lord Shiva, who at that time was meditating somewhere on a sacred mountaintop. She decided to send Kamadeva, a lesser love god known in ancient Java as Kamajaya, to search for Shiva. His task was to inspire love in Shiva's heart, to make him yearn for his wife.

Using the bow and arrow of love tipped with a flower, Kamajaya shot the meditating Shiva. Suddenly Shiva felt the desire to see his wife. His heart was filled with memories of past love-making with Parvati, so he promptly stopped his meditation. However, when Shiva opened his eyes, he caught sight of Kamajaya hiding behind a rock. Angered by the fact that Kamajaya, the lesser god, had dared to disturb his meditation, fire burst out from his third eye and burnt Kamajaya to ashes. Kamajaya's wife, the goddess Rati, known in ancient Java as Kamaratih, out of her love, devotion, and loyalty, jumped into Shiva's fire to follow her husband. They both died in the flames, disappeared from Svargaloka, and vanished from the realm of gods.

The spirits of the couple, the divine lovers Kamajaya and Kamaratih, fell upon earth, into the realm of human beings. Frequently incarnated as two lovers, constantly searching for each other on earth, the spirits of Kamajaya and Kamaratih symbolize love, lust, desire, and the yearning that inspires seduces, and is suffered by all lovers on earth.

== History ==
Mpu Dharmaja wrote Smaradahana during the reign of Kameçvara, the second king of Kediri during the second quarter of the 12th century. Historians believe that in addition to Dharmajaya's intention to transmit the Hindu mythology of Kamadeva being burnt by Shiva's fire (interpreted by the Sanskrit poet Kalidasa in Kumārasambhava), it was also intended to explain the essence of love and desire in human beings. It is strongly suggested that the poem was also Dharmaja's eulogy for the king.

Smaradahana celebrated Kameçvara as a strikingly handsome man, while his queen consort Çri Kirana was noted for her extraordinary beauty. The poem portrayed the king as the incarnation of Kamajaya, the Hindu god of love, and proclaimed that his capital city Dahana (or Daha) was admired throughout the known world. Kameçvara's wife, Çri Kirana, was celebrated as the incarnation of Kamaratih, the Hindu goddess of love and passion.

The Smaradhana became a predecessor to the Panji cycle tales, where Raden Inu Kertapati (or Panji Asmoro Bangun) is portrayed as the incarnation of Kamajaya, while Dewi Chandra Kirana (or Sekartaji) is depicted as the incarnation of Kamaratih. The Panji tales spread throughout Southeast Asia (Indochina Peninsula (a region that includes modern-day Thailand, Cambodia, Laos, Myanmar, South Vietnam) and South East Asia Archipelago as well).

== Gallery ==
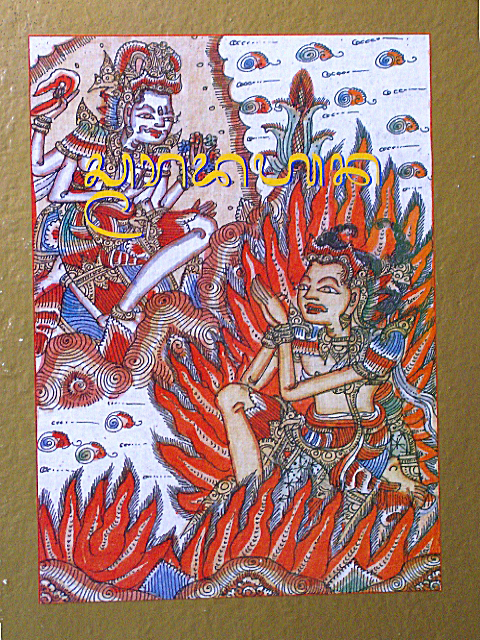
Kama being burnt by Shiva. From the cover of a book released by the Balinese Education Council.
