= Kamadjaja =

Indonesian journalist

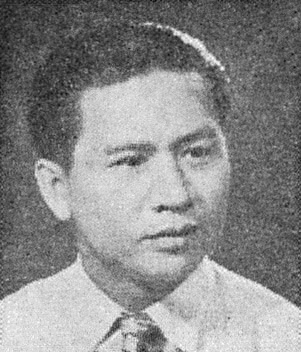
- Kamadjaja in 1950
- Born: Karkono Partokusumo; 23 November 1915; Sragen, Central Java, Dutch East Indies
- Died: 5 July 2003 (aged 87); Yogyakarta, Indonesia
- Occupations: Journalist, writer
- Years active: 1934–1995

Karkono Partokusumo (23 November 1915 – 5 July 2003), better known by the pen name Kamadjaja (Perfected Spelling: Kamajaya), was an Indonesian journalist and author, who rose to prominence during the Japanese occupation of the Dutch East Indies.

== Early life and career ==
Karkono was born in Sragen, Central Java, Dutch East Indies, on 23 November 1915. He conducted his education to the junior high school level in nearby Surakarta, then continued his studies at a Taman Siswa school for teachers in Yogyakarta. Though he finished the program, Karkono never became a teacher. Rather, early on he developed an interest in writing, submitting many of his pieces to newspapers, magazines, and youth movement periodicals. Kamadjaja was politically active as well. In 1931 he became the head of the Surakarta branch of Indonesia Moeda; he remained active in the youth movement through the 1930s.

Karkono had entered journalism by 1934, when he is recorded as an editor for Soeloeh Pemoeda Indonesia. Around this time he also contributed to Garuda Merapi, a Yogyakarta-based periodical published by Indonesia Moeda, as well as Oetoesan Indonesia (under Oemar Said Tjokroaminoto) and the Surakarta-based Sedyo Tomo (under Raden Roedjito). Whilst with this last publication, he wrote a pointed article about Noto Soeroto, a prominent figure in the Mangkunegaran Palace. This led Mangkunegara VII to pen a decree barring Karkono from living or working in the Mangkunegaran region, though this decree was never issued. In 1937, Karkono was made the head of Perantaraan, the magazine of the Taman Siswa Alumni Organisation; he also joined the organisation as an administrator. It was around this time that he took up the pen name Kamadjaja, taken from the God of Love in the Javanese kakawin Smaradahana.

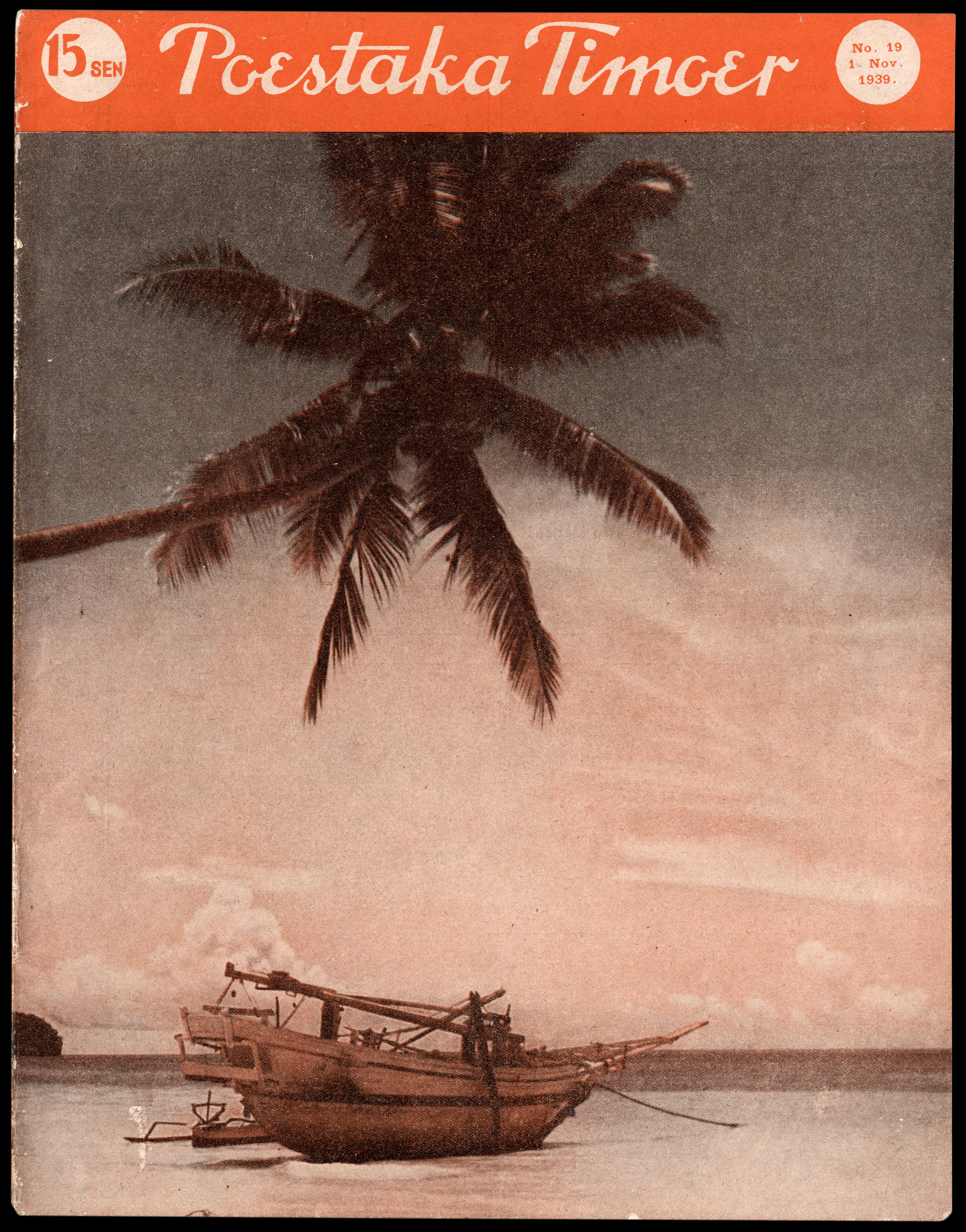
Kamadjaja joined Poestaka Timoer in 1939

Kamadjaja stayed with Perantaraan for two years. In 1939, he became an editor of the cultural magazine Poestaka Timoer, working with Andjar Asmara. He stayed with the magazine until 1941, when he migrated to the colonial capital Batavia (now Jakarta) and established the film magazine Pertjatoeran Doenia dan Film together with B.M. Diah and Nasrun Angkat Sultan. When Berita Oemoem, a conservative publication headed by Soekardjo Wirjopranoto and Winarno Hendronoto, was moved from Bandung to Batavia, Kamadjaja was brought on as an editor.

== Japanese occupation and National Revolution ==
In March 1942, the Empire of Japan occupied the Dutch East Indies. Initially Kamadjaja remained in journalism, taking a position with the Japanese-established daily Asia Raya, as did many of Berita Oemoem's staff. Kamadjaja led the newspaper's publication division and worked to publish the first Asia Raya almanac. During this time he published a short story, "Memoedja Majat Kekasih" ('Worshipping a Lover's Corpse'), in the paper.

Kamadjaja migrated to the theatre in 1943, joining Andjar Asmara and Andjar's wife Ratna in establishing the Tjahaja Timoer theatrical troupe. The troupe, whose actors were mostly youths, toured throughout Java. Before the occupation ended in 1945, Kamadjaja has written several stage plays, including Diponegoro (1943), Solo Diwaktu Malam ('Solo at Night', 1943), Kupu-Kupu ('Butterflies', 1944), and Miss Neng (1944, a sequel to Solo Diwaktu Malam). He also adapted the Chinese legend Butterfly Lovers as Sam Pik Eng Tay (1944). On 23 August 1945, a week after Sukarno proclaimed the independence of Indonesia, Tjahaja Timoer was disbanded.

Together with Rinto Ali, Sjamsuddin Sutan Makmur, and Usmar Ismail, Kamadjaja established the newspaper Rakjat in Jakarta (renamed during the Japanese occupation) and wrote a column, "Bang Golok" ('Brother Machete'). However, tensions were rising between the Indonesian republicans and the returning Dutch colonial forces, and in December 1945 Kamadjaja's home was raided by Dutch forces. He soon took a train to Republican-held Surakarta, where he helped establish the Serikat Rakjat Indonesia (Indonesian People's Union), became a member of the Regional People's Representative Council for Surakarta, and joined the Dewan Pertahanan Daerah (Regional Defense Council). In 1948, as the Indonesian National Revolution continued, Kamadjaja was made a major in the Indonesian Army and the head of Brigade XXIV's education department.

Later in 1948, Kamadjaja was made a titular Finance Ministry Aid in Singapore, serving under Ambassador Mukarto Notowidagdo. Despite his title, Kamadjaja's main task was smuggling opium into Singapore, with the proceeds supporting Indonesian military and diplomatic efforts. Together with Tony Wen and Subeno, he arranged a route in which speedboats loaded with opium left Popoh Beach near Tulungagung, East Java, and went to Singapore. Later trips were made by aircraft from Tulungagung and by boat from Pacitan, East Java. In November 1948, Kamadjaja returned to Indonesia via Bangkok and Bukittinggi, for fear that he was being hunted by the Dutch and British police.

== After Indonesian Independence ==
After the revolution, Kamadjaja focused predominantly on politics and business. He was a member of the Indonesian National Party, active in both Surakarta and Yogyakarta. He participated in conferences throughout Asia, Africa and Europe, as well as in the United States.

Kamadjaja retained, however, an interest in culture, working to preserve Javanese literature through such initiatives as the Panunggalan Foundation. In 1950, a novel adaptation of Solo Diwaktu Malam was published by Gapura. The story was also adapted to film by Nawi Ismail in 1952. This Borobudur Films production starred Chatir Harro, Komalasari, RAS Sumarni, and Astaman.

Kamadjaja wrote a book in 1972 based on the case of "Sum Kuning", a teenage girl from Bantul, Special Region of Yogyakarta, who was put on trial after accusing several well-connected youths of raping her. This book later became the basis for the film Perawan Desa, which was controversial in the Yogyakarta region but garnered numerous awards at the Indonesian Film Festival, including Best Film.

By the 1990s Kamadjaja was running a publishing house, using his own funds as capital. Its publications included an Indonesian-language edition of the Serat Centhini as well as the Dewi Sri almanac. He was also involved with such organisations as the Yogyakarta Art Council and the Organisation of Javanese Writers.

Kamadjaja died in Panti Rapih Hospital, Yogyakarta, on 5 July 2003 at the age of 87. He was survived by his wife and two children. After a funeral attended by hundreds of mourners, he was buried at the Wijaya Brata Cemetery, which is dedicated to prominent members of the Taman Siswa organisation.

== Works cited ==
- Heru C.N. (5 July 2003). "Jenazah Ki Karkono Kamajaya Partokusumo Dimakamkan di Wijaya Brata" [Body of Ki Karkono Kamajaya Partokusumo Buried at Wijaya Brata]. Tempo (in Indonesian). Jakarta. Archived from the original on 7 April 2016.
- "K dari Ensiklopedi Pers Indonesia" [K in the Indonesian Press Encyclopedia] (in Indonesian). Reporters Association of Indonesia. Archived from the original on 9 April 2016.
- Kamadjaja (1950). Solo Diwaktu Malam [Solo at Night] (in Indonesian). Jakarta: Gapura. OCLC 22260659.
- Mahayana, Maman S. (2007). Ekstrinsikalitas Sastra Indonesia [Extrinsic Events in Indonesian Literature] (in Indonesian). Jakarta: RajaGrafindo Persada. ISBN 978-979-769-115-8.
- Mark, Ethan (2011). "Indonesian Nationalism and Wartime Asianism: Essays from the "Culture" Column of Greater Asia, 1942". In Saaler, Sven; Szpilman, Christopher W A (eds.). Pan-Asianism: A Documentary History: Volume 2: 1920–Present. Lanham: Rowman & Littlefield. pp. 233–242. ISBN 978-1-4422-0601-4.
- "Perawan Desa". Filmindonesia.or.id (in Indonesian). Konfiden Foundation. Archived from the original on 3 April 2016.
- "Riwayat Hidup Ringkas dan Ciptakarya Haji Karkono Kamajaya Partokusumo" [Short Biography and Bibliography of Haji Karkono Kamajaya Partokusumo]. Apa dan Siapa H. Karkono Kamajaya Pk.: Kenangan Ulang Tahun ke-80, 23 Nopember 1915 s/d 23 Nopember 1995 [Who and What: H. Karkono Kamajaya Pk.: Commemorating his Eightieth Birthday, 23 November 1915 to 23 November 1995] (in Indonesian). Yogyakarta: Ikatan Penerbit Indonesia. 1995. pp. 9–23. OCLC 34973613.
- Soebagijo I.N. (1981). Jagat Wartawan Indonesia [Universe of Indonesian Journalists] (in Indonesian). Jakarta: Gunung Agung. OCLC 7654542.
- "Solo Di Waktu Malam". Filmindonesia.or.id (in Indonesian). Konfiden Foundation. Archived from the original on 11 April 2016.
