= Kediri kingdom =

Javanese kingdom, ca. 1042–1222

Pañjalu Kāḍiri 1042–1222 ꦥꦁꦗꦭꦸ (Javanese) Daha 1292–1293 ꦣꦲꦤ (Javanese)
- 1042–1293
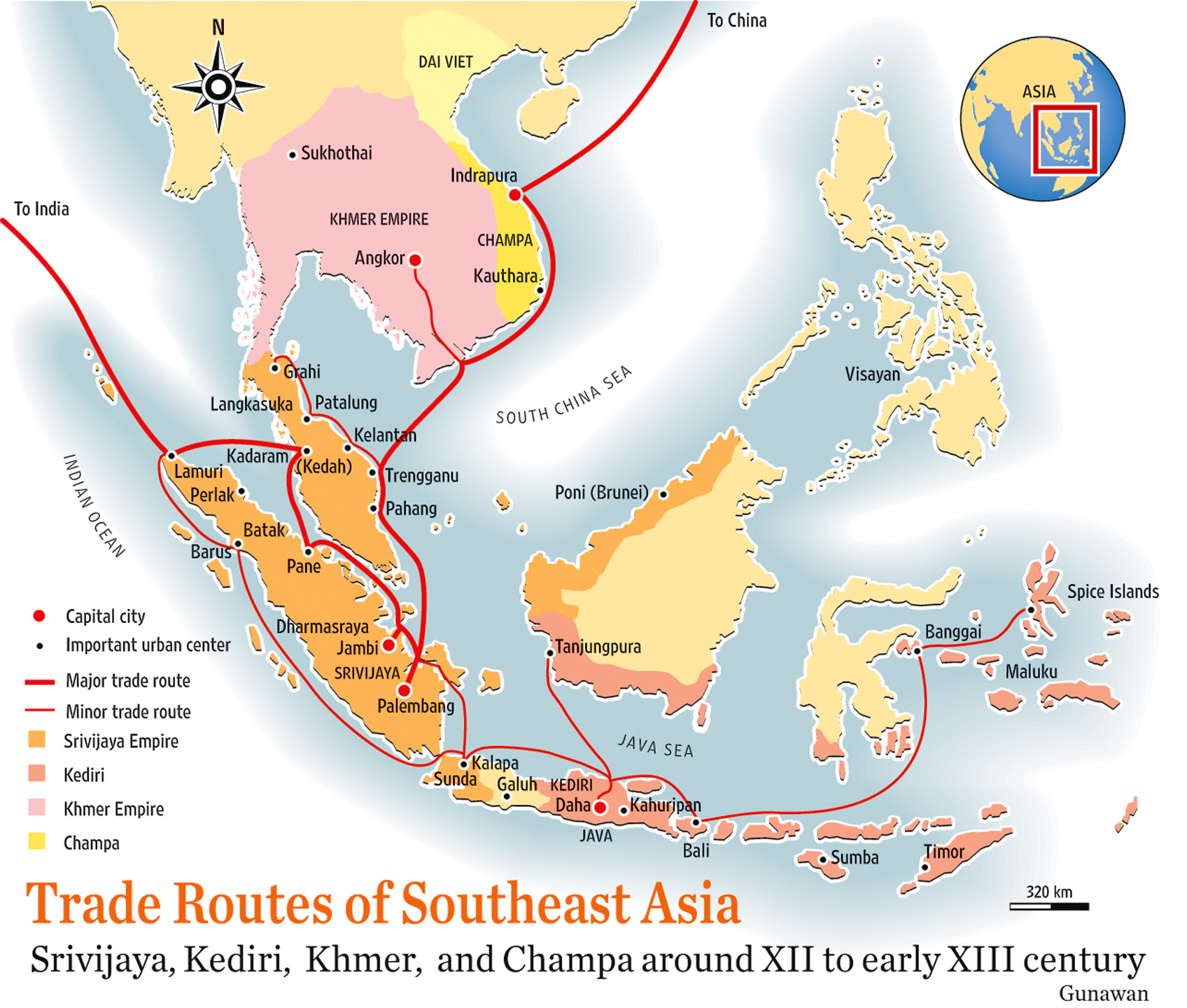
- Janggala and Panjalu later unified as Kediri kingdom
- Capital: Dahanapūra (modern Kediri)
- Common languages: Old Javanese, Sanskrit
- Religion: Hinduism (Main); Buddhism; Animism
- Government: Monarchy
- King/Maharaja
  - 1042–1051: Śrī Samaravijaya
  - 1135–1159: Śrī Jayabhaya
  - 1182–1191: Śrī Kāmeśvara
  - 1191–1222: Śrī Kṛtajaya
  - 1292–1293: Śrī Jayakatyĕng
- Historical era: Medieval Southeast Asia
  - Airlangga divided his kingdom into Janggala and Panjalu: 1042
  - Janggala conquered by Jayabaya: 1135
  - Kakawin Bharatayuddha finished writing: 1157
  - Kertajaya defeat to Ken Arok of Singhasari: 1222
  - Revival of the Kediri by Jayakatwang: 1292
  - Conquered by the Mongols and Majapahit: 1293
- Currency: Native gold and silver coins
Preceded by	Succeeded by
Kahuripan	Singhasari; Majapahit

Kediri Kingdom or Kadiri, also known as Panjalu, was a Hindu-Buddhist Javanese kingdom based in East Java from 1042 until 1222 (1292–1293 under Jayakatwang). This kingdom is centered in the ancient city Dahanapura, despite the lack of archaeological remains, the age of Kediri saw much development in classical literature. Mpu Sedah's Kakawin Bharatayuddha, Mpu Panuluh's Gatotkacasraya, and Mpu Dharmaja's Smaradhana blossomed in this era. The kingdom's capital is believed to have been established in the western part of the Brantas River valley, somewhere near modern Kediri city and surrounding Kediri Regency.

== Etymology and names ==
The city of Daha existed before the founding of the kingdom. Daha is an abbreviation of Dahanapura, which means city of fire. This name is listed in the Pamwatan inscription issued by Airlangga in 1042. This is following the news in Serat Calon Arang, that at the end of Airlangga's reign, the center of the kingdom was no longer in Kahuripan, but has moved to Dahanapura and calls Airlangga the king of Daha.

15. Soon arriving at Sagara Rupek, he crossed there, the priest Baradah. The priest's journey is not told on the way he was very fast. He immediately arrived at the kingdom of Daha, met his son, Maharaja Erlangga, who was facing..

— (Lontara Calon Arang).

=== Panjalu ===
The kingdom was also known as Panjalu (the correct reading being Pangjalu) as the twin kingdom with Janggala. During the reign of Jayakatwang that revived the short-lived second dynasty of Kadiri, the kingdom is also known as Gelang-gelang or Gegelang. Other than Kadiri, the kingdom was also often referred to as Daha or Dahanapura, after its capital. The name Daha was used in the later Majapahit period, as the seat of the rival court of Trowulan.

In the beginning, the name "pañjalu" (pangjalu) was used more often than the name Kediri. This can be found in the inscriptions published by the kings of Panjalu. The name Panjalu is also known as Pu-chia-lung in the Chinese chronicle entitled Ling wai tai ta (1178).

Three types of land were used by the community in the past when building settlements and other things. The first is called Anupa, and it is land that has fertile soil, is close to springs, and allows various kinds of seeds to grow well if planted there. The second is called Sadarana, and it is land that in some areas is fertile and in others less fertile. The third is called Janggala, and it is infertile land or wilderness.

The word Pangjalu comes from the word Jalu which means male (Indonesian jantan) and the prefix Pang (Indonesian pe-, thus Indonesian pejantan, or one who is male), and in this regional context means a fertile and independent area. The term Kadiri is a synonym of the word Pangjalu, and it also means independent. This case is similar to the name Majapahit with Wilwatikta, where wilwa is maja fruit while tikta is bitter, as well as between Jiwana, which is another name for Kahuripan in Sanskrit.

=== Kadiri ===
The name Kadiri or Kediri the correct reading is Kadhiri, also thought to come from the word Sanskrit word Khadri which means India Mulberry (Morinda citrifolia), locally known as pacé or mengkudu tree. The bark of morinda produces a brownish-purplish dye for batik-making, while its fruit has medicinal values. A similar named city is also known Kadiri in Andhra Pradesh, India.

The origin of the word that is considered more appropriate is derived from the word "kāḍiri" (kadhiri) in the Old Javanese language which means being able to stand alone, be independent, stand tall, have personality, or be self-sufficient. Reviewing several inscriptions issued by the kings of Panjalu, this can be seen phrase in the Ceker inscription from 1107 Saka (1185 AD) which reads:

"... śrī mahārāja mantuk śīma nira ring bhūmi kaḍiri ..."

Translation of the inscription: (Sri Maharaja has returned to his kingdom, or his hope in bhumi Kadhiri)

In the Kamulan inscription dated 1116 Saka or (1194 AD) it also reads:

"... tatkāla ni n kentar sangke kaḍatwan ring katangkatang deni nkin malṛ yatik kaprabhun śrī mahārāja siniwi riŋ bhūmi kaḍiri.."

Translation of the inscription: (when he left his palace in Katang-katang so that he could still exercise his rule as Sri Maharaja who reigned in bhumi Kadhiri)

== Founding of Kediri ==
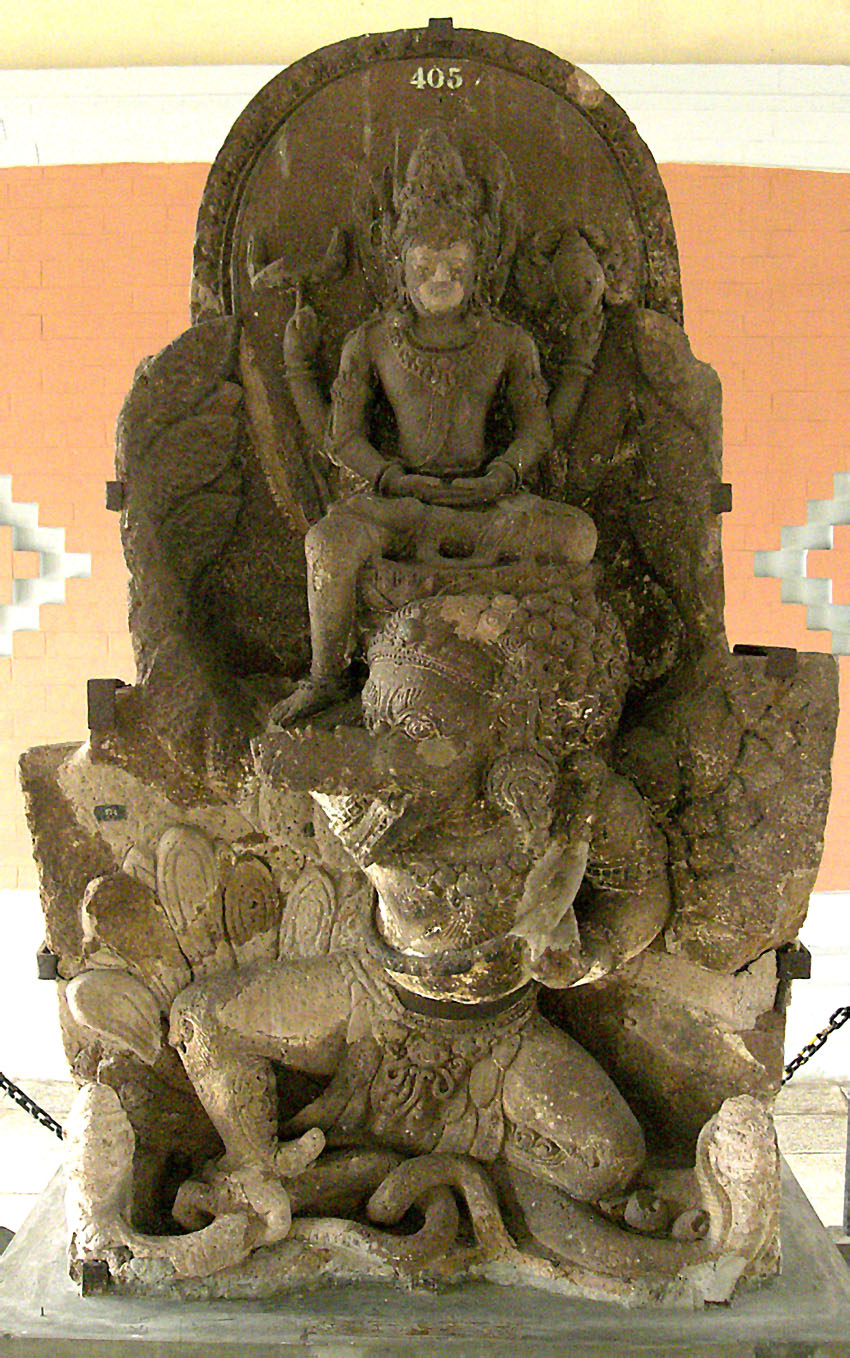
Airlangga's embodiment statue as Lord Vishnu riding Garuda, found in Belahan, collection of Trowulan Museum, East Java.

The Kingdom of Kediri is the successor of Airlangga's Kahuripan kingdom and is thought of as the continuation of the Isyana Dynasty in Java. In 1042, Airlangga divided his kingdom of Kahuripan into two, Janggala and Panjalu (Kadiri), and abdicated in favour of his sons to live as an ascetic. He died seven years later.:

.. 1. Such was the case of that kamal (tamarind tree), known on account of a tradition, fixed,

and the Illustrious Panjalu-Protector in Daha, the moment of Yawa-land (Java)'s going into two halves.

The Illustrious Airlangghya (Erlangga), He caused, in His love for his children, the honoured two Prabhus (to be)...
— (Nagarakretagama, Canto 68).

The Wurare inscription carved at the foot of the Mahaksobhya statue during the Singhasari period, tells of two new regions that had been divided by the priest Aryya Bharada. According to the Marimbong Inscription (1264 AD), the boundary between the two regions is the Bengawan River.

5-6. Which has divided the plains of Java into two parts with the outer boundary being the ocean, by means of a jug (kumbha) and its holy water from the sky (vajra). The holy water that has the power to break the earth and is given to the two princes, avoids hostility and disputes - therefore Janggala is strong as victory Panjalu (vishaya).

— (Wurare inscription)

== Reigns of Kediri kings ==
Çri Samaravijaya (1042–1051). It is thought that he was the first to ascend the throne of Kediri at the beginning of the kingdom, because in the inscriptions issued by Airlangga he had previously served as crown prince (rakryan mahamantri hino).

The first king of Kediri who left historical records was Çri Jyitêndrakara Parakrama Bhakta (1051–1112) who left the Mataji inscription (1051 M).

It is not known for certain when Çri Jyitêndrakara abdicated the throne. He was then replaced by Çri Bamesvara who took the throne of the Kingdom of Kediri. The lanchana (royal seal) of his reign was a skull with a crescent moon called chandrakapala, a symbol of Shiva. During the reign of Maharaja Çri Bamesvara himself, there were at least ten inscriptions containing the development of East Java, written between 1112 and 1135.

Jayabhaya (1135–1159) succeeded Bamesvara. His formal stylised name was Çri Maharaja çri Dharmmeçwara Madhusudanawataranindita Suhrtsingha Parakrama Digjayottunggadewa. The Lanchana of his reign Narasinghavatara depicts one of the avatars of Lord Vishnu, namely Narasinghavatara. His form is described as a human with a lion's head tearing the stomach of Hiranyakasipu (King of the Giants). The name is Jayabhaya was immortalised in Sedah's Kakawin Bharatayuddha, a Javanese version of the Mahabharata, written in 1135. This Kakawin was perfected by his brother, Mpu Panuluh. Mpu Panuluh wrote Hariwangsa and Gatotkacasraya. Jayabhaya's reign was considered the golden age of Old Javanese literature. The Prelambang Joyoboyo, a prophetic book ascribed to Jayabhaya, is well known among Javanese. It predicts that the archipelago would be ruled by a white race for a long time, then a yellow race for a short time, be glorious again. The Jayabhaya prophecies mention Ratu Adil, the Just Prince, a recurring popular figure in Javanese folklore. During the reign, Ternate was a vassal state of Kediri.

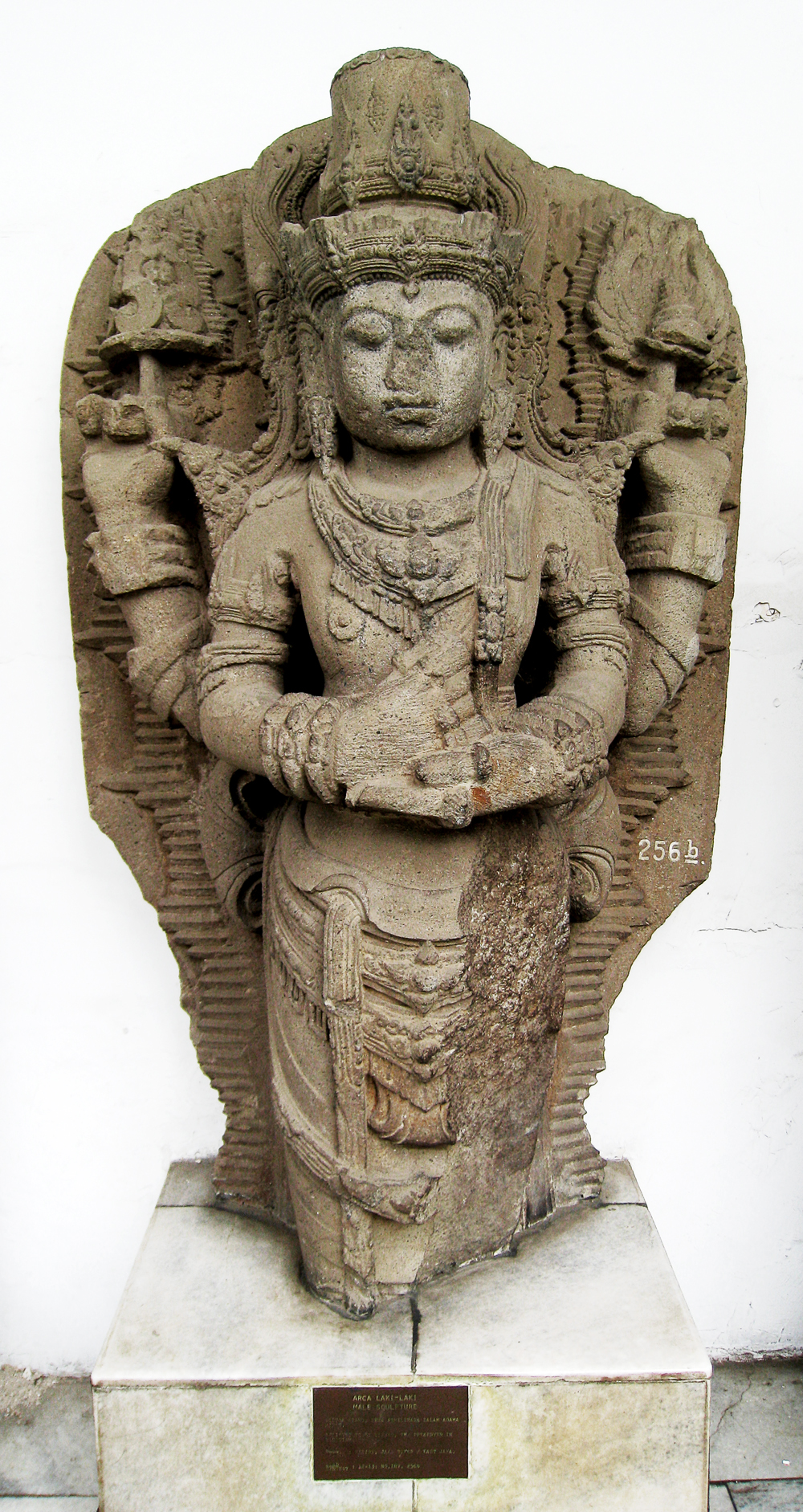
Statue of Vishnu. Kediri, East Java, c. 12th–13th century

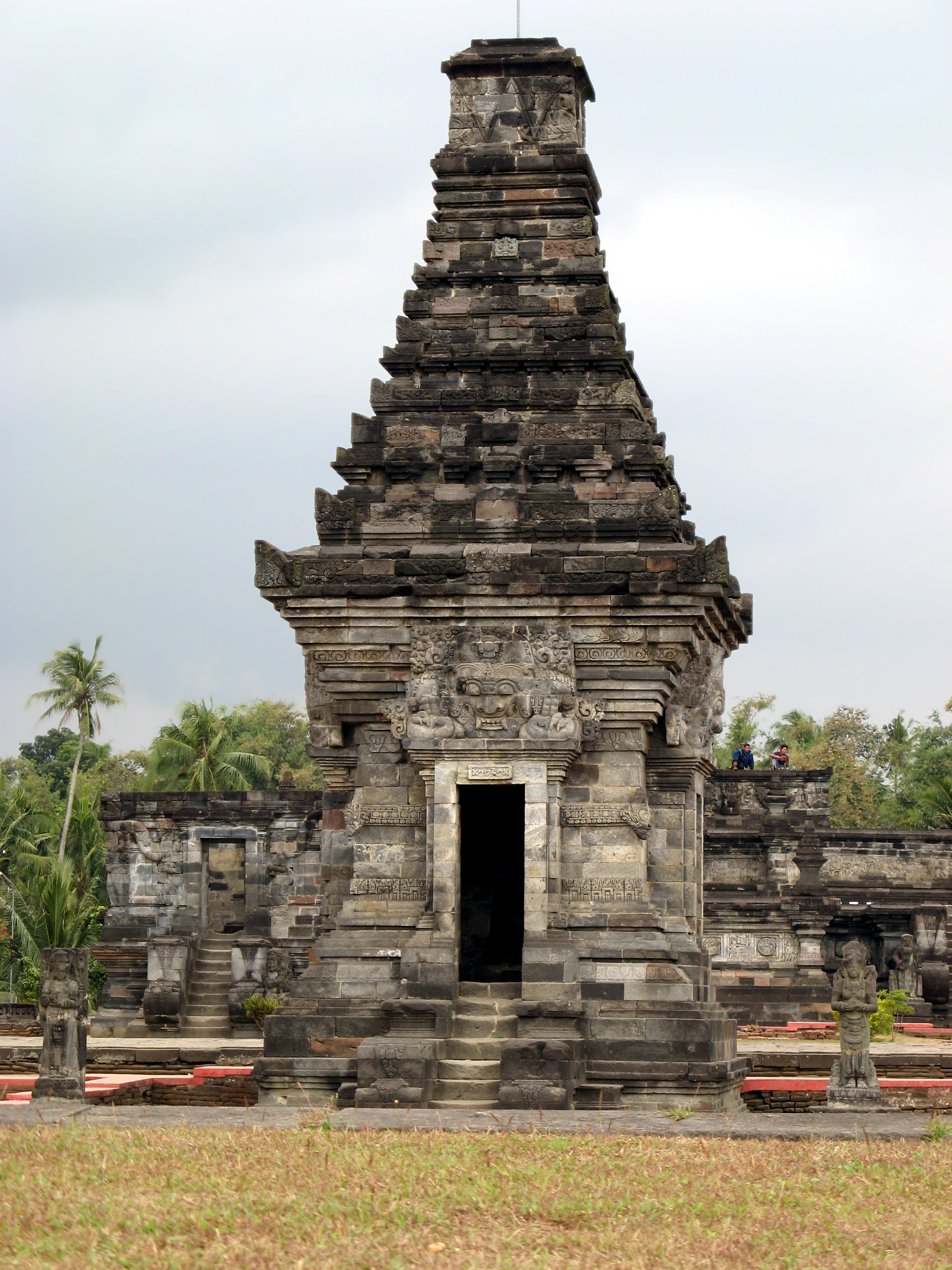
Temple Penataran is a temple that is four centuries old because it was built and developed by several kingdoms at once, starting from the Kingdom of Kediri to Majapahit.

Jayabhaya's successor was Çri Sarweçwara/Sarvesvara (1159–1171) the royal symbol is named Sarwecwaralanchana, wing-shaped numbering nine and at the end, there is a crested circle. Where everything is surrounded by three striped circles.

followed by Çri Aryyeçwara/Aryyesvara (1171–1181), who used Ganesha the elephant-headed god as Lanchana of his kingdom. and became the (royal seal) of his reign and the Kingdom of Kadiri as stated in the inscription.

The next monarch was King Gandra his formal stylised name was Çri maharaja çri Kroncarryadipa Handabhuwanapalaka Parakramanindita Digjayottunggadewanama çri Gandra. An inscription (dated 1181) from his reign documents the beginning of the adoption of animal names for important officials, such as Kbo Salawah, Menjangan Puguh, Lembu Agra, Gajah Kuning, and Macan Putih. Among these highly ranked officials mentioned in the inscription, there is a title Senapati Sarwwajala, or laksmana, a title reserved for navy generals, which means that Kediri had a navy during his reign.

The eighth king was Kameçvara (Kameswara). His formal stylised name was Çri Maharaja Rake Sirikan çri Kameçvara Sakalabhuwanatustikarana Sarwaniwaryyawiryya Parakrama Digjayottunggadewa. He uses the (winged shell) as his royal seal under the name Kamecwaralanchana. During his reign, Mpu Dharmaja wrote Smaradhana, in which the king was adored as the incarnation of Kamajaya, the god of love, and his capital city Dahana was admired throughout the known world. Kameçvara's wife, Çri Kirana, was celebrated as the incarnation of Kamaratih, the goddess of love and passion. The tales of this story, known as the Panji cycle, spread throughout Southeast Asia as far as Siam.

The last king of Kediri was Kritajaya/Kertajaya (1194–1222), King Çrngga or Kritajaya ruled Kediri, with the official name Çri maharaja çri Sarwweçwara Triwikramawataranindita Çrngga lanchana Digwijayottunggadewa. He used a Crnggalanchana picture of (Cangkha) flanked by two horns and continued with the words "Krtajaya" above. The presence of dominant horns makes this badge called Crnggalancana or horned badge. In 1222, he was forced to surrender his throne to Ken Arok and so lost the sovereignty of his kingdom to the new kingdom of Singhasari. This was the result of his defeat at the battle of Ganter. This event marked the end of the Kediri era, and the beginning of the Singhasari era.

== Golden age ==
=== Relations with regional powers ===
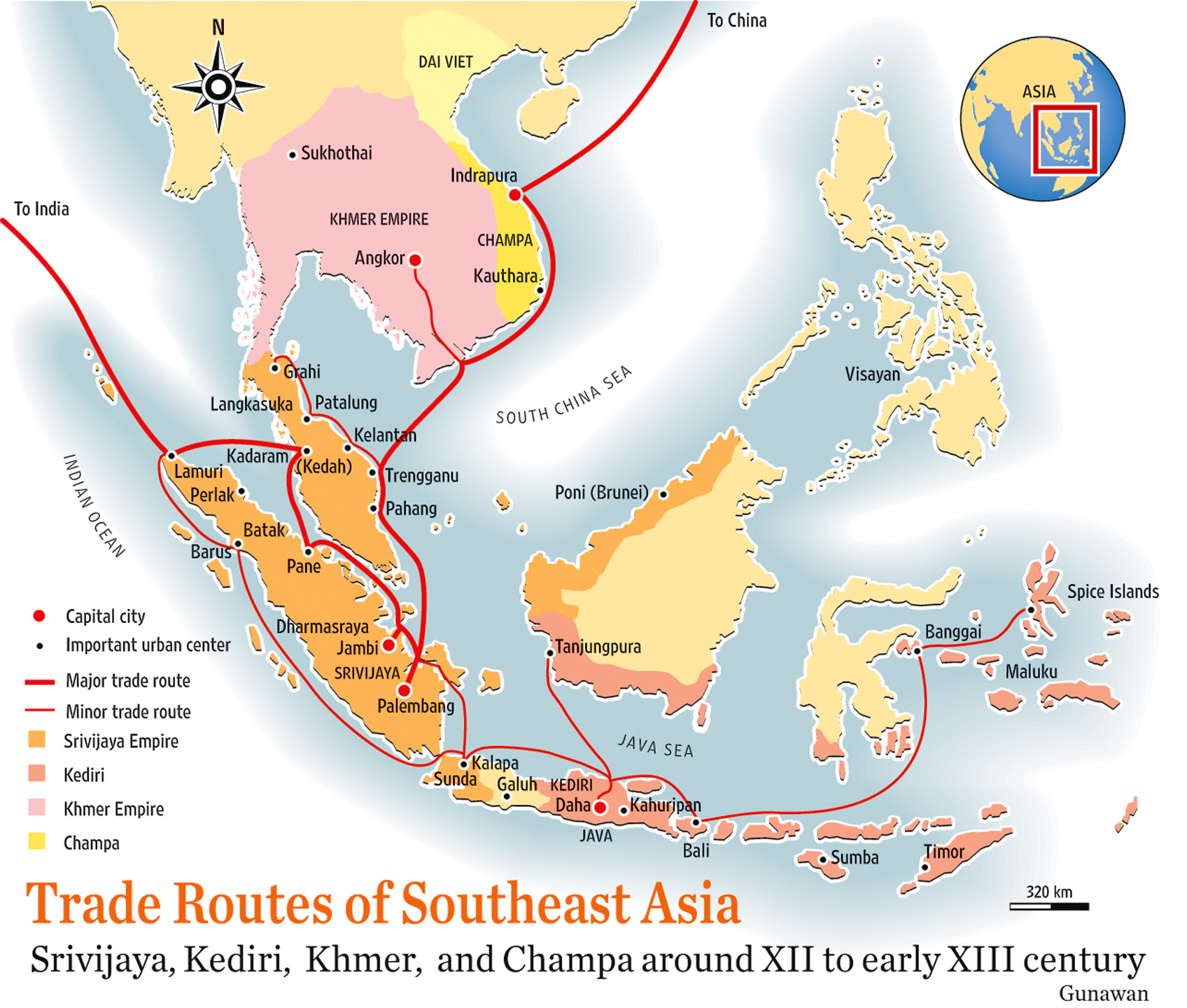
Srivijaya and Kediri around the 11th to early 12th century

The Kediri kingdom existed alongside the Srivijaya empire based in Sumatra throughout the 11th to 12th century and seems to have maintained trade relations with China and to some extent India. Chinese accounts identify this kingdom as Tsao-wa or Chao-wa (Java). The number of Chinese records signifies that Chinese explorers and traders frequented this kingdom. Relations with India were cultural, as several Javanese rakawi (poets or scholars) wrote literature that was inspired by Hindu mythology, beliefs, and epics such as Mahabharata and Ramayana.

In the 11th century, Srivijayan hegemony in the Indonesian archipelago began to decline, marked by Rajendra Chola's invasion of the Malay Peninsula and Sumatra. The Chola king of Coromandel conquered Kedah from Srivijaya. The weakening of Srivijayan hegemony has enabled the formation of regional kingdoms, like Kediri, based on agriculture rather than trade. Later Kediri managed to control the spice trade routes to Maluku.

According to a Chinese source in the book of Chu-fan-chi written around 1225, Chou Ju-kua described that in the Southeast Asian archipelago, there were two powerful and rich kingdoms: Srivijaya and Java (Kediri). In Java, he found that people adhere to two religions: Buddhism and the religion of Brahmin (Hinduism). The people of Java were brave and short tempered, daring to put up a fight. Their favourite pastimes were cockfighting and pigfighting. The currency was made from a short-tempered mixture of copper, silver, and tin.

The book of Chu-fan-chi mentioned that Java (Kediri) was ruled by a maharaja, who ruled several colonies: Pai-hua-yuan (Pacitan), Ma-tung (Medang), Ta-pen (Tumapel, now Malang), Hi-ning (Dieng), Jung-ya-lu (Hujung Galuh, now Surabaya), Tung-ki (Jenggi, West Papua), Ta-kang (Sumba), Huang-ma-chu (Southwest Papua), Ma-li (Bali), Kulun (Gurun, identified as Gorong or Sorong in West Papua or an island in Nusa Tenggara), Tan-jung-wu-lo (Tanjungpura in Borneo), Ti-wu (Timor), Pingya-i (Banggai in Sulawesi), and Wu-nu-ku (Maluku).

Regarding Sanfoqi (Srivijaya), Chou-Ju-Kua reported that Kien-pi (Kampe, in northern Sumatra) with armed forced rebellion had liberated themselves from Srivijaya, and crowned their king. The same fate befell some of Srivijaya's colonies on the Malay Peninsula that liberated themselves from Srivijaya domination. However, Srivijaya was still the mightiest and wealthiest state in the western part of the archipelago. Srivijaya's colonies were: Pong-fong (Pahang), Tong-ya-nong (Trengganu), Ling-ya-ssi-kia (Langkasuka), Kilan-tan (Kelantan), Fo-lo-an, Ji-lo-t'ing (Jelutong), Ts'ien-mai (?), Pa-t'a (Paka), Tan-ma-ling (Tambralinga, Ligor or Nakhon Si Thammarat), Kia-lo-hi (Grahi, northern part of Malay peninsula), Pa-lin-fong (Palembang), Sin-t'o (Sunda), Lan-wu-li (Lamuri at Aceh), and Si-lan. According to this source, in the early 13th century Srivijaya still ruled Sumatra, the Malay peninsula, and western Java (Sunda).

Regarding Sunda, the book details that the port of Sunda (Sunda Kelapa) was excellent and strategically located and that the pepper from Sunda was among the best quality. The people worked in agriculture; their houses were built on wooden piles (rumah panggung). However, the country was infested with robbers and thieves.

== Culture ==
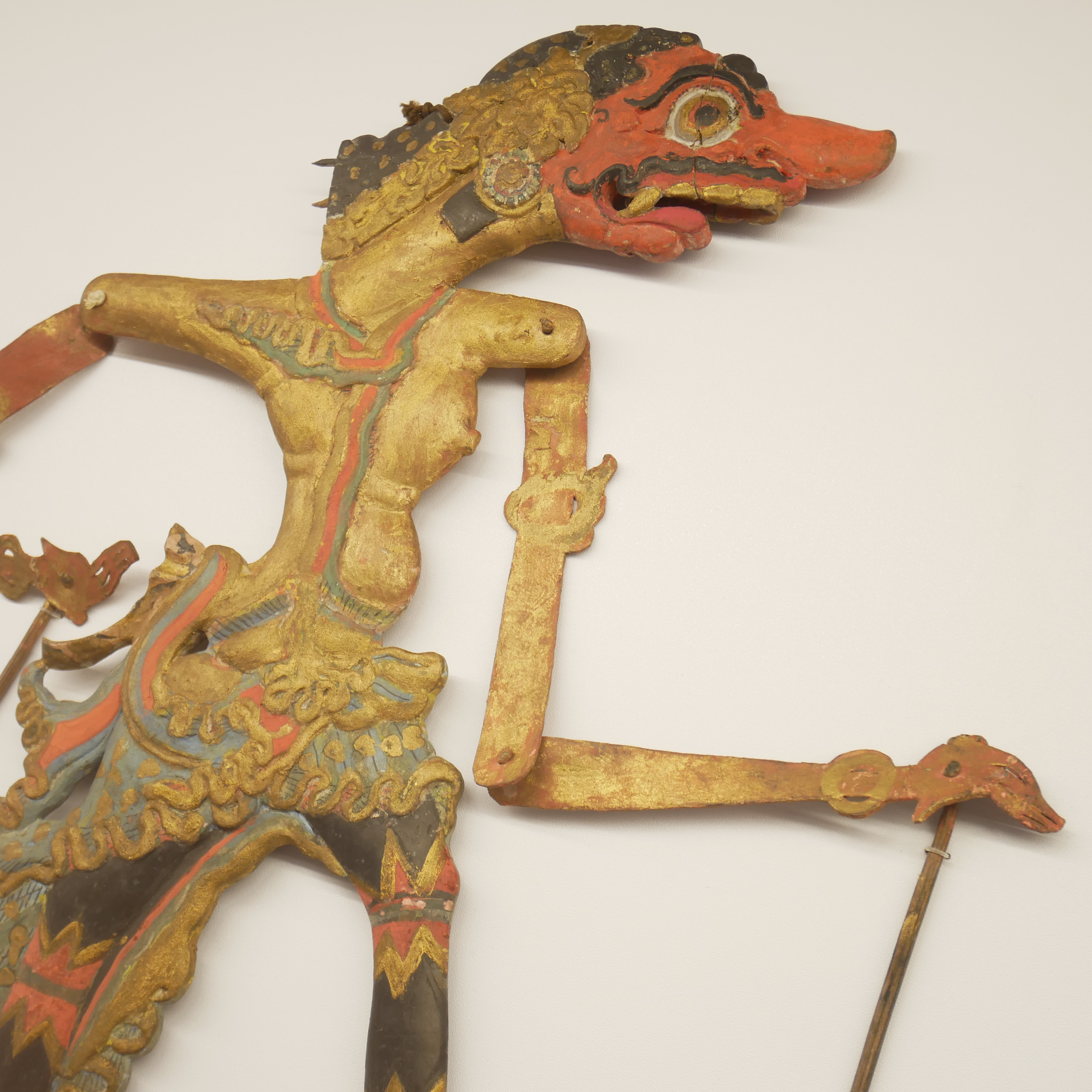
Wayang Kulit puppet of Panji Brajanata―the prince of Kediri Kingdom.

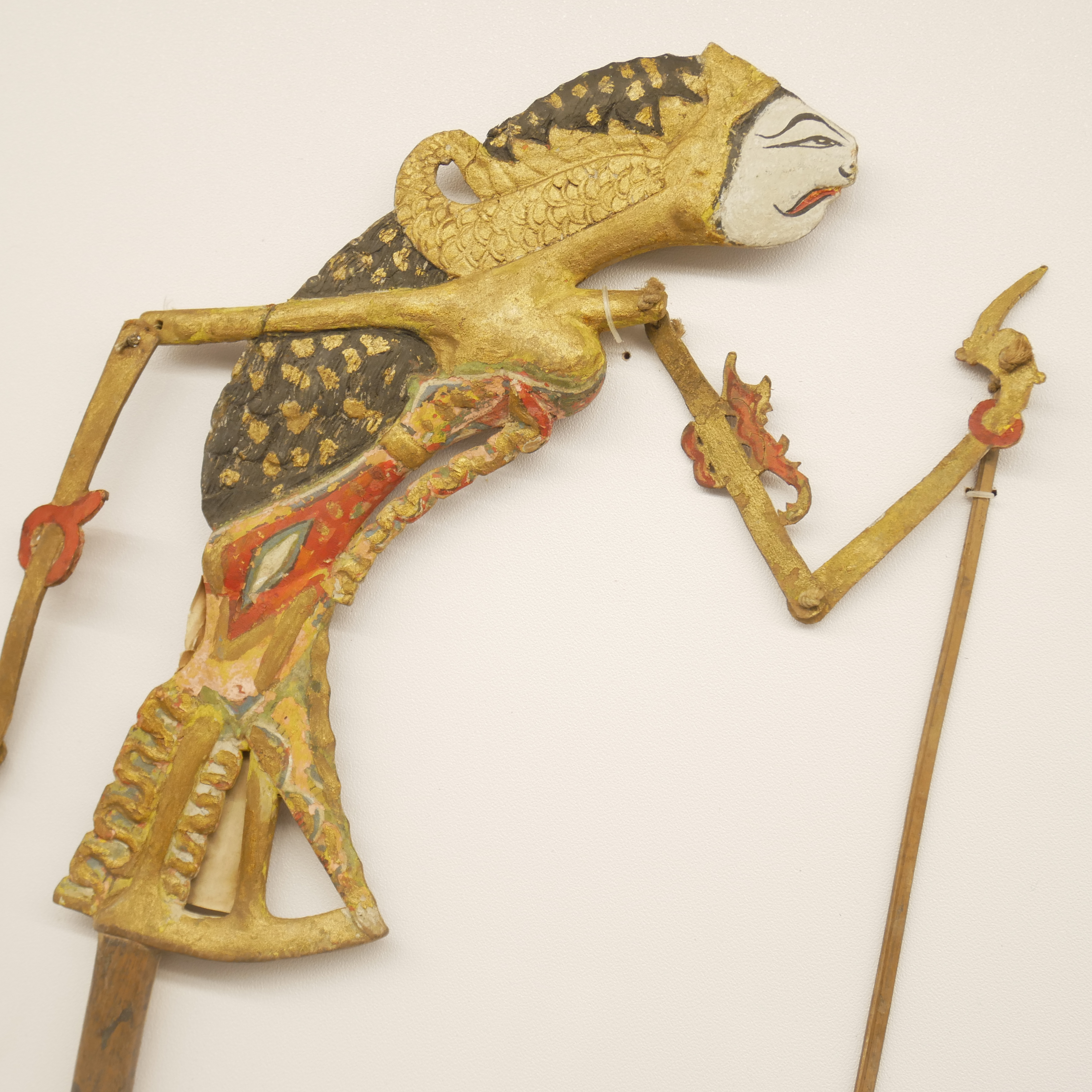
Wayang Kulit puppet of Dewi Ragil Kuning―the princess of Kediri Kingdom.

Celebrated as an era of blossoming literature, Kediri produced significant contributions in the field of Javanese classic literature. Next to the literary works already mentioned, Śiwarātrikalpa and Wrtasancaya by Mpu Tanakung, Krisnayana written by Mpu Triguna, and Sumanasantaka by Mpu Monaguṇa are also notable.

The book of Ling-wai-tai-ta composed by Chinese author Chou K'u-fei in 1178, gave a glimpse of everyday life in Kediri that cannot be found in any other source material, about the government and people of Kediri. According to Chou K'u-fei, people wore clothes that covered them down to their legs, with a loose hairstyle. Their houses were clean and well arranged with floors made from green or yellow cut stones. Agriculture, animal farming, and trading flourished and gained the full attention of the government. He reported that silkworm farms to produce silk and cotton clothes had been adopted by the Javanese by that time. There was no physical punishment (jail or torture) of criminals. Instead, the people who committed unlawful acts were forced to pay fines in gold, except for thieves and robbers who were executed. In marital customs, the bride's family receives some amount of bride price from the groom's family. Instead of developing medical treatment, the Kediri people relied on prayers for Buddha.

On the 5th month of the year, a water festival was celebrated with people travelling in boats along the river to celebrate. In the 10th month, another festival was held in the mountains. People would gather there to have fun and perform music with instruments such as flutes, drums, and wooden xylophones (an ancient form of gamelan).

The King wore silk garments, leather shoes, and ornate golden jewellery. He wore his hair up high on his head. Every day, he would receive state officials, and managers of his kingdom, on a square throne. After an audience, the state official would bow three times to the king. If the king travelled outside the palace, he rode an elephant and was accompanied by 500–700 soldiers and officials while his subjects, the people of Kediri, prostrated themselves as the king passed.

== Economy ==
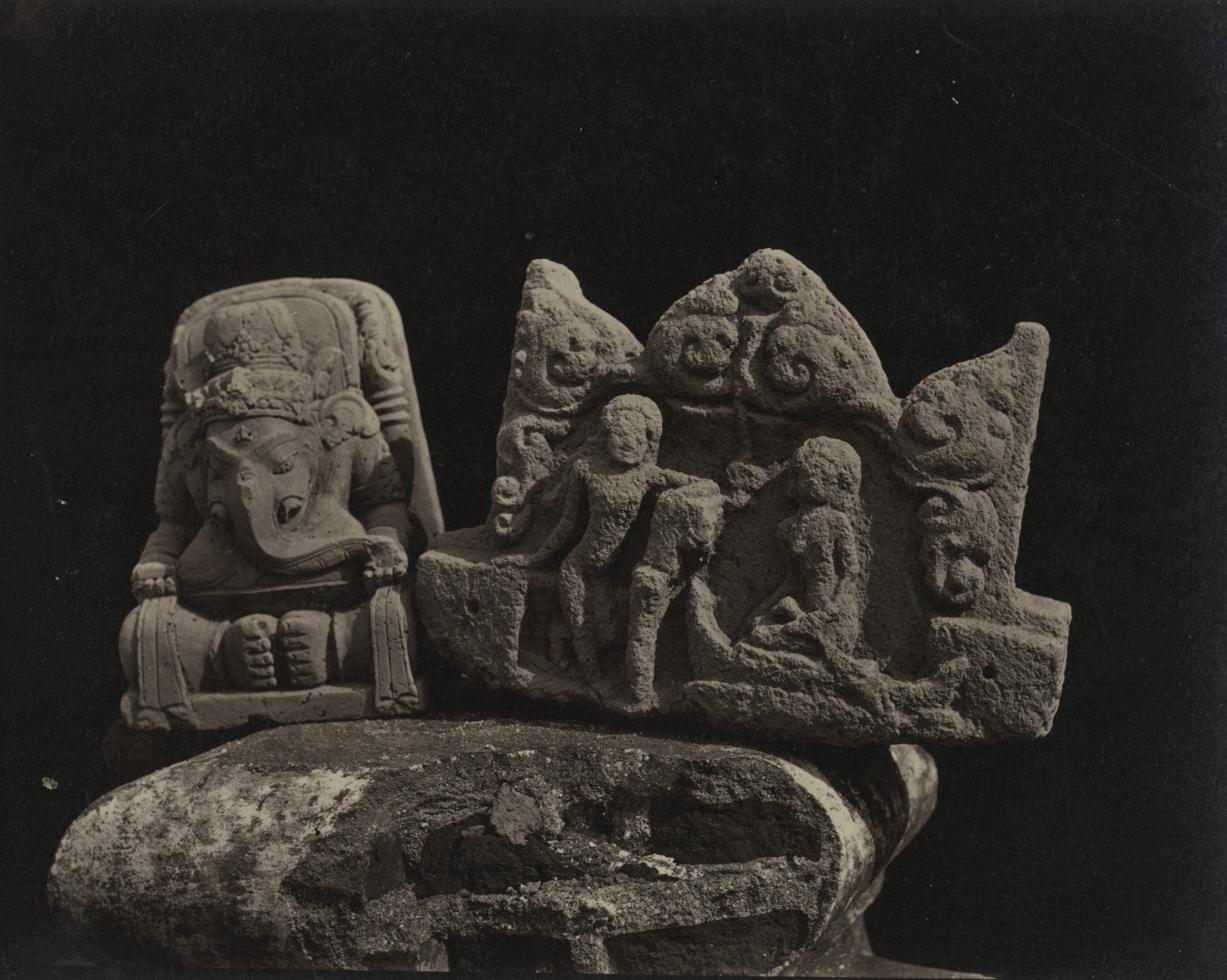
Ganesha and a fragment of a temple at the residency in Kediri, 1866–1867

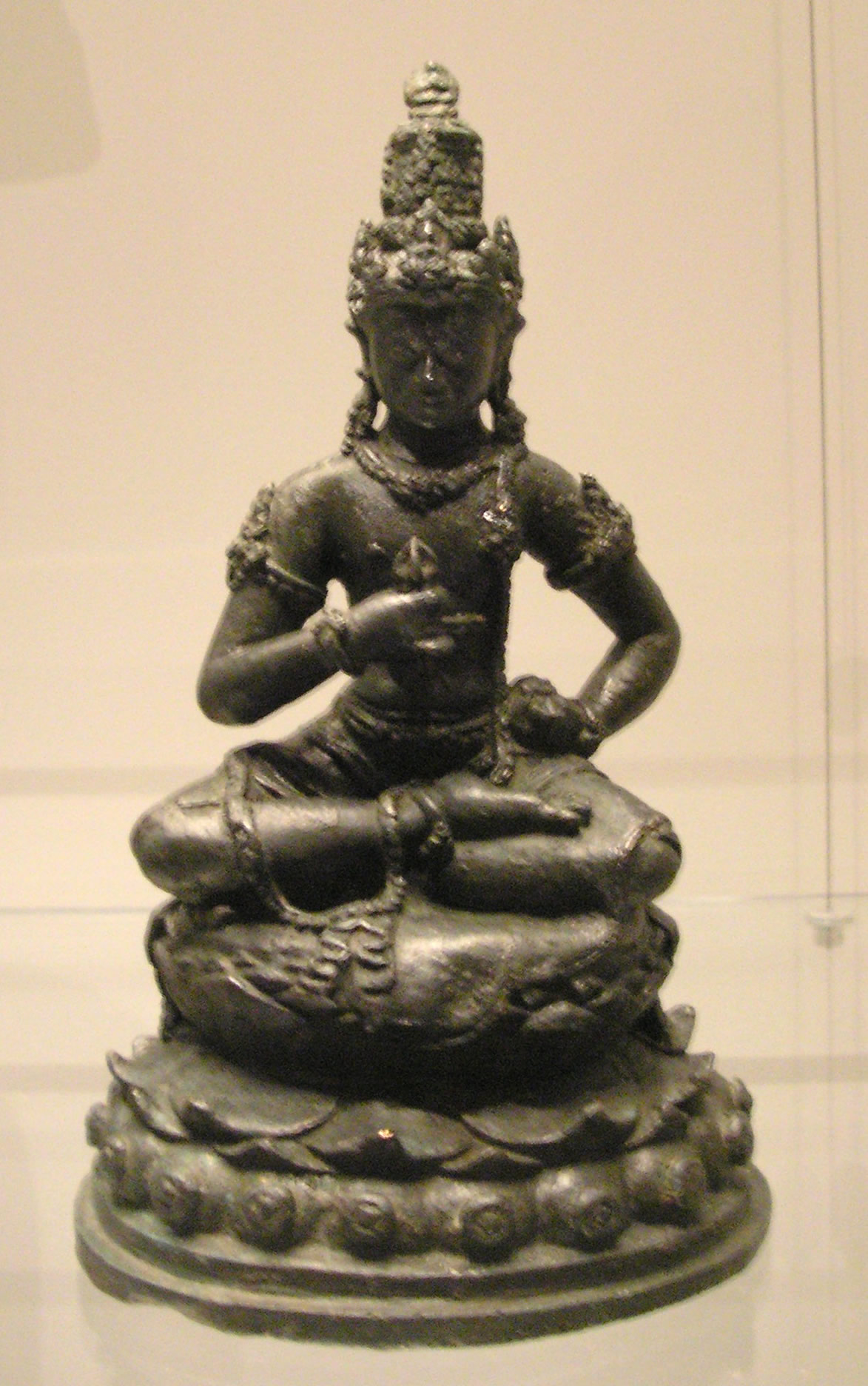
Vajrasattva. Eastern Java, Kediri period, 10th–11th century CE, bronze, 19.5 x 11.5 cm

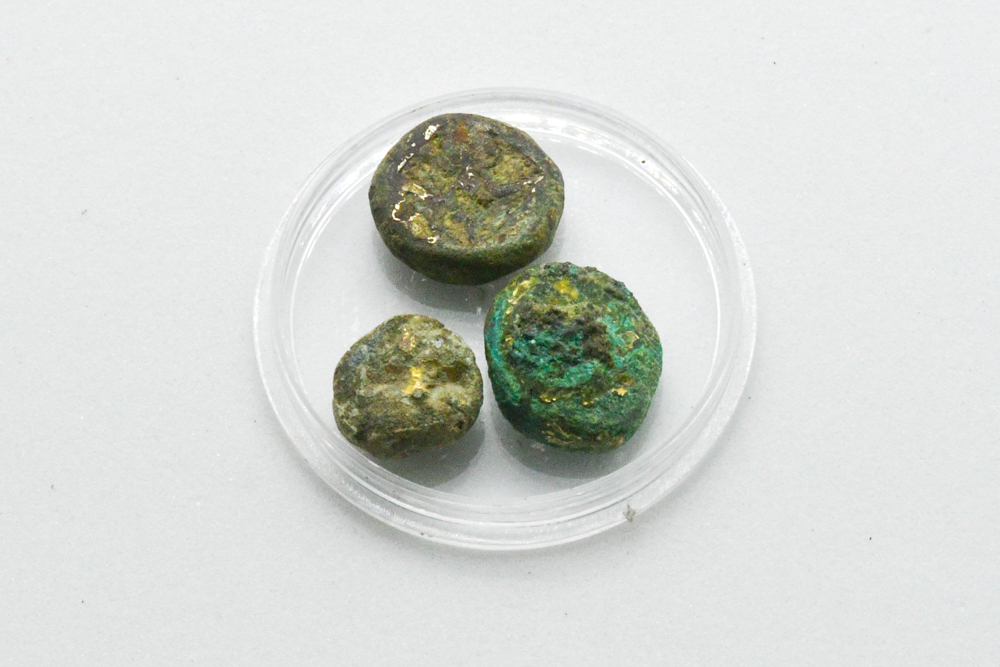
Jenggala-Kediri era gold coins

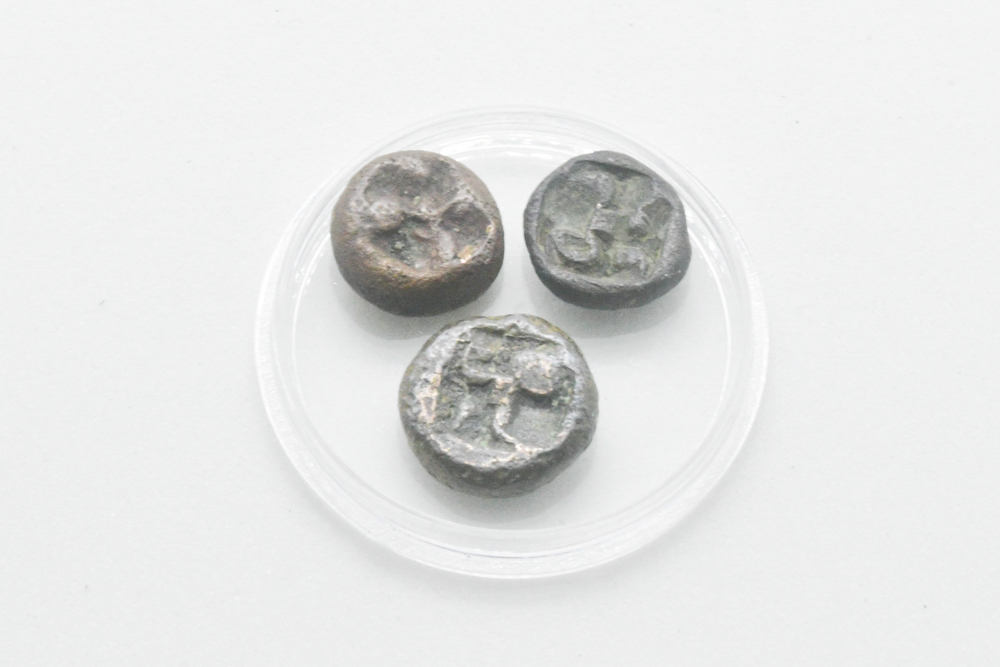
Jenggala-Kediri era silver coins

According to Chinese sources, the main occupations of the Kediri people revolved around agriculture (rice cultivation), animal farming (cattle, boar, poultry), and the spice trade. Daha, the capital city of Kediri, (suggested to be at the same site as modern Kediri) is located inland, near the fertile Brantas river valley. From the predecessor kingdom of Airlangga's Kahuripan, Kediri inherited irrigation systems, including the Wringin Sapta dam. Kediri economy was partly monetised, with silver coins issued by the royal court.

In later periods, Kediri economy grew to rely more heavily on trade, especially the spice trade. This resulted from Kediri's development of a navy, allowing them to control the spice trade routes to eastern islands. Kediri collected spices from tributaries in southern Kalimantan and the Maluku Islands. Indians and Southeast Asians then transported the spices to Mediterranean and Chinese markets by way of the Spice Route which linked a chain of ports from the Indian Ocean to southern China.

== Demise ==
=== Fall of Kediri ===
The kingdom of Kediri collapsed during the reign of Kertajaya, and is told in Pararaton and Nagarakretagama. In 1222 Kertajaya was fighting against the brahmins. Then the Brahmins asked for protection from Ken Arok akuwu of Tumapel. Incidentally, Ken Arok also aspires to liberate Tumapel which is Kadiri's subordinate area. The climax of the battle between Kadiri and Tumapel occurred near the village of Ganter (Genter), in the eastern region of Kediri. Ken Arok's troops managed to destroy Kertajaya's troops. Thus, the era of the Kediri Kingdom ended, which from then on became the vassal of Tumapel or Singhasari. After Ken Arok defeated Kertajaya, Kediri became an area under the rule of Singhasari. Ken Arok appointed Jayasabha, son of Kertajaya, as regent of Kediri. In 1258 the waning Jayasabha named Sastrajaya. In 1271 Sastrajaya faded into, namely Jayakatwang.

.. 2. In the past, at the going away of Him, the Illustrious Kertajaya there, in Shaka oceans-Manus-one (1144 = 1222 A.D.),

the order of the Illustrious Mountains' Overlord (Shiwa)'s Son was: Jayasabha is he who shall take his place in being obeyed. In Shaka eight-one-one (1180 = 1258 A.D.) Shastrajaya, again, resided in the land of Kadiri.

In Shaka three-nine-Shangkaras (1193 = 1271 A.D.) lord Jaya Katwang (Jaya the Redoubtable) was Protector, the last...
— (Nagarakretagama, Canto 44).

=== Jayakatwang rebellion ===
In 1292, Jayakatwang rebelled against Singhasari led by Kertanegara, because of past grudges where his ancestor Kertajaya was defeated by Ken Arok. After successfully killing Kertanegara, Jayakatwang rebuilt the kingdom of Kediri but lasted only one year due to a combined attack launched by Yuan dynasty troops and Raden Wijaya troops who later founded Majapahit.

=== Sudarma Wisuta ===
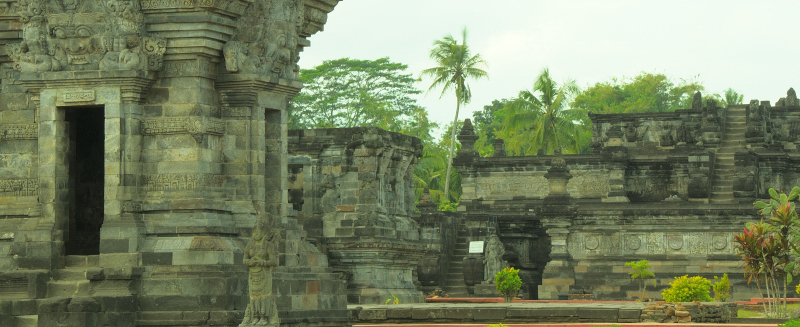
The grandest and widest temple in East Java is located on the southwestern slopes of Mount Kelud, north of Blitar. It is estimated that it was built during the reign of King Srengga of the Kadiri Kingdom.

According to Jiyu and Petak inscriptions, during the end of the Majapahit era in the 15th century, there was a brief resurrection of Daha (Kediri) as the centre of political power, which was led by Girindrawardhana in 1478 after he managed to defeat Kertabhumi. But it was short lived since descendant of Bhre Kertabhumi who became ruler of Demak crushed Daha in 1527.

== Rulers of Kediri ==
The Kings of Panjalu in the land of Kadiri

Period of reign	Personal name	King/Maharaja	Inscriptions
Airlangga when the capital was in Daha, Panjalu.
1042	Airlaṅgadeva	Śrī Mahārāja Rakai Halu Śrī Lokeśwara Dharmmawaṅsa Airlaṅganāntawikramottuṅgadewa (Śrī Lokeswara)	Mentioned in the Pamwatan inscription (1042), Nagarakretagama (1365) and Calon Arang.
Division of the kingdom's territory.
1042-1051	Samaravijaya	Rakryān Mahāmantri I Hino Śrī Samarawijaya Dhārmmasuparṇawāhana Têguh Uttuṅgadewa (Śrī Samarawijaya)	Mentioned in the inscription of Pucangan (1041), Pandan (1042), Pamwatan (1042), Simanglayang (1046).
1051-1112		Śrī Mahārājyitêndrakara Wuryyawīryya Parākrama Bhakta (Śrī Jitendrakara)	Mentioned in the Mataji inscription (1051).
1112-1135		Śrī Mahārāja Rakai Sirikan Śrī Bāmeśwara Sakalabhuwaṇa Tuṣṭikāraṇa Sarwwāniwāryyawīryya Parākrama Digjayottunggadewanāma (Śrī Bameswara)	Tapan inscription, Tiru Kidul inscription, Karanggayam inscription (1112), Padlegan inscription (1117), Panumbangan inscription (1120), Geneng inscription (1128), Candi Tuban inscription (1129), Tangkilan inscription (1130), Sukorejo inscription (1131), Besole inscription (1132), Pagiliran inscription (1134), Karangrejo inscription (1134), Bameswara inscription (1135).
1135-1159	Jayabhaya	Śrī Mahārāja Sang Mapañji Jayabhaya Śrī Warmmeśwara Madhusudanāwatārānindita Suhṛtsingha Parākrama Digjayottunggadewanāma (Śrī Warmmeswara)	Mentioned in the Kakawin Bhāratayuddha, Hantang inscription (1135), Talan inscription (1136) and Jepun inscription (1144). Janggala was conquered and reunited with Panjalu.
1159-1169		Śrī Mahārāja Rakai Sirikan Śrī Sarweśwara Janardanawatāra Wijayā Agrajaśāmā Śiṇghadāṇi Wāryyawiryya Parākrama Digjayottunggadewanāma (Śrī Sarweswara)	Mentioned in the inscription of Padlegan II (1159), Kahyunan (1161) and Wajak I (1164).
1169-1180		Śrī Mahārāja Rakai Hino Śrī Aryyeśwara Madhusudanāwatārārijayamukha Sakalabhuwaṇa Tuṣṭikāraṇaniwāryyawīryya Parâkramottunggadewanāma (Śrī Aryyeswara)	Mentioned in the inscription of Mleri (1169) and Angin (1171).
1180-1182	Kroñcāryadipa	Śrī Mahārāja Śrī Kroñcāryadipa Haṇḍabhuwanamalaka Parākramanindita Digjayottunggadewanāma Śrī Gandra (Śrī Gandra)	Mentioned in the inscription of Manggar (1180) and Jaring inscription (1181).
1182-1194		Pāduka Śri Mahārāja Śri Kāmeśwara Triwikramāwatāra Aniwāryyawiryya Parākrama Digjayottunggadewanāma (Śrī Kameswara)	Mentioned in the inscription of Semanding (1182), Ranu Kumbolo (1182), Ceker inscription (1185).
1194-1222	Kṛtajaya/Śṛṅga	Pāduka Śrī Mahārāja Śrī Sarwweśwara Triwikramāwatārānindita Parākrama Śṛṅgalāncana Digjayottunggadewanāma (Śrī Sarwweswara )	Mentioned in the Sapu Angin inscription (1190), Tesirejo (1191), Kamulan (1194), Palah (1197), Mleri II (1198), Galunggung (1201), Biri (1202), Tuliskriyo (1202), Sumberingin (1204), Lawadan (1205), Cemandi (1205), Merjosari (1216), Nagarakretagama (1365) and Pararaton. Died in 1144 Saka (1222).
Jayakatwang's rebellion from Gelang-gelang or Gegelang which revived the short-lived second dynasty of Kadiri.
1292-1293	Jayakatyêng	Śrī Jayakatyêng (Jayakatwang)	Mentioned in the inscription of Mula Malurung (1255), Kudadu inscription (1294), Nagarakretagama (1365) and Pararaton.

== See also ==
- List of monarchs of Java
