= Janggala =

11th and 12th century Javanese Kingdom

- 1045–1136
- Janggala and Panjalu (Kediri) kingdom, later unified as Kediri kingdom
- Capital: Hujung Galuh (Surabaya)
- Common languages: Old Javanese, Sanskrit
- Religion: Kejawen, Hinduism, Buddhism, Animism
- Government: Monarchy
- Raja
  - 1042 - 1052: Mapanji Garasakan
  - 1052 - 1059: Alanjung Ahyes
  - 1059 - ?: Samarotsaha
- History
  - Airlangga divided his kingdom into Janggala and Panjalu (Kediri): 1045
  - Kameswara of Kadiri married a princess of the Kingdom of Janggala, uniting the two: 1136
- Currency: Native gold and silver coins
Preceded by	Succeeded by
Kahuripan	Kediri (historical kingdom)

The Kingdom of Janggala is one of the two Javanese kingdoms that was formed when Airlangga abdicated his throne in favour of his two sons in 1045. The other Kingdom was Kediri. The Kingdom of Janggala comprised the northeastern part of the Kingdom of Kahuripan.

== Etymology ==
The name Janggala was probably originated from the name "Hujung Galuh" (Old Javanese lit: "Cape Diamond" or "Cape Gemstone"), or "Jung-ya-lu", according to Chinese source.

Hujung Galuh located on the estuarine of Brantas river and today is the part of modern Surabaya city. This city served as an important port since the era of Kahuripan, Janggala, until the era of Kediri, Singhasari, and Majapahit. During Singhasari and Majapahit period the name of the port is changed back to Hujung Galuh.

The name Janggala has accidental similarity with Sanskrit: जङ्गल, romanized: jaṅgala, lit. 'an area sparingly grown with trees and plants' and Old Javanese: jaṅgala, lit. 'uncultivated land, wilderness'.

== Overview ==
Not much is known about the Kingdom of Janggala because the Kingdom of Kediri was the more dominant of the two. Janggala and Kediri were again united when the raja of Kadiri, Kameswara (1116–1136) married a princess of the Kingdom of Janggala, at which point the Kingdom of Janggala ceased to exist.

== Kadiri and Janggala ==
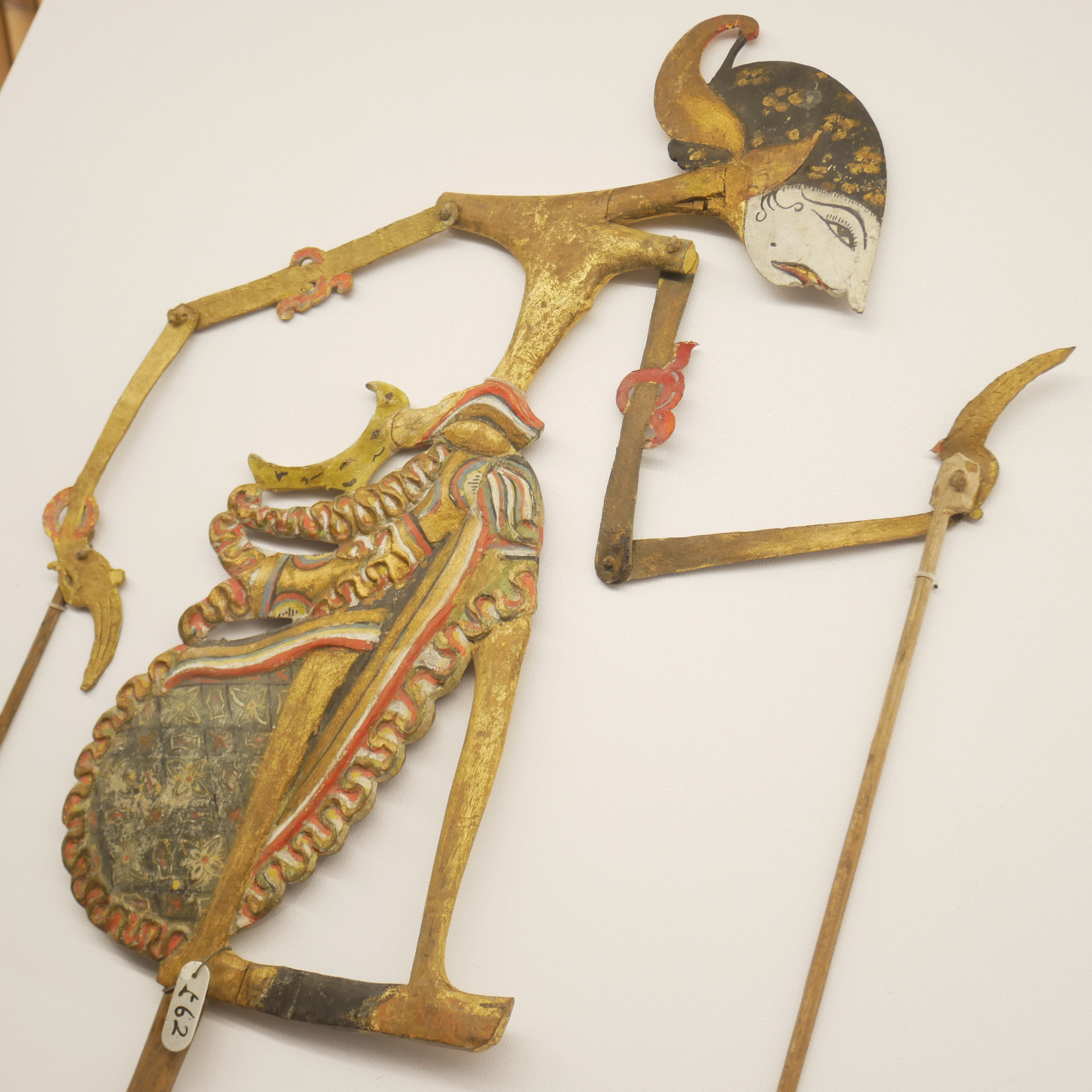
Wayang Kulit puppet of Panji Inu Kertapati―the prince of Janggala Kingdom—is noted for his exceedingly good looks and strong character.

Airlangga was the last great king of the Mataram kingdom of Java. At the end of his life he decided to divide his kingdom between his two sons which was Kadiri and Djanggala. "After establishing his kingdom between his two sons and he himself retired to life of monastic contemplation." Here we learn that Airlangga even before he died handed over his kingdom to retire to his own personal thought and meditation. This of course seems to be like what we in the world today do with our families in handing over our business to our younger sons in order for us to retire and live in relaxation. In this division Colin Brown writes in the book, A Short History of Indonesia, "The western portion of Mataram became Kadiri, the eastern part Janggala." A century later Kadiri took over the eastern Janggala empire under the command of Jayabaya in 1135-1157. As well as Janggala Kadiri also took control of Bali and Kalimantan.

Another account of Kadiri is by the author previously mentioned by J. D. Legge. He states that, "The successor kingdoms of Kadiri and Djanggala were in due course reunited under Ken Angrok who had usurped the throne of Djanggala and who founded the dynasty of Singhosari."

Putting this all together Kadiri, According to Brown, collapsed in 1222 defeated by the state of Tumapel in the Brantas River valley in the Malang region under the command of previously mentioned Ken Angrok. With this information we can state that Kadiri took over Djanggala and succeeded in ruling for a time until the coming of their neighbour Ken Angrok who took Kadiri over and assimilated into his domain.

== See also ==
- List of monarchs of Java
