= Kertajaya =

Sri Maharaja Sri Sarweswara Triwikramawatara Anindita Srenggalancana Digjaya Uttunggadewa

King of Kediri
- Reign: 1194 – 1222
- Successor: Jayakatwang
- Born: East Java
- Died: c. 1222; Ganter, East Kediri, Kediri District, East Java, Indonesia
- Issue: Jayasabha
Names
- Kertajaya/Srengga
Regnal name
- Pāduka Śrī Mahārāja Śrī Sarwweśwara Triwikramāwatārānindita Parākrama Śṛṅgalāncana Digjayottunggadewanāma
- Dynasty: Isyana dynasty
- Religion: Hindu

Kertajaya or Srengga also called Dandhang Gendhis was the last king of the Kediri Kingdom who ruled around 1194–1222. At the end of his reign he declared that he wanted to be worshiped as a god. Kertajaya was killed by Ken Arok from Tumapel or Singhasari, which ended the period of the Kediri Kingdom.

== Ken Arok's Rebellion ==
In Pararaton Maharaja Kertajaya is called by the name Prabu Dandhang Gendis. It is said that at the end of his reign the stability of the Kediri Kingdom began to decline. This condition was because the king intended to reduce the rights of the Brahmins. The king said he wanted to be worshiped as a god. The request of Prabu Dandhang Gendis certainly met resistance from the priests and the Hindu and Buddhist priests and Brahmins. Although Prabu Dandhang Gendis showed his magic by sitting cross-legged on a sharp spear that stood up. Some people who did not recognize Kertajaya's divinity had to be cruelly tortured to death. Meanwhile, those who acknowledge their divinity will be freed from all punishments and given an honorable position. The Brahmins and the priests who were afraid of them chose to flee, and because of his ethics and greed, Kertajaya continued to be rejected by the Brahmins. The Brahmins chose to leave the capital Kingdom of Kediri. They left while continuing to tell Kertajaya's error to all the people of the kingdom they met. The Brahmins and priests asked for protection from the Tumapel area (Malang) under the leadership of Ken Arok. they chose to take refuge in Ken Arok, a subordinate of Dandhang Gendis who became an akuwu (currently a camat level position) in the Tumapel area. Ken Arok then made himself king and declared the Tumapel region as an independent kingdom, separated from Kediri.

Knowing this, Kertajaya then prepared troops to attack Tumapel. Dandhang Gendis was not afraid at all. He claimed that he could only be defeated by Shiva. Hearing this, Ken Arok took the title Bhatara Guru (another name Shiva) and moved to lead the troops to attack Kediri.

== Ganter Battle ==
Ken Arok with the support of the Brahmins carried out an attack on the Kediri Kingdom. The two armies had met near the village of Ganter, east of Kadiri. The war between Tumapel and Kediri was fierce near the Ganter village area. The warlords Kadiri namely Mahisa Walungan (Dandhang Gendis' sister) and Gubar Baleman died at the hands of Ken Arok. Dandhang Gendis himself fled and hid up into heaven. Nagarakretagama also briefly recounted the news of Kertajaya's defeat. It is said that Kertajaya fled and hid in the dewalaya (the realm of the gods). The two texts report that Kertajaya's escape place is the realm of the gods. The possibility is that Kertajaya was hiding in a worship temple, or Kertajaya died and went to the realm of the gods.
