= Brantas River =

River in East Java in Indonesia

Coordinates: 7.4599°S 112.4302°E

Brantas River Kali Brantas, Sungai Brantas
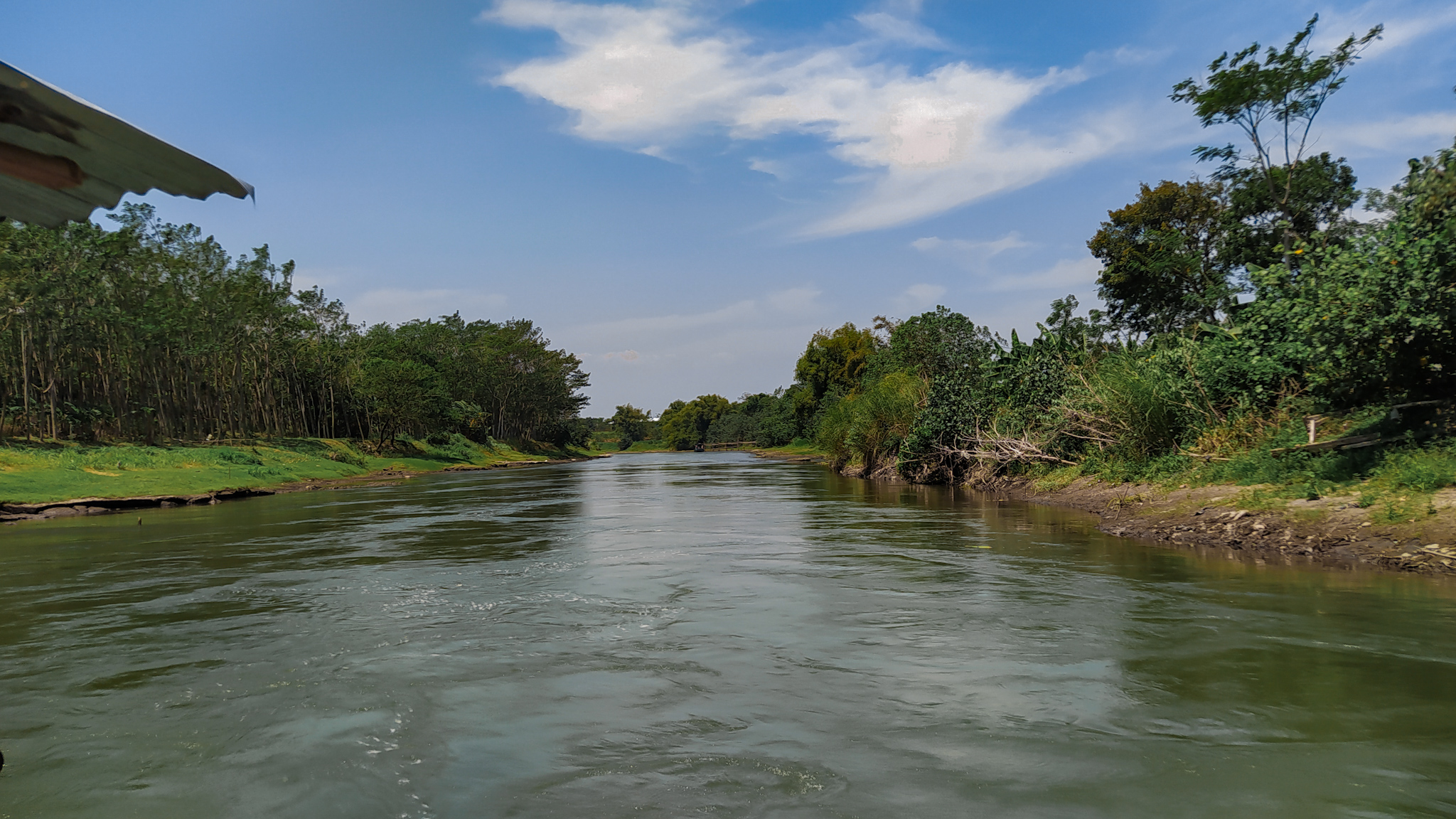
- Brantas river, Kediri regency.

- Location of river mouth Brantas River (Indonesia)

Location
- Country: Indonesia
- Province: East Java

Physical characteristics
- Source: Arjuno-Welirang
- Mouth
  - location: Madura Strait
- Length: 320 km (200 mi)
- Basin size: 11,900 km^{2} (4,600 mi^{2})
- Discharge
  - location: Near mouth
  - average: 579 m^{3}/s (20,400 cu ft/s)

Basin features
- River system: Brantas Basin (DAS220228)

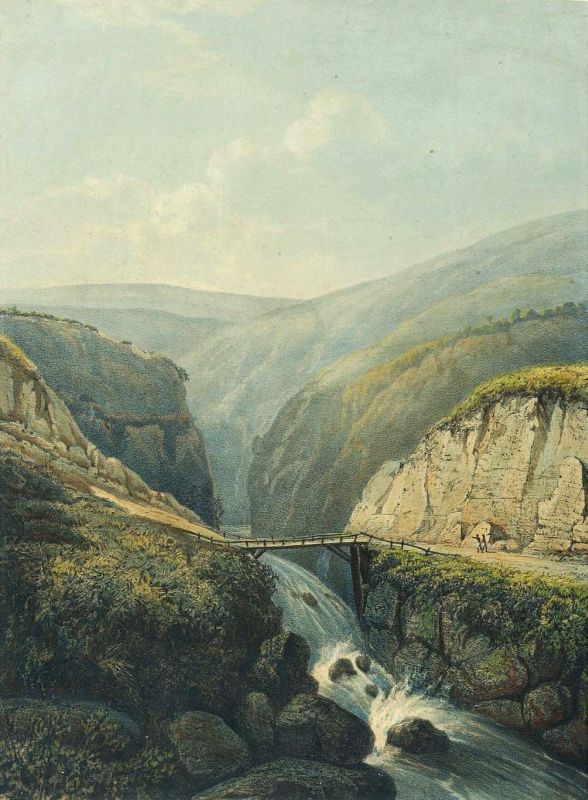
Lithography of Brantas river based on the painting by Abraham Salm (1865-1872)

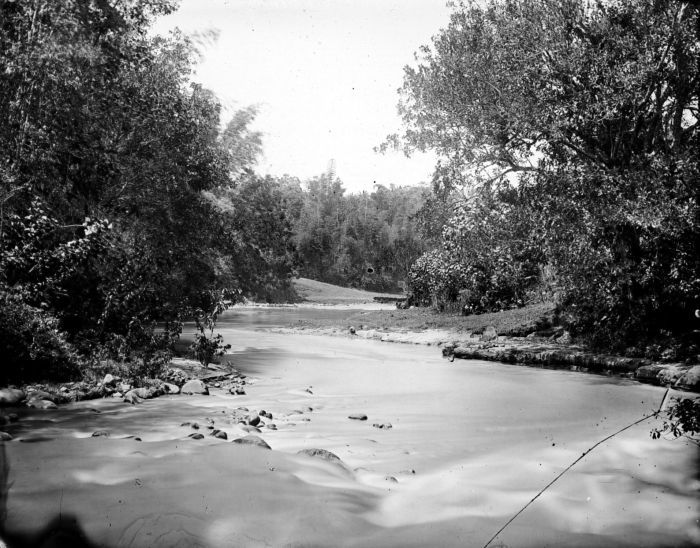
Brantas river before 1940

The Brantas is the longest river in East Java, Indonesia. It has a length of 320 km, and drains an area of over 11,000 km^{2} from the southern slope of Mount Kawi-Kelud-Butak, Mount Wilis, and the northern slopes of Mount Liman-Limas, Mount Welirang, and Mount Anjasmoro. Its course is semi-circular or spiral in shape: at its source, the river heads southeast, but gradually curves south, then southwest, west, then north, and finally it flows generally eastward at the point where it branches off to become the Kalimas and Porong River.

== History ==
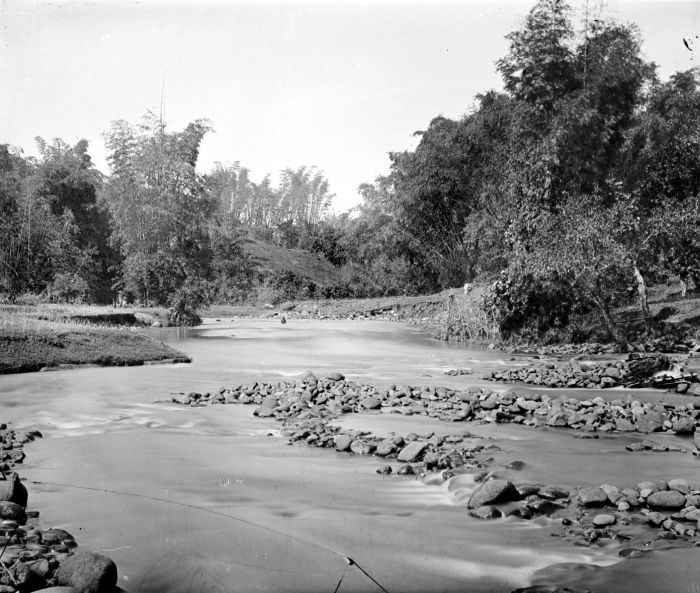
Brantas River in the area of Surabaya, early 20th century

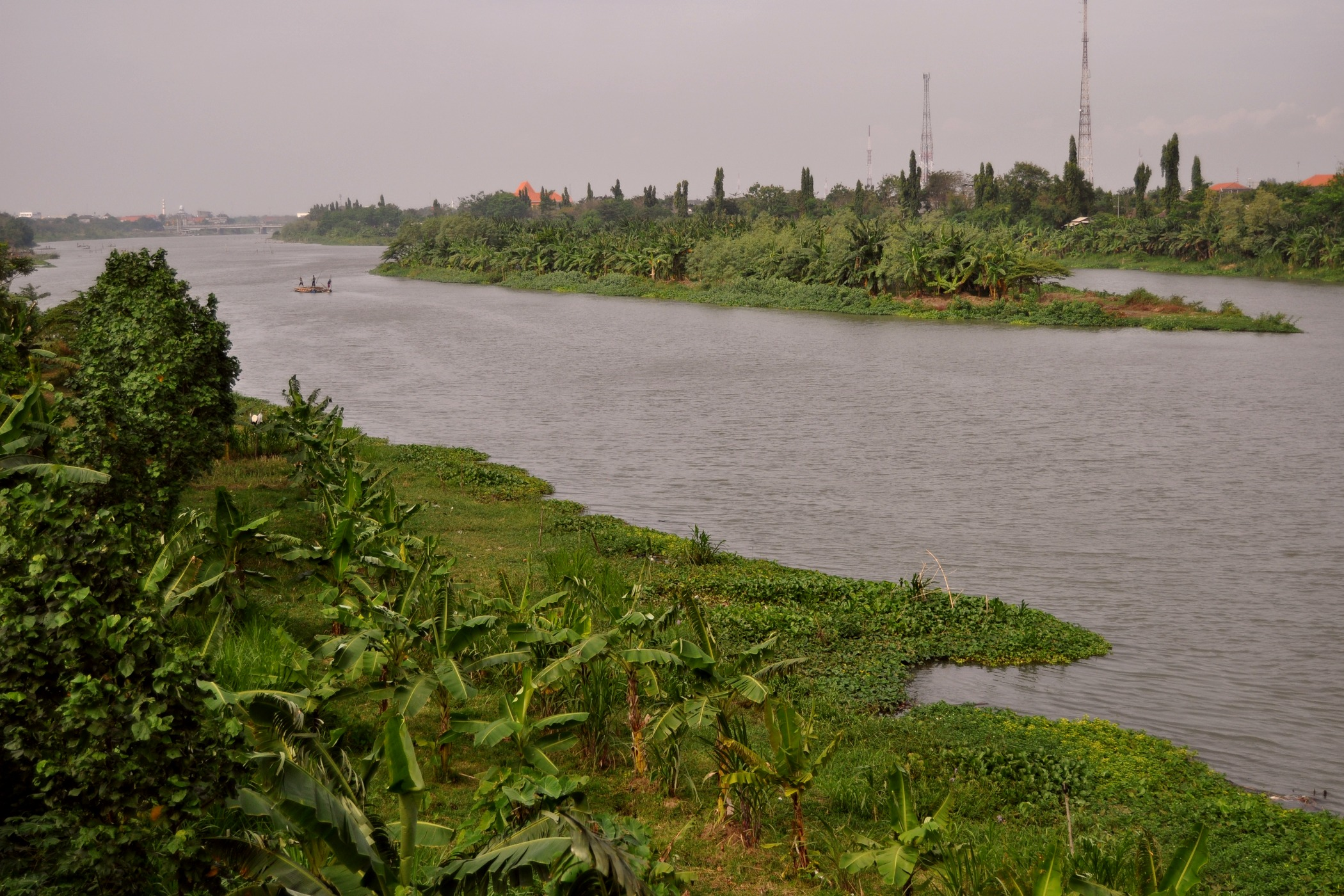
Shallow Brantas river near Kediri.

King Mpu Sindok moved his kingdom from the Mataram kingdom in Central Java to a new location on this river circa 950 A.D. Possibly (only one of several reasons given) due to a Mount Merapi volcanic eruption, he had to leave his kingdom to this new safe place near the present city of Madiun.

== Cities and regencies on the Brantas River ==
- Batu
- Malang Regency
- Malang
- Blitar Regency
- Blitar
- Tulungagung Regency
- Kediri Regency
- Kediri
- Nganjuk Regency
- Jombang Regency
- Mojokerto Regency
- Mojokerto

== Geography ==
The river flows in the eastern area of Java with a predominantly tropical monsoon climate (designated as Am in the Köppen-Geiger climate classification). The annual average temperature in the area is 26 °C. The warmest month is October when the average temperature is around 30 °C, and the coldest is June, at 24 °C on average. The average annual rainfall is 2982 mm. The wettest month is March, with an average of 496 mm of rainfall, and the driest is August, with 28 mm of rainfall.

Brantas River

Climate chart (precipitation, max. and min. temperature)
J	F	M	A	M	J	J	A	S	O	N	D
459 28 21	453 27 22	496 27 21	282 28 22	144 29 22	175 27 20	65 29 20	28 32 20	35 35 21	111 37 22	295 35 23	439 30 21
- █ Average max. and min. temperatures in °C
- █ Precipitation totals in mm
Imperial conversion
J	F	M	A	M	J	J	A	S	O	N	D
18 82 70	18 81 72	20 81 70	11 82 72	5.7 84 72	6.9 81 68	2.6 84 68	1.1 90 68	1.4 95 70	4.4 99 72	12 95 73	17 86 70
- █ Average max. and min. temperatures in °F
- █ Precipitation totals in inches

== See also ==
- List of rivers of Indonesia
- List of rivers of Java
- List of drainage basins of Indonesia
