= Indonesian Esoteric Buddhism =

Esoteric Buddhism found in Maritime Southeast Asia

Indonesian Esoteric Buddhism was the tradition of Esoteric Buddhism found in Maritime Southeast Asia which emerged in the 7th century along the maritime trade routes and port cities of the Indonesian islands of Java and Sumatra as well as in the Malay Peninsula. These esoteric forms were spread by Pilgrims and Tantric masters who received royal patronage from royal dynasties like the Sailendras and the Srivijaya. This tradition was also linked by the maritime trade routes with Indian Vajrayana, Tantric Buddhism in Sinhala, Cham and Khmer lands and in China and Japan, to the extent that it is hard to separate them completely and it is better to speak of a complex of "Esoteric Buddhism of Mediaeval Maritime Asia." Many key Indian port cities saw the growth of Esoteric Buddhism, a tradition which coexisted alongside Shaivism.

Java under the Sailendras became a major center of Buddhism in the region, with monumental architecture such as Borobudur and Candi Sukuh. The capital of the Buddhist empire of Srivijaya in Palembang, Sumatra was another major center.

The decline of Buddhist states and the rise of Islamic states in the region during the 13th–16th centuries saw the gradual decline of this tradition.

== History ==
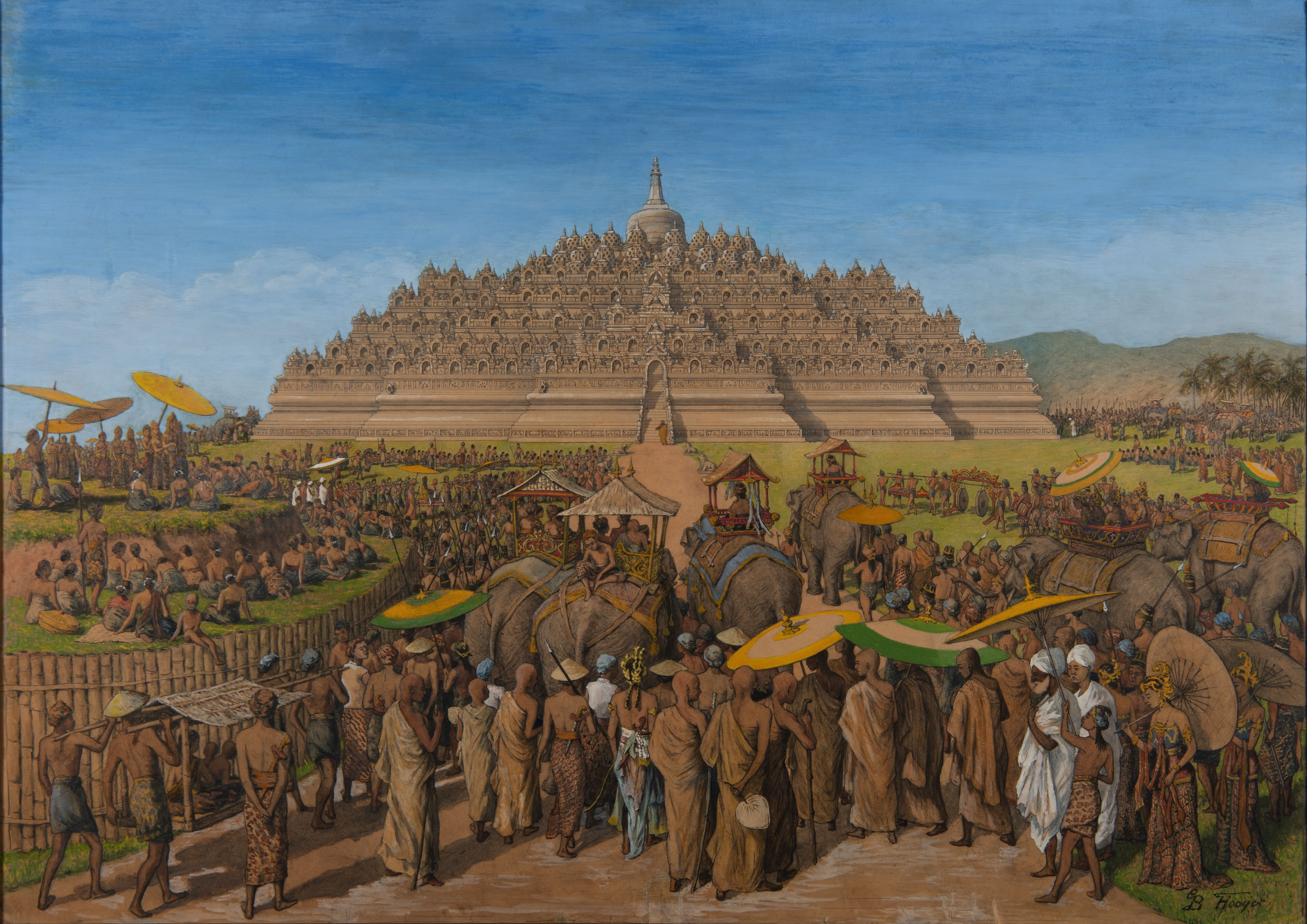
A painting by G.B. Hooijer (c. 1916–1919) reconstructing the scene of Borobudur during its heyday

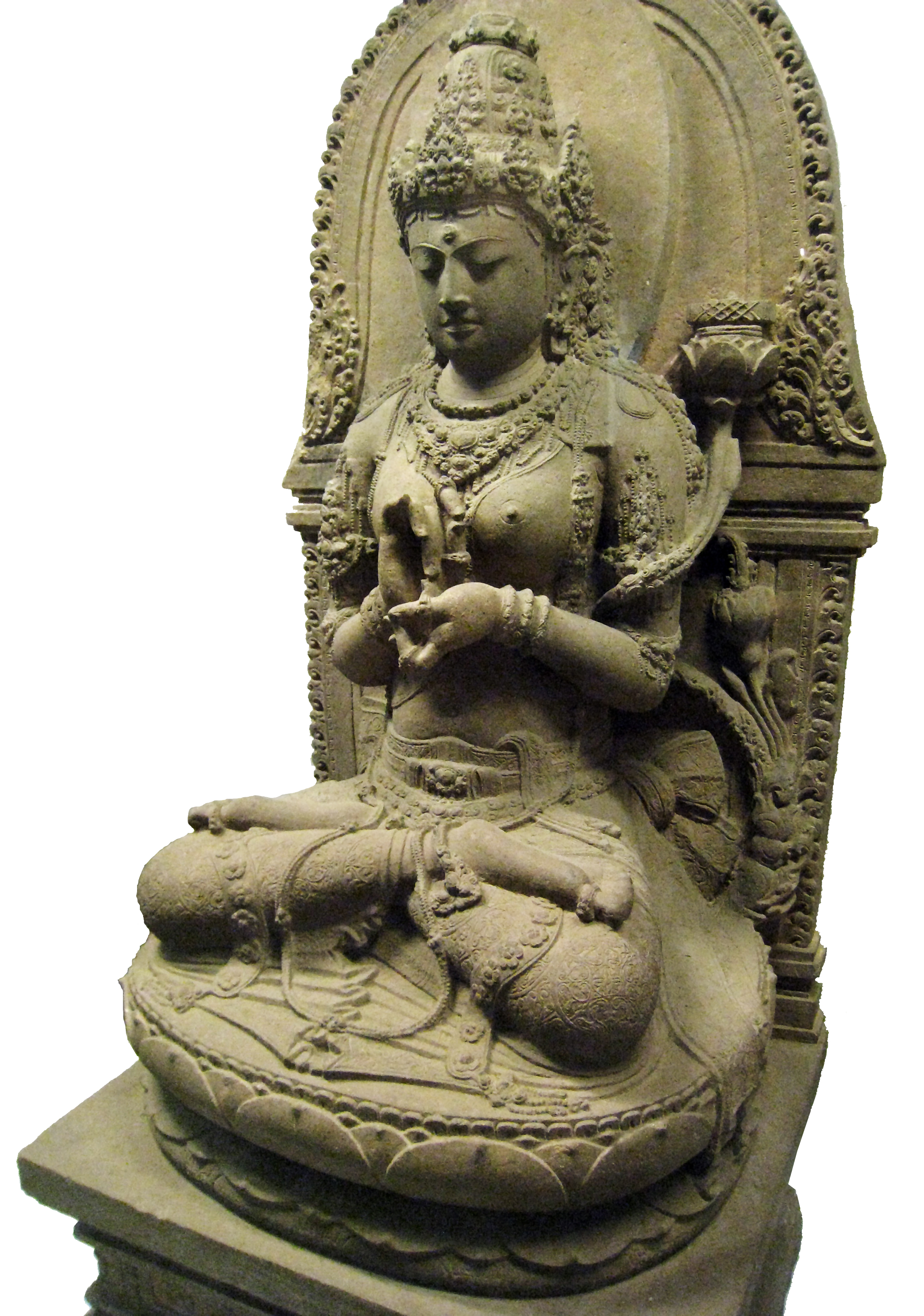
13th century Javanese statue of Prajnaparamita, from the Cungkup Putri ruins near Singhasari temple

The diffusion of Esoteric Buddhism in the region began with the arrival of Indian Buddhist monks in the 7th century. These include the central Indian Atikuta (fl. 650s), the Chinese Punyodaya (fl 650s), Yijing (635-713), the South Indian Dharmaruci/Bodhiruci (d. 727), Nagabodhi, Vajrabodhi and Bianhong (the 8th-century teacher of Kukai). The Chinese Buddhist monk Yijing reports that in the 7th century, there was a Buddhist center in Java named Kalinga (Heling) to which Chinese monks traveled to study.

Another source of this Indonesian Tantric tradition was Sri Lanka's Abhayagiri vihāra, a well-known center of Vajrayana study and practice, which even established a branch monastery in Central Java in the 8th century with Sailendra patronage.

A stronghold of Esoteric Buddhism, the empire of Srivijaya (650 CE–1377 CE) patronized Buddhist monks and institutions and thus attracted pilgrims and scholars from other parts of Asia. These included the Chinese monk Yijing, who made several lengthy visits to Sumatra on his way to study at Nalanda University in India in 671 and 695, and the Bengali Buddhist scholar Atisha (982-1054 CE) who played a major role in the development of Vajrayana Buddhism in Tibet. Yijing praised the high level of Buddhist scholarship in Srivijaya and advised Chinese monks to study there before making the journey to the great institution of learning, Nalanda Vihara, India. He wrote:

In the fortified city of Bhoga, Buddhist priests number more than 1,000, whose minds are bent on learning and good practice. They investigate and study all the subjects that exist just as in India; the rules and ceremonies are not at all different. If a Chinese priest wishes to go to the West in order to hear and read the original scriptures, he had better stay here one or two years and practice the proper rules.

Yijing was also responsible for the translation of a large number of Buddhist scriptures from Sanskrit into Chinese. He translated more than 60 sutras into Chinese such as the Golden Light Sutra. The Account of Buddhism sent from the South Seas & Buddhist Monks Pilgrimage of Tang Dynasty are two of Yi Jing's best travel diaries, describing his adventurous journey to Srivijaya and India, the society of India and the lifestyles of various local peoples.

In Java, the 8th century Shailendra dynasty promoted large-scale Buddhist building projects such as Borobudur. Later central Javanese bronze and silver Buddhist images show Tantric themes such as mandalas and the Five Tathagatas.

In the 13th century Buddhism thrived in Eastern Java, the Singhasari kingdom of King Kertanegara of Singhasari patronized Vajrayana. Buddhism continued to thrive under the Hindu-Buddhist Majapahit Empire (1293–1527). Their capital Trowulan had many annual festivities for Buddhism, Shaivism, and Vaishnavism. Some of their kings were Vajrayana practitioners, such as King Adityawarman (1347–79) whose inscriptions state he was "always concentrated on Hevajra". A feature of Javanese Buddhism was the deification and worship of kings as Buddhas or Bodhisattvas. Important Buddhist deities included Prajnaparamita, Tara, Bhairava and Lokesvara.

The fall of Majapahit and the rise of Muslim states such as the Sultanate of Malacca saw the decline of Buddhism in the region. Some escaped to the island of Bali after the end of Majapahit rule, fleeing political persecution, where Buddhism was merged into Balinese Hinduism. This process of merging Buddhism and Hinduism predated the fall of the Majapahit however, and many textual sources from the later Hindu-Buddhist kingdom state that Hinduism and Buddhism are both two paths to the same reality and also equate the five Buddhas with five forms of Shiva. Likewise, some Majapahit temples depict both Buddhist and Shaiva elements.

Traces of esoteric Buddhism exist in Bali, including stupa votives and several religious rituals.

== Literature ==
The oldest extant esoteric Buddhist Mantrayana literature in Old Javanese, an Austronesian language significantly influenced by Sanskrit, is enshrined in the San Hyan Kamahayanikan (possibly 8th century). The San Hyan Kamahayanikan claims that its teachings come from the Indian philosopher Dignāga.

The Tibetan Buddhist canon includes translations of texts written by Javanese masters, such as the Durbodhaloka (a commentary on the Abhisamayalamkara) of Suvarnadvipa Dharmakīrti.

Another work by an Indonesian Tantric Buddhist is Bianhong's Ritual Manual for Initiation into the Great Mandala of the Usnisa-Cakravartin which survives in the Chinese Taisho Tripitaka (T. 959). The Japanese master Kukai wrote a biography of Bianhong.

== Architecture ==
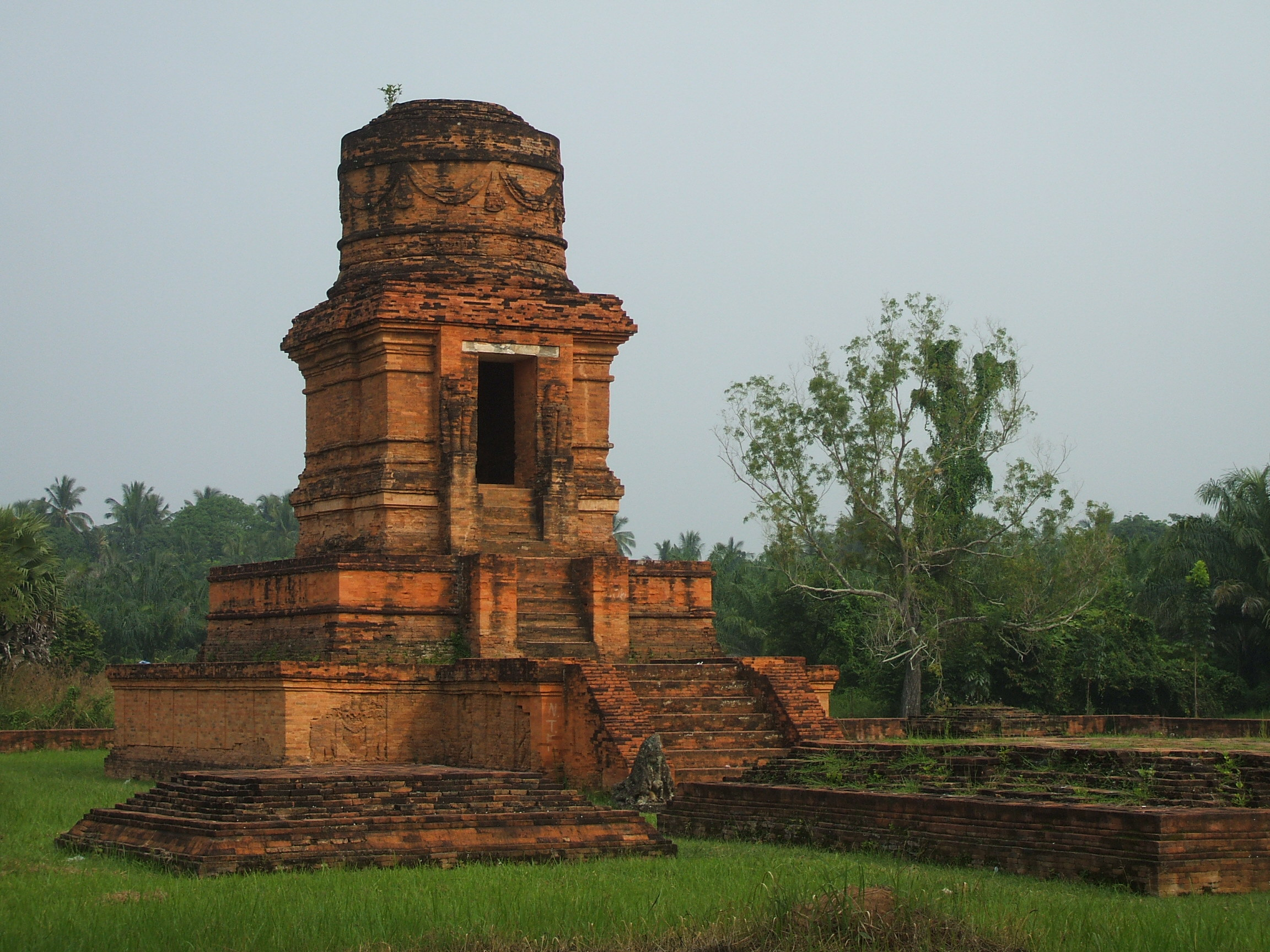
Bahal temple I, in Padang Lawas, North Sumatra. One of the remnants of Pannai Kingdom.

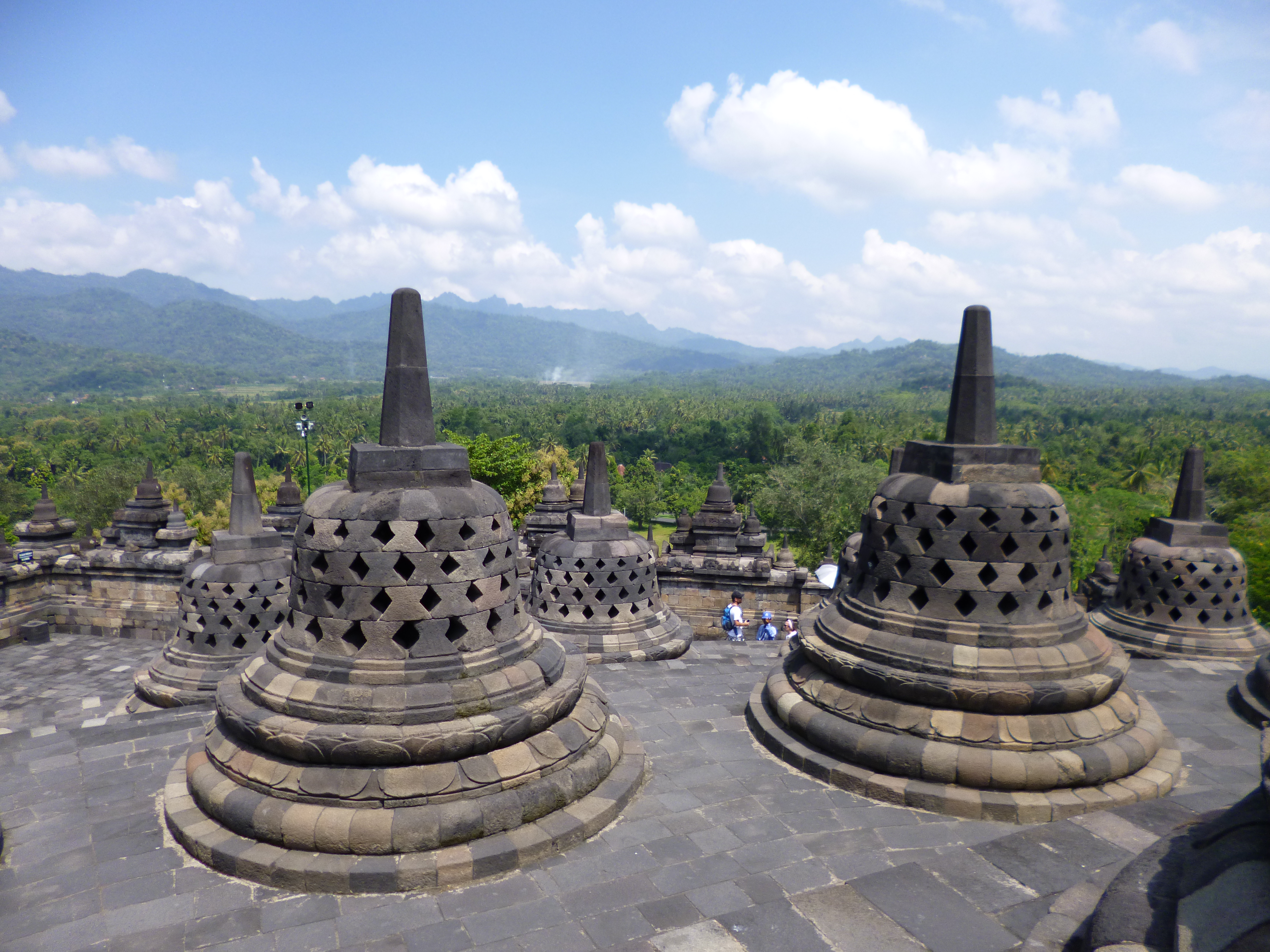
Borobudur Stupas

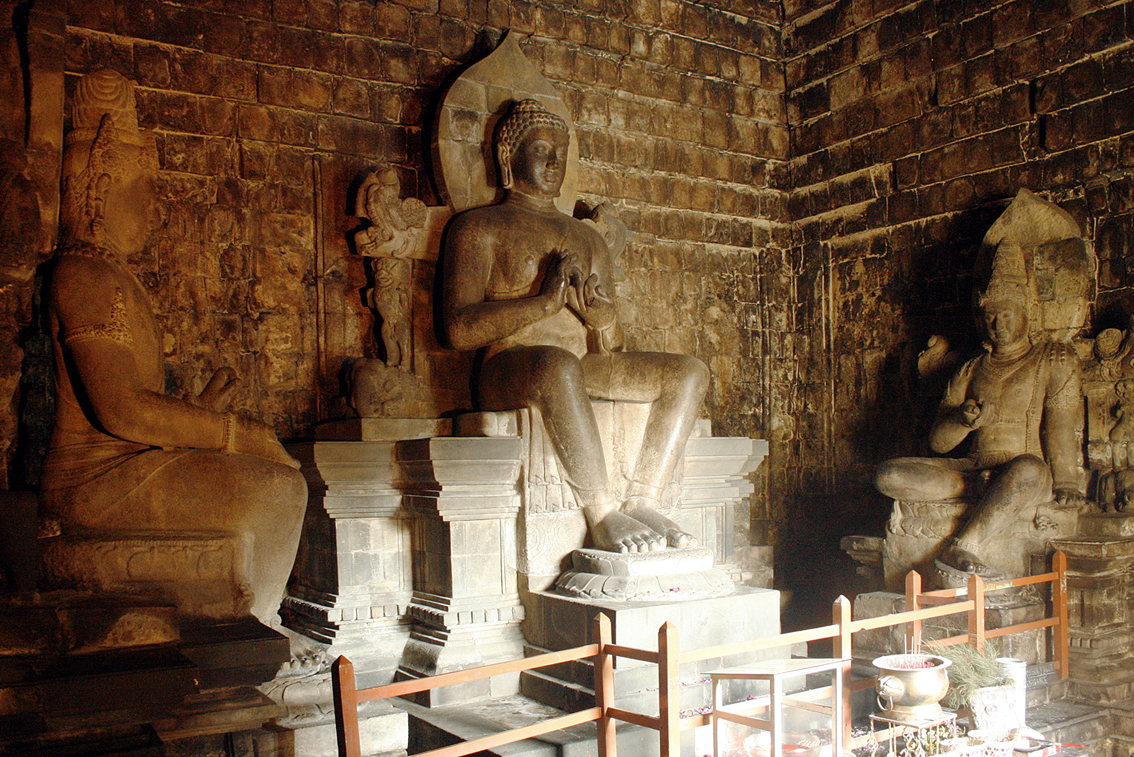
The statue of Dhyani Buddha Vairocana, Avalokitesvara, and Vajrapani inside the Mendut temple

Various unique forms of Buddhist architecture developed in Indonesia and Malaysia; the most common of which is the stone Candi which shows Indic influences as has been interpreted as a symbol of Mount Meru.

The Sailendras built many Buddhist structures in Java, including the massive stupa of Borobodur, as well as Candi Sukuh, Candi Mendut, Candi Kalasan and Candi Sewu. The Srivijayans also built Buddhist temple complexes in Sumatra, such as Muara Takus and Bahal temple and also in the Malay Peninsula, such as in their regional capital at Chaiya. Majapahit also built Candis, such as Jabung, and Penataran.

Other architecture types include punden, small terraced sanctuaries built on mountains and pertapaan, hermitages built on mountain slopes.

=== Borobodur ===
The largest Buddhist stupa in the world is the 9th-century complex at Borobudur in central Java, built as a Mandala, a giant three-dimensional representation of Esoteric Buddhist cosmology. The temple shows Indian and local influences and is decorated with 2,672 relief panels and 504 Buddha statues. The reliefs depict stories from the Lalitavistara Sutra, Jataka tales and the Gandavyuha sutra.

Borobudur was abandoned sometime in the classic period, whether caused by human activity; of war or political turmoil, or natural disasters, as it lies on a volcanic plain of Merapi and other active volcanoes in central Java. There is no mention of Borobudur in any of Majapahit sources, implying that this structure was already forgotten by the end of the classic period. A major restoration project was undertaken between 1975 and 1982 by the Indonesian government and UNESCO and the monument is now a World Heritage Site. It is the most visited tourist attraction in Indonesia and it is still used by Buddhists for pilgrimage.

=== Candi Sukuh ===
Candi Sukuh is a fifteenth-century Javanese-Hindu-Buddhist temple (candi) that demonstrates strong tantric influence. Candi Sukuh is located on the western slope of Mount Lawu (elev. 3,000 feet (910 m) above sea level) on the border between Central and East Java provinces. The monument was built around 1437, as written as a chronogram date on the western gate, meaning that the area was under the rule of the Majapahit Kingdom near its end (1293–1500). The distinctive Dancing Ganesha relief in Candi Sukuh has a similarity with the Tantric ritual found in the history of Buddhism in Tibet written by Taranatha. The Tantric ritual is associated with several figures, one of whom is described as the "King of Dogs" (Sanskrit: Kukuraja), the mahasiddha who taught his disciples by day, and by night performed Ganacakra in a burial ground or charnel ground. Importantly, Ganesha also appears in Buddhism, not only in the form of the Buddhist god Vināyaka, but also portrayed as a Hindu demon form also called Vināyaka. Ganesha's image may be found on Buddhist sculptures of the late Gupta period. As the Buddhist god Vināyaka, Ganesha is often shown dancing, a form called Nṛtta Ganapati that was popular in North India and adopted in Nepal and then into Tibet.

== See also ==
- A Record of Buddhist Practices Sent Home from the Southern Sea
- Ashin Jinarakkhita
- Buddhism in Indonesia
- Buddhism in Southeast Asia
- Buddhism in the Philippines
- Dharmarakshita
- Kakawin Sutasoma
- Lalitavistara Sūtra
- Prajnaparamita of Java
- Sanghyang Adi Buddha
- Sanghyang Kamahayanikan
- Shailendra dynasty
- Yi Jing
- Chinese Esoteric Buddhism
- Eastern esotericism
