= International university =

Higher-education institution funded by the governments of many countries

An international university is funded by the governments of many countries and thereby is controlled by the officials from the government of different countries. These universities are often formed by the regional and international organizations.

The distinction between intergovernmental and international university is similar to the one between intergovernmental organization and international organization. International is a rather open-ended term, while intergovernmental specifically refers to the fact that the participating parties or members are sovereign states and intergovernmental organizations. As a result, only intergovernmental universities are subjects of international law.

== Public international institutions ==
=== IAU designation ===
The designation "international university" (category regional/international in the 'List of Universities of the World') is applied by the International Association of Universities, whose members include:

- EUCLIDE (Pôle Universitaire EUCLIDE) - EUCLID (Euclid University)
- European University Institute
- Nalanda University
- South Asian University
- IMO International Maritime Law Institute (IMLI)
- University of the Arts Helsinki
- United Nations University
- World Maritime University
- Islamic University of Technology (IUT)

=== Other international intergovernmental universities ===
About 10 other public institutions established under international law have been identified as established under international law, for example the University for Peace (Costa Rica), Ecole Supérieure Multinationale des Télécommunications (Senegal), and the Eastern and Southern African Management Institute.

The University of the West Indies and the University of the South Pacific are particular cases. Nelson (2011) refers to them as regional universities. He notes that there is no main campus and that several national entities fund and own the institutions. Ali (2012) suggests that these two institutions are not international per se, as they are both creations of the British Crown and not subject to international law.

== Private international universities ==
Private international universities are institutions that have the expression international university in their name, or international location, of some other reason to be categorized as international in nature. Examples of private institutions using the name International University are:

- International University, Indonesia
- International University, Cambodia
- Ross University
- Webster University:
- Trinity International University- evangelically-aligned international university affiliated with Evangelical Free Church of America

Alma Mater Europaea of the European Academy of Sciences and Arts and Laureate International Universities are international private university networks.

== See also ==
- International Association of Universities
- United Nations
- Intergovernmental Organization

== Articles ==
- Regional Universities: Models for Developing Regions
- Understanding The Legal Status and Degree-Granting Authority of "Regional / International" Universities
