= ESMT =

ESMT may refer to:

- Ecole Supérieure Multinationale des Télécommunications, Senegal
- European School of Management and Technology, Germany
- Halmstad Airport (ICAO code: ESMT), Halland County, Sweden
