= Prajnaparamita of Java =

13th-century Indonesian statue

Prajñāpāramitā
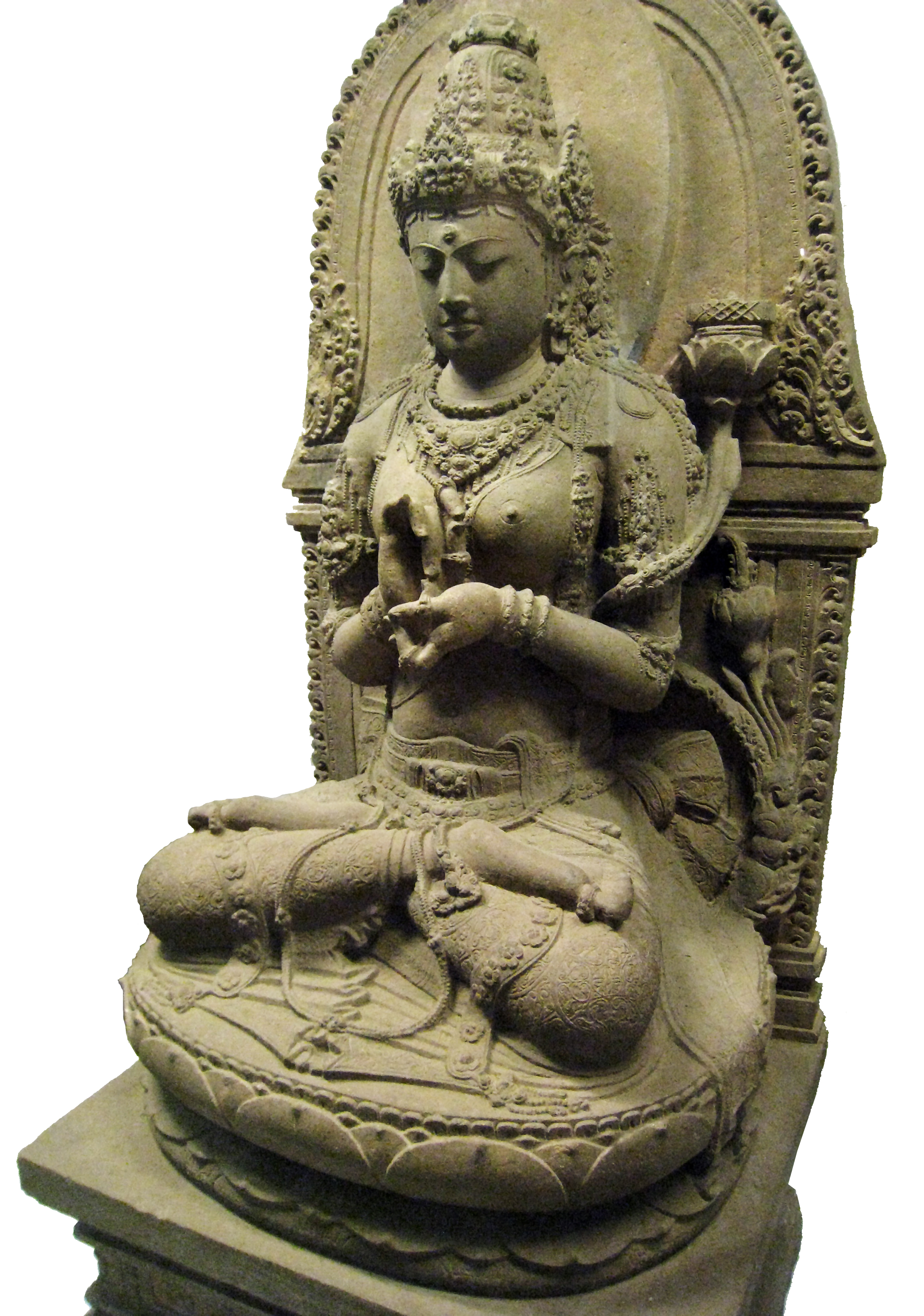
- Prajñāpāramitā statue from East Java.
- Material: Andesite stone
- Size: Height 126 cm, Width 50 cm
- Created: circa 13th century
- Discovered: Cungkup Putri, near Singhasari temple, Malang, East Java, Indonesia (1818)
- Present location: National Museum of Indonesia, Jakarta

Prajñāpāramitā of Java refers to a famous depiction of Bodhisattva Prajñāpāramitā Devi, originating from 13th century Singhasari, East Java, Indonesia. The statue is of great aesthetic and historical value, and is considered to be a masterpiece of classical Hindu-Buddhist art of ancient Java. Today, the statue is in the collection of the National Museum of Indonesia, Jakarta.

== Description ==
The statue of Prajnaparamita of East Java is probably the most famous depiction of the goddess of transcendental wisdom. The serene expression and meditative pose and gesture suggest peace and wisdom, in contrast with her rich and intricate jewelry and decorations. The goddess is in a perfect lotus meditative position called vajrasana posture, sitting on a double lotus cushion called padmasana (lotus pedestal) on top of a square base. The statue sits before a carved stela. The statue is made of light gray andesite stone measuring a height of 126 cm (50 in), width 55 cm (22 in) and thickness 55 cm (22 in).

The goddess performs dharmachakra-mudra (the mudra symbolizing turning the wheel of dharma). Her left arm is placed around an utpala (blue lotus), on top of which sits her attribute: the lontar palm leaf book Prajnaparamita Sutra. The head and face are perfectly chiseled, with downcast eyes and forehead urna. The goddess wears her hair high, arranged in a Jatamakuta crown. Behind her head radiates prabhamandala, a halo or aura of light to suggest a divinity that has reached the highest wisdom.

The statue was discovered in almost perfect condition in the Cungkup Putri ruins near Singhasari temple, Malang, East Java. Local tradition links the statue to Queen Ken Dedes the first queen of Singhasari, probably as a deified portrayal of the queen. Another opinion links the statue with Queen Gayatri Rajapatni, the consort of Kertarajasa the first king of Majapahit.

== History ==
Prajnaparamita is a goddess of high standing in Mahayana Tantric Buddhism. She is considered the shakti, or consort, of the highest Buddha in the Buddhist pantheon known as Vajradhara. She symbolises perfect knowledge.

In the 13th century, tantric Buddhism gained royal patronage of king Kertanegara of Singhasari, and thereafter some of Prajnaparamita statues were produced in the region, such as the Prajnaparamita of Singhasari in East Java and Prajnaparamita of Jambi, Sumatra. Both the East Java and Jambi Prajnaparamitas works bear resemblance in style as they were produced in same period. However, Prajnaparamita of Jambi is headless and was discovered in overall poor condition.

On the other hand, the Prajnaparamita of Singhasari was discovered in almost perfect condition. The pristine condition of the statue indicates that it was buried for quite some time. It was found near Candi E, the southernmost structure in the temple complex near Singhasari temple. The structure is called Candi Wayang or Cungkup Putri by local inhabitants.

The Prajnaparamita of Java was discovered in 1818 or 1819 by D. Monnereau, a Dutch East Indies official. In 1820 Monnereau gave the statue to C.G.C. Reinwardt, who later brought the statue to the Netherlands, where it became a prized possession of the Rijksmuseum voor Volkenkunde in Leiden. For more than 158 years the statue resided in Leiden, the Netherlands.

In January 1978, the Government of the Netherlands returned the statue to the Republic of Indonesia, when Queen Juliana of the Netherlands visited the former Dutch colony. Today, the statue is held in the National Museum of Indonesia in Jakarta. The statue is now displayed on the 4th floor of the new of Gedung Arca wing. It has become perhaps the best known icon of ancient Indonesian art, as one of the rare images that successfully combines aesthetic perfection and spirituality.

== Gallery ==
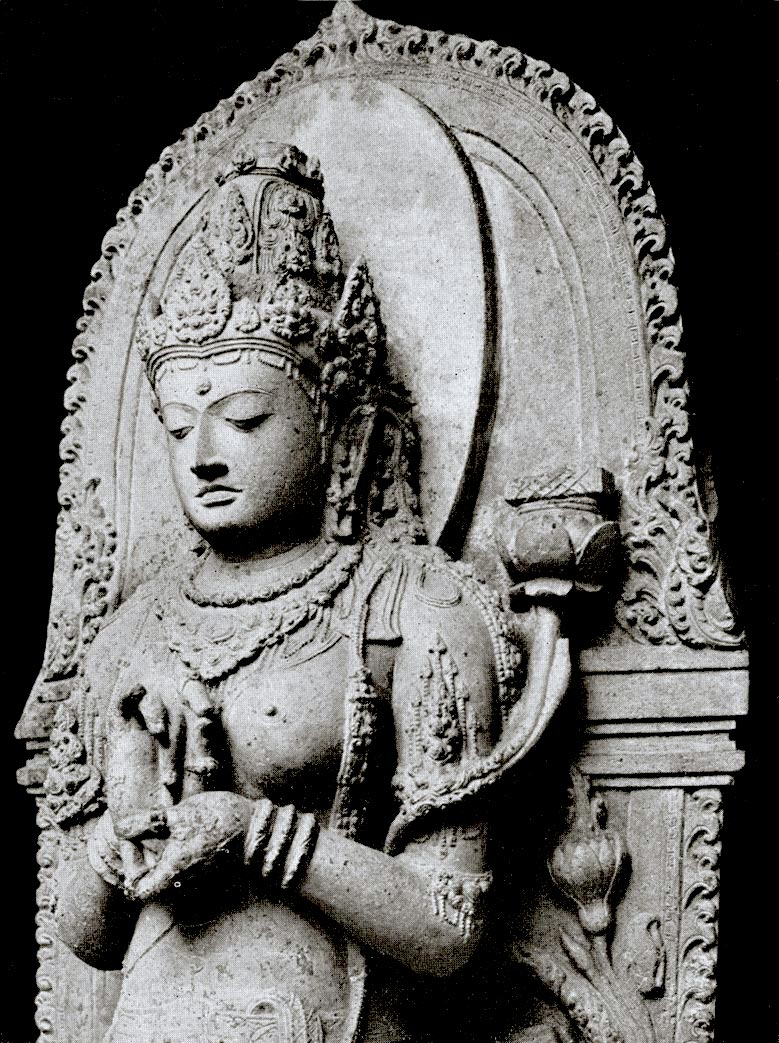
Prajñāpāramitā statue from Singhasari, East Java.

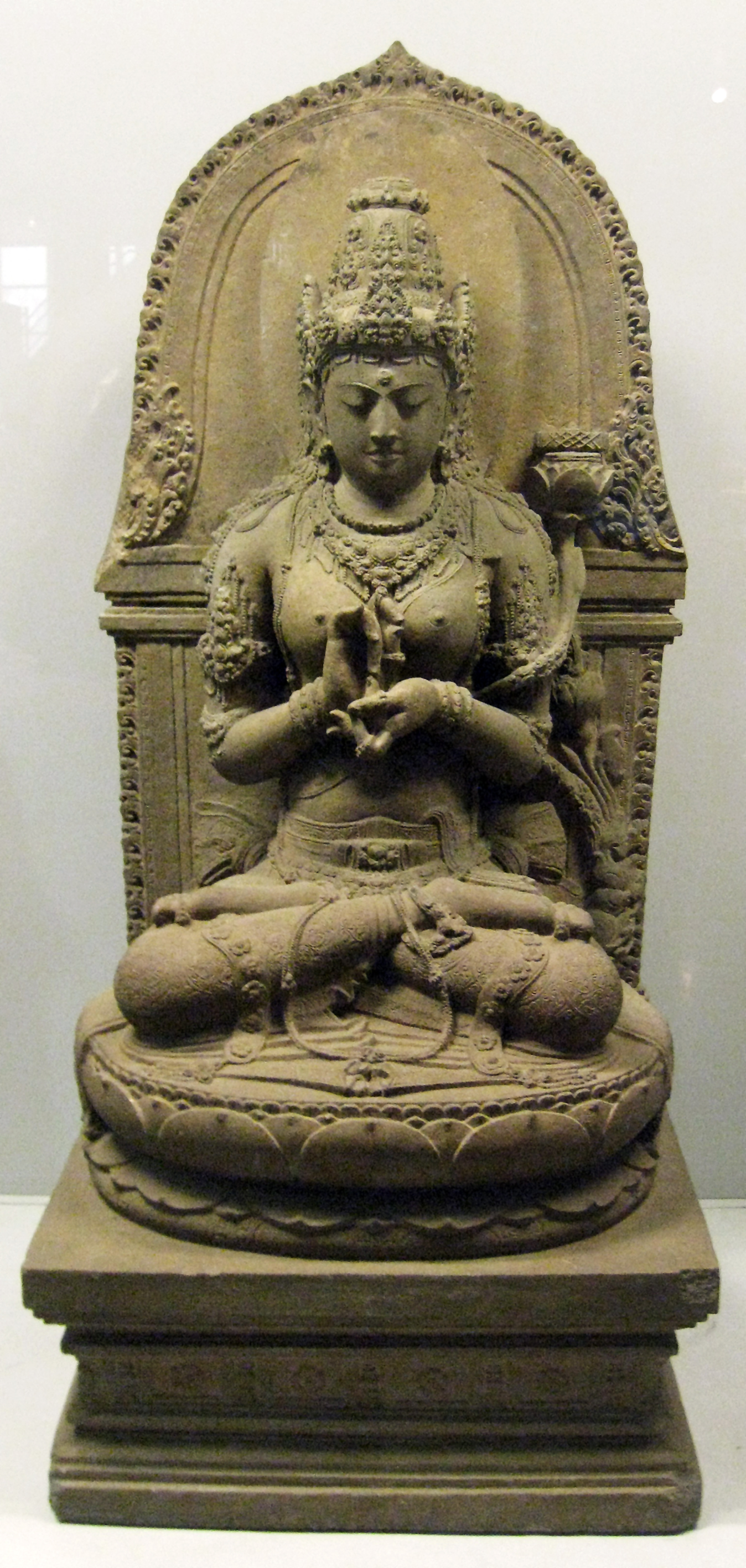
Prajñāpāramitā statue from East Java (front).

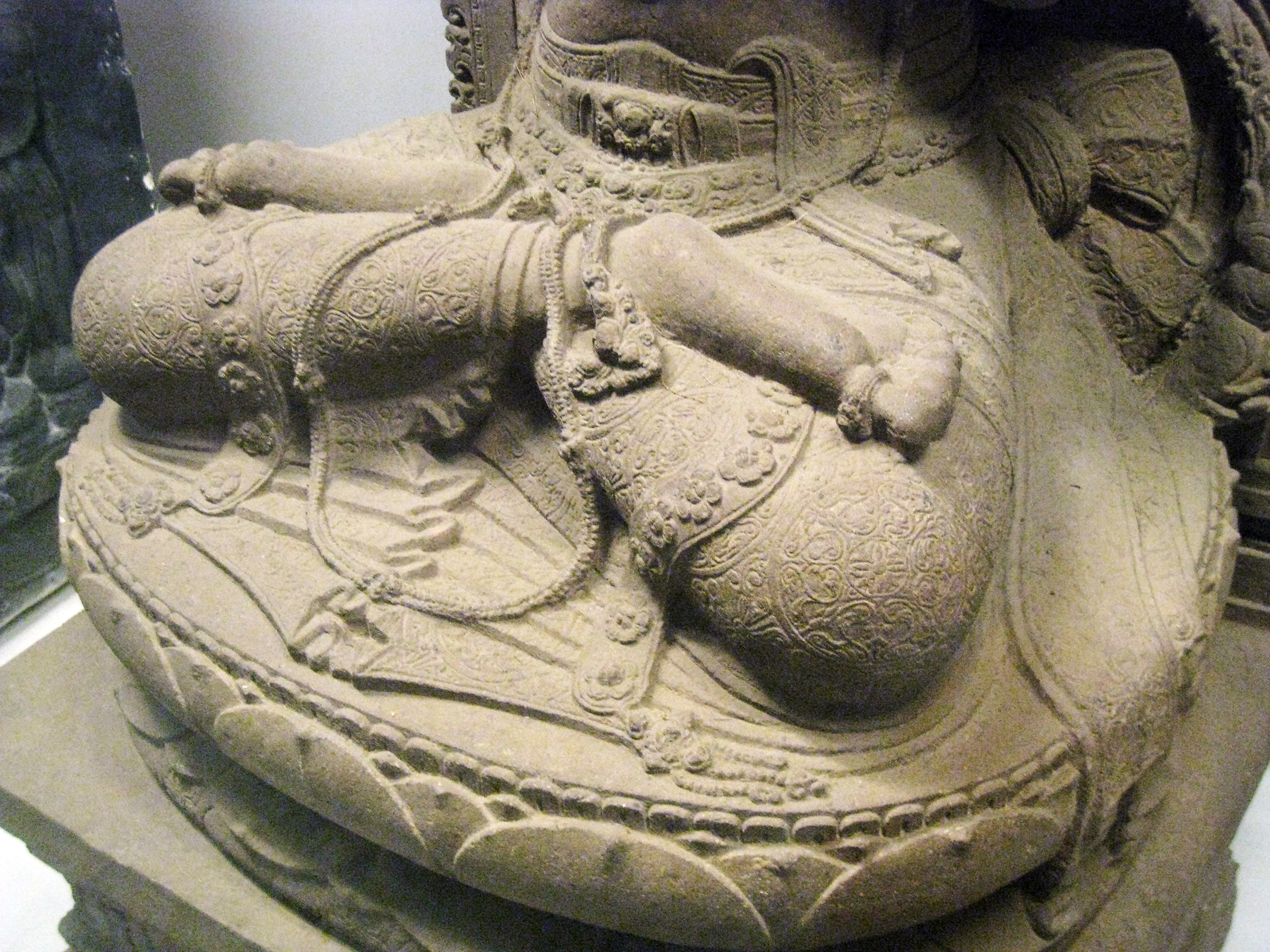
Detail of Prajñāpāramitā statue (clothing), resemble jlamprang batik motifs.

== See also ==
- Buddhist art
- Buddhism in Indonesia
- Candi of Indonesia
- Indonesian Esoteric Buddhism
