= Public Health Foundation of India =

Health agency in India

- Motto: Knowledge> Action> Impact > Equity
- Type: Public -Private Initiative
- Established: 28 March 2006
- President: Prof. Sanjay Zodpey
- Location: Unit No. 316, 3rd Floor, Rectangle -1 Building, Plot No. D-4, District Centre Saket, New Delhi-110017, New Delhi, India
- Campus: Hyderabad, Delhi, Gandhinagar, Bhubaneswar, Bengaluru, Shillong.
- Website: www.phfi.org

The Public Health Foundation of India (PHFI) is a not for profit public private initiative and deemed university in India. A national consultation, convened by the Union Ministry of Health and Family Welfare in September 2004, recommended a foundation which could rapidly advance public health education, training, research and advocacy.

The Government of India enabled the setting up of PHFI in 2006 in response to the limited public health institutional capacity and the foundation was established to strengthen training, research and policy through interdisciplinary and health system connected education and, policy programme relevant research, evidence based & equity promoting policy development, affordable health technologies, people empowering health promotion & advocacy for prioritised health causes in the field of public health.

== FCRA challenges ==
PHFI lost its FCRA status in 2017 for lobbying against tobacco activities and was banned from receiving foreign funds. This was restored in 2022.

== Indian Institutes of Public Health ==
PHFI has established five Indian Institutes of Public Health (IIPHs) in Bhubaneswar, Delhi, Gandhinagar, Hyderabad and Shillong. The institutes are aimed at being research and education institutes focusing on public health.

In 2015 Indian Institute of Public Health, Gandhinagar was the first IIPH to be granted autonomous university status through The Indian Institute of Public Health Gandhinagar Act, 2015 laid out by the State Government of Gujarat.

== Centres of Excellence ==
The PHFI has established following Centres of Excellence to advance research, training and education in key public health domains in India.

- Centre for Chronic Conditions & Injuries (CCCI)
- Centre for Environmental Health (CEH)
- Injury Prevention Research Centre
- ICMR-Collaborating Centre of Excellence (ICMR-CCoE)
- JSW Centre for Climate Change and Health (JSW CCCH)
- Center for Developmental and Lifecourse Research (CDLR)
- Ramalingaswami Centre for Social determinants of Health
