= Singhasari temple =

Hindu-Buddhist Temple in Indonesia

Coordinates: 7°53′16″S 112°39′50″E

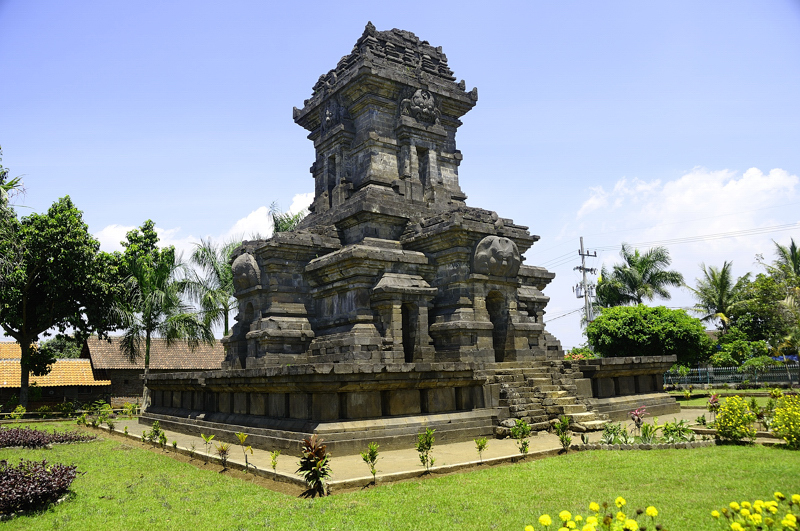
Singhasari Temple

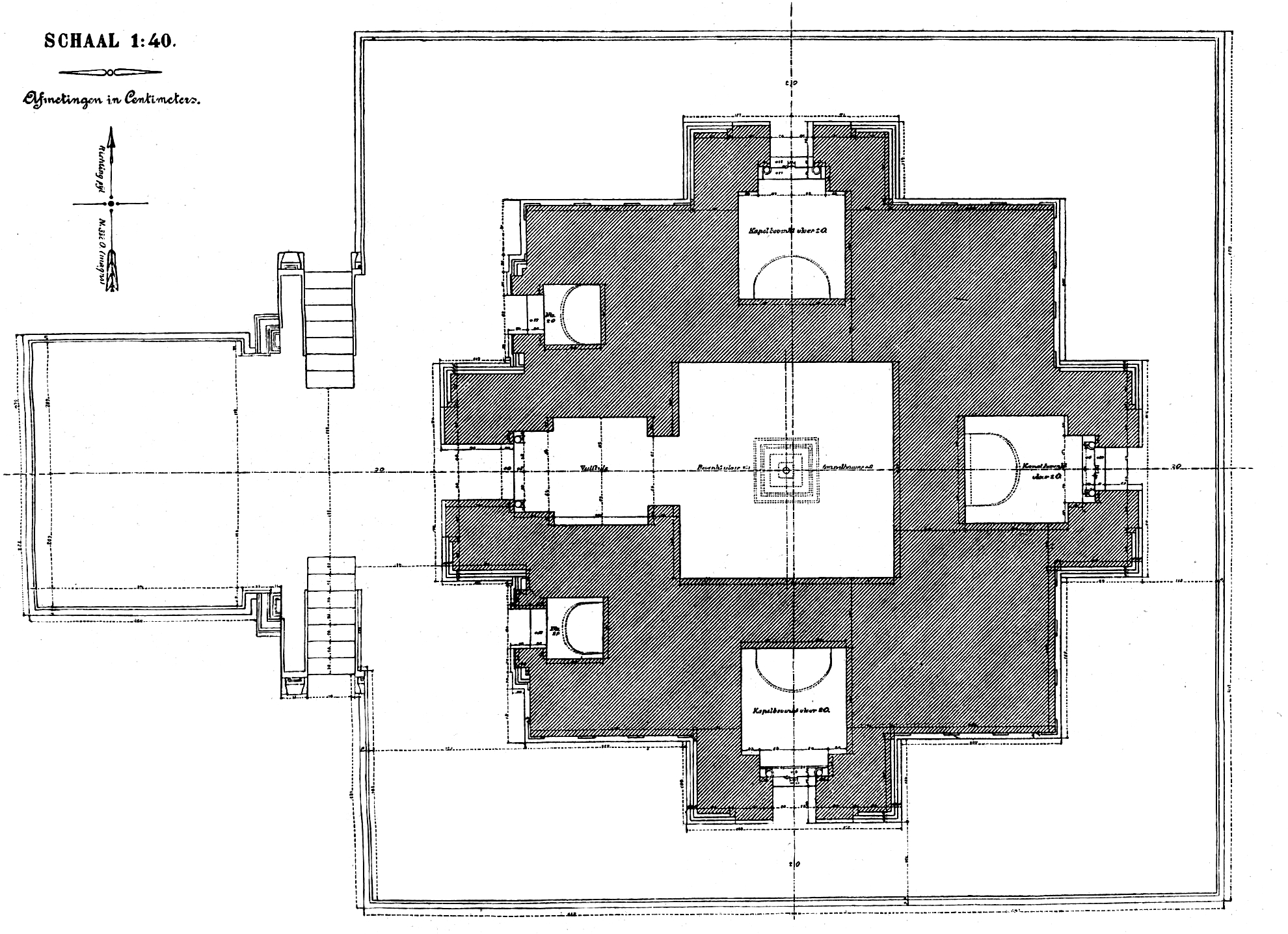
Floorplan (ca. 1901)

Singhasari Temple or Candi Singhasari is a 13th-century syncretic Buddhist temple located in Singosari district, Malang Regency, East Java in Indonesia.

== Location ==
The temple is located on Jalan Kertanegara, Candirenggo village, Singosari district, about 10 kilometres north from Malang city, on the valley between two mountain ranges, the Tengger-Bromo in the east and Arjuno-Welirang in the west, with elevation 512 metres above sea level. The temple orientation is facing northwest towards Mount Arjuno. It is linked to the historical Singhasari kingdom of East Java, as the site around the temple is believed to be the center of Javanese court of Singhasari.

== History ==
The temple was mentioned in the Javanese poem Nagarakretagama canto 37:7 and 38:3 and also in Gajah Mada inscription dated 1351 and discovered in the temple's yard. According to these sources, the temple is the funerary temple of King Kertanagara (ruled 1268 — 1292), the last king of the Singhasari dynasty, whose assassination in 1292 by Jayakatwang of Gelang-gelang finally led to the establishment of Majapahit rule.

The temple's unfinished state can be seen in the incomplete kala head over its lower entrance. The temple faces northwest. Its lower level is Bodhisattva, but the temple has a second cella on the upper level, that was a Buddhist dedication. Alternate spellings: Kertanagara for Kertanegara, and Singosari for Singhasari.

Significant features of the temple include:

- A pair of colossal Dvarapalas--giant monolith statues as the guardians of Singhasari royal cemeteries
- A well-carved Kala on the west upper face
- A large original statue of Bodhisattva in the lower southern cella.

Chulalongkorn, the King of Siam, visited the temple in 1896 during his trip to Java. Here he found a four-armed Buddhist Vinayaka image that he later personally requested to be transported back to Bangkok. The statue was once placed in Wat Phra Kaew before being relocated to Bangkok National Museum, where it stands today.

== Gallery ==
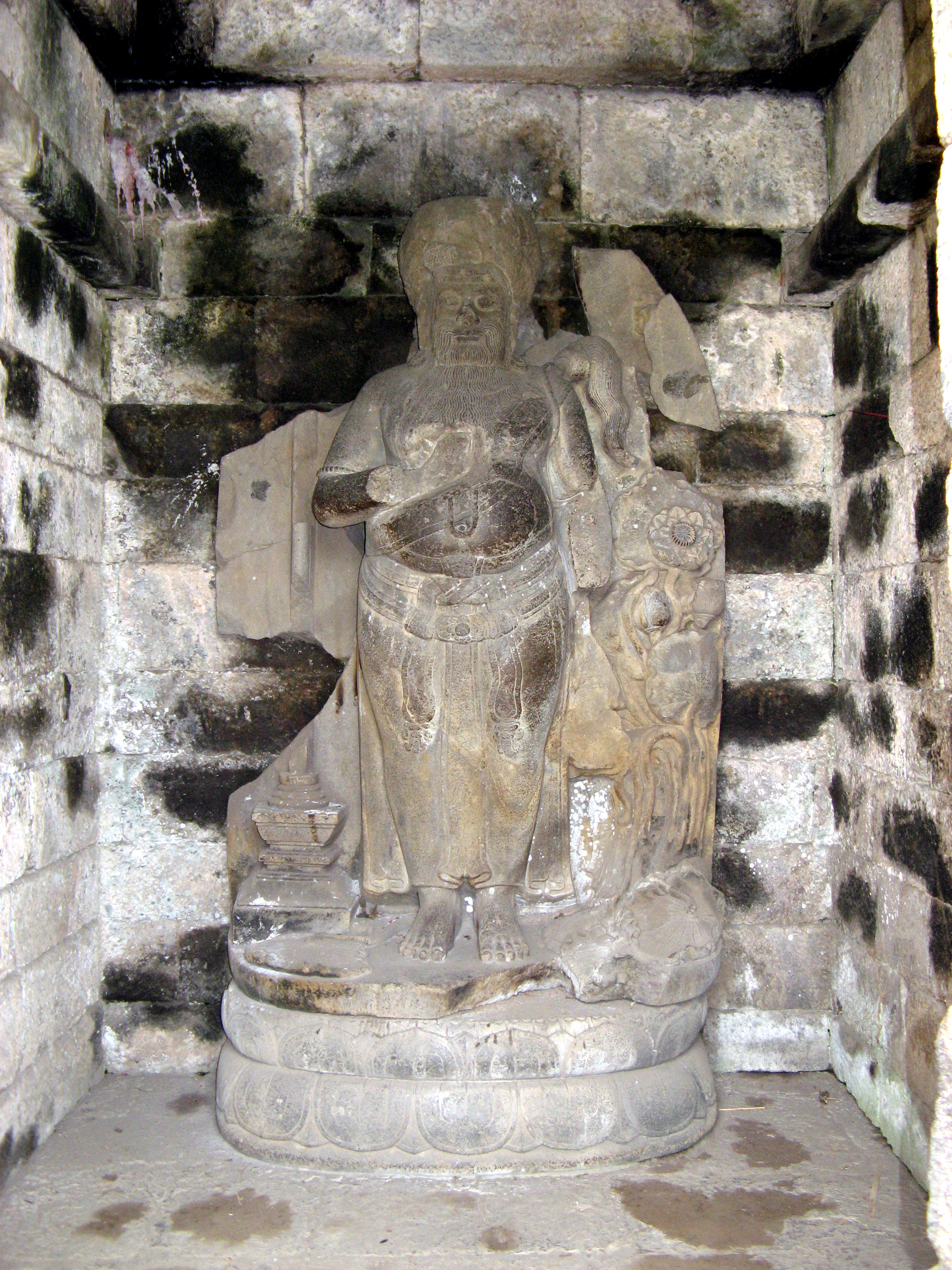
Shiva as Batara Guru , Singhasari

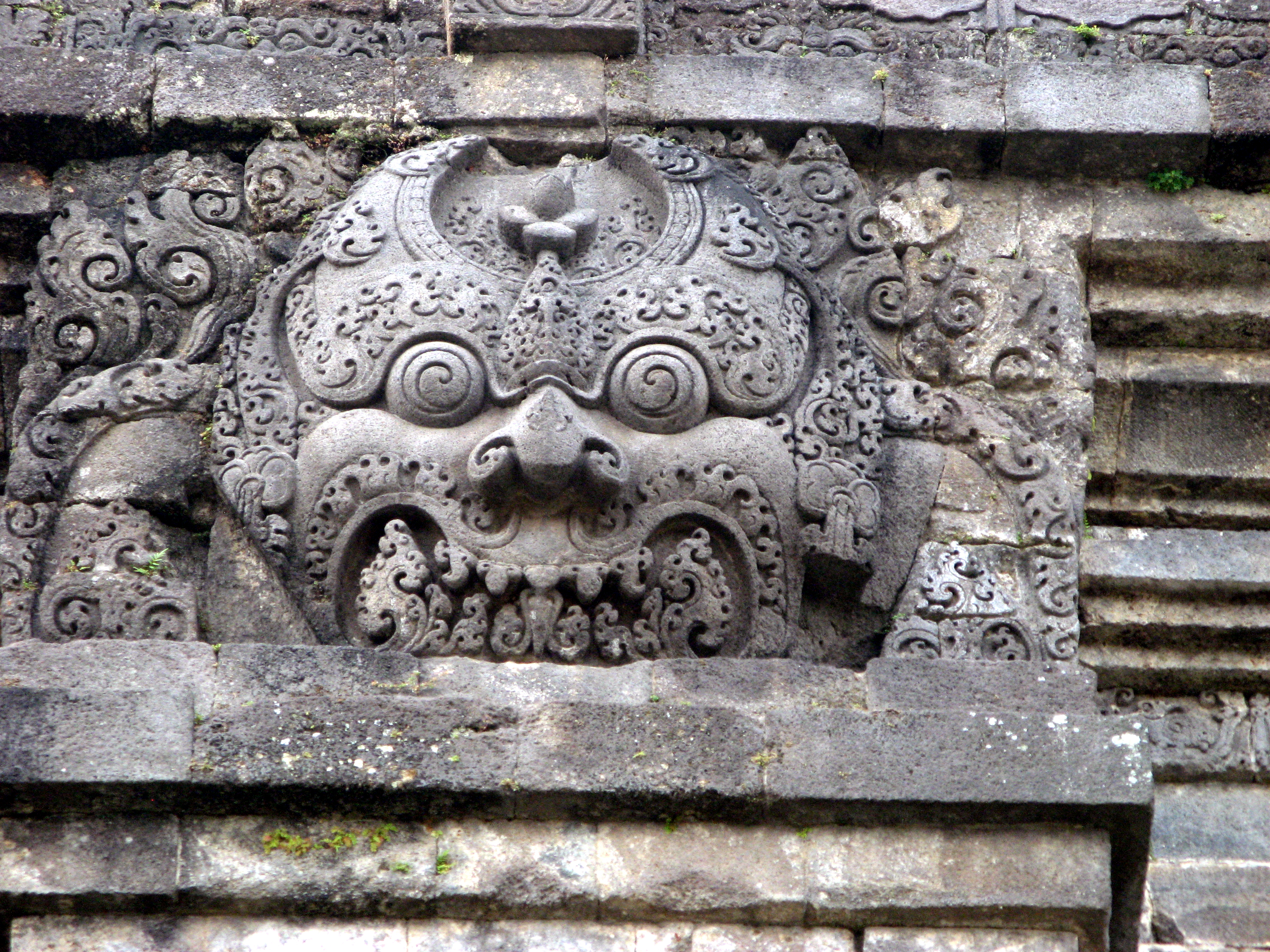
Kala's head above the portal of Singhasari temple

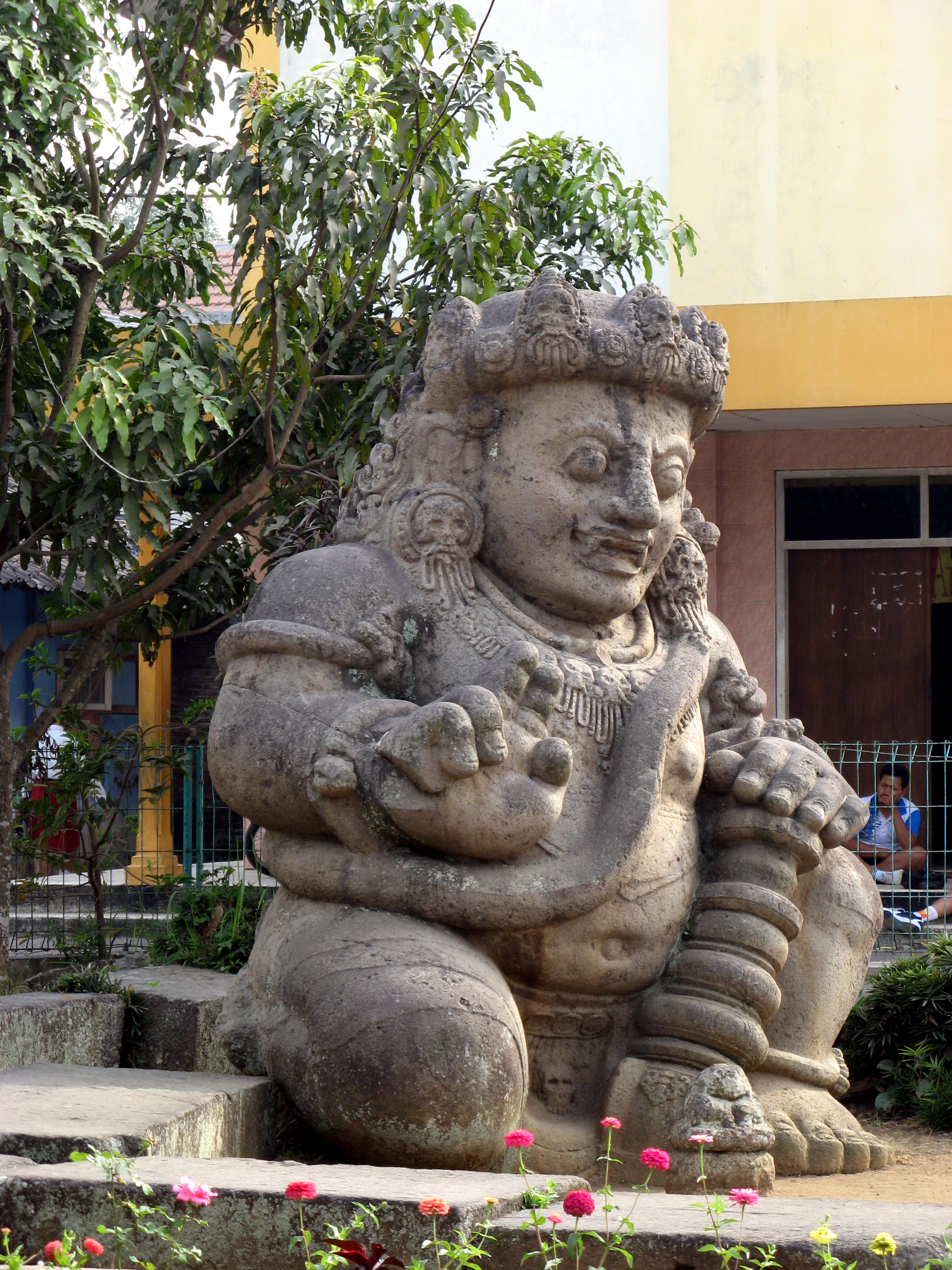
One of a pair of dvarapalas

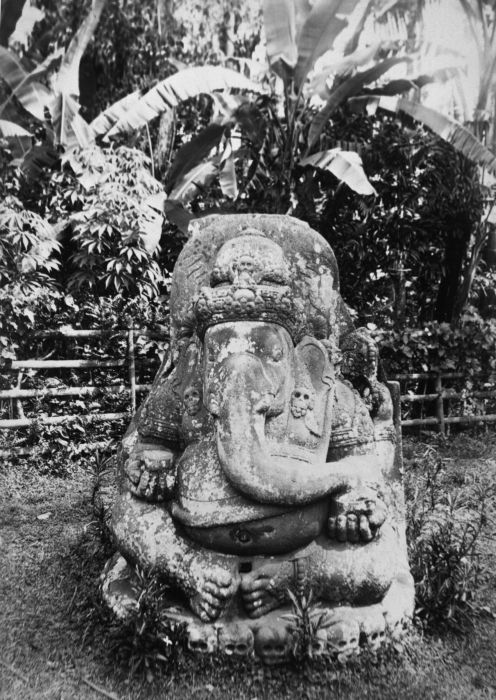
Four-armed Ganesha, currently a collection of Bangkok National Museum, Thailand

== See also ==
- Buddhism in Indonesia
- Candi of Indonesia
- Hinduism in Indonesia
- Hinduism in Java
- Indonesian Esoteric Buddhism
- Prajnaparamita of Java
