= Nalanda University =

Central university in Rajgir, Bihar, India

Nālandā University
- Nālandā Vishwavidyalaya
- Former name: Nalanda International University
- Motto: Ā no bhadrāḥ kratavo yantu viśvataḥ (Sanskrit); Let noble thoughts come to us from all directions (Rigveda 1.89.1)
- Established: 25 November 2010; 15 years ago
- Affiliations: NAAC, UGC, Ministry of External Affairs (India)
- Endowment: $210 million
- Chancellor: Arvind Panagariya
- Vice-Chancellor: Sachin Chaturvedi
- Visitor: President of India
- Undergraduates: None, Postgraduates Only
- Postgraduates: 1,038
- Colors
- Website: nalandauniv.edu.in
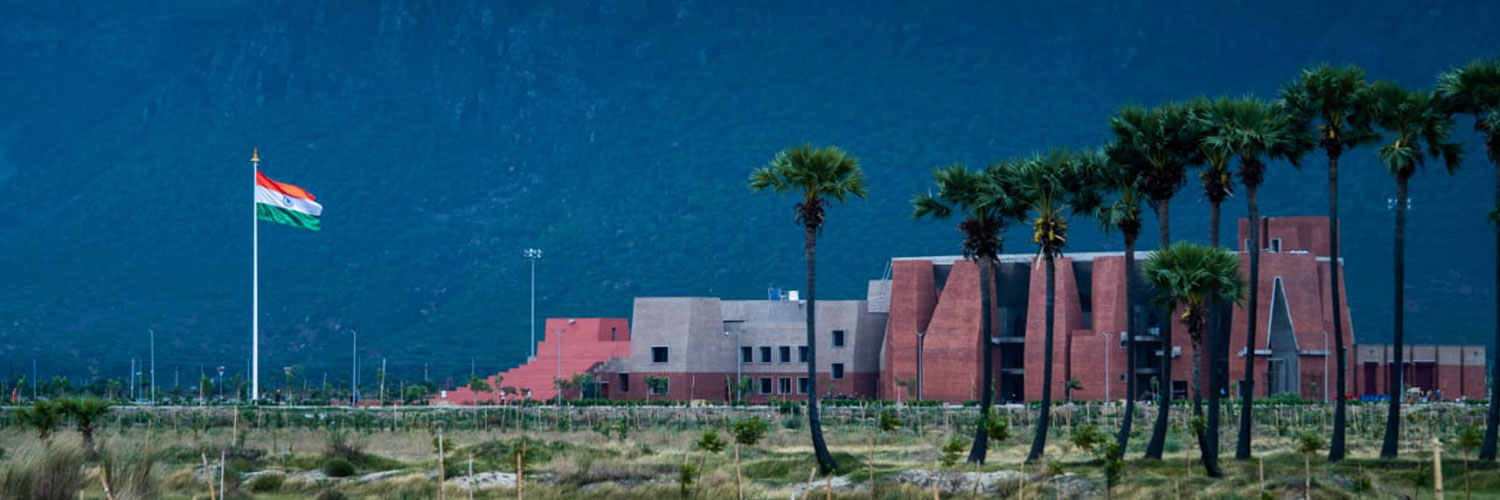

Nālandā University (informally NU; or ISO: Nālandā Vishwavidyalaya) is a central research university located in the ancient city of Rajgir in the state of Bihar, India. Designated by the government as an Institute of National Importance (INI) and excellence, Nālandā is the flagship university of the Ministry of External Affairs of India (MEA), and was founded in 2010 as a successor to the Nalanda Mahavihara of medieval Magadha. It is an international university and is named for the Sanskrit words Na-Alam-Da, meaning "The giver of lotus-stalks." It functions as a postgraduate research institute, offering only Master's and PhD degrees. Traditionally regarded as a symbol of India's historical legacy, the new Nālandā University retains a celebrated status within the nation.

The university was established by an Act of the Indian Parliament in 2010, with the President of India serving as the Visitor. It is an international university supported by 18 member countries of the East Asia Summit, with the initial proposal being placed by the former President of India A. P. J. Abdul Kalam. The first Chancellor of the university was Nobel Laureate Amartya Sen, followed by Singapore's Foreign Affairs Minister George Yeo.

Built at an initial cost of $210 million and spread over 485 acres, the campus is among the largest in India and the first in the country to implement a 'Net Zero' eco-recycling strategy. Nālandā University offers degree programmes in the School of Historical Studies (SHS), the School of Ecology and Environment Studies (SEES), the School of Buddhist Studies (SBS), the School of Philosophy and Comparative Religions (SPCR), the School of Languages and Literature/Humanities (SLLH), and the School of Management Studies (SMS). It also offers degrees in the study of the Sanātana Dharma, as well as diplomas in languages such as Sanskrit, Pāli, Tibetan, Japanese and Korean. The new campus in Rajgir was inaugurated by the Prime Minister of India Narendra Modi on June 19, 2024 in the presence of officials, ambassadors and dignitaries from all 10 ASEAN members.

The university houses three distinct institutions that are part of the Nalanda vision of bringing the various sects of the Dharmic community together. They include the Centre for Bay of Bengal, the Centre for Conflict Resolution and Peace Building, and the Common Archival Resource Centre. Nālandā University has subsequently established MoUs and academic collaborations with numerous universities and research institutes worldwide, as well as ICWA, IIPHG, ASI, ICCR, ISEAS, IIAS and CSIR.

== The university ==
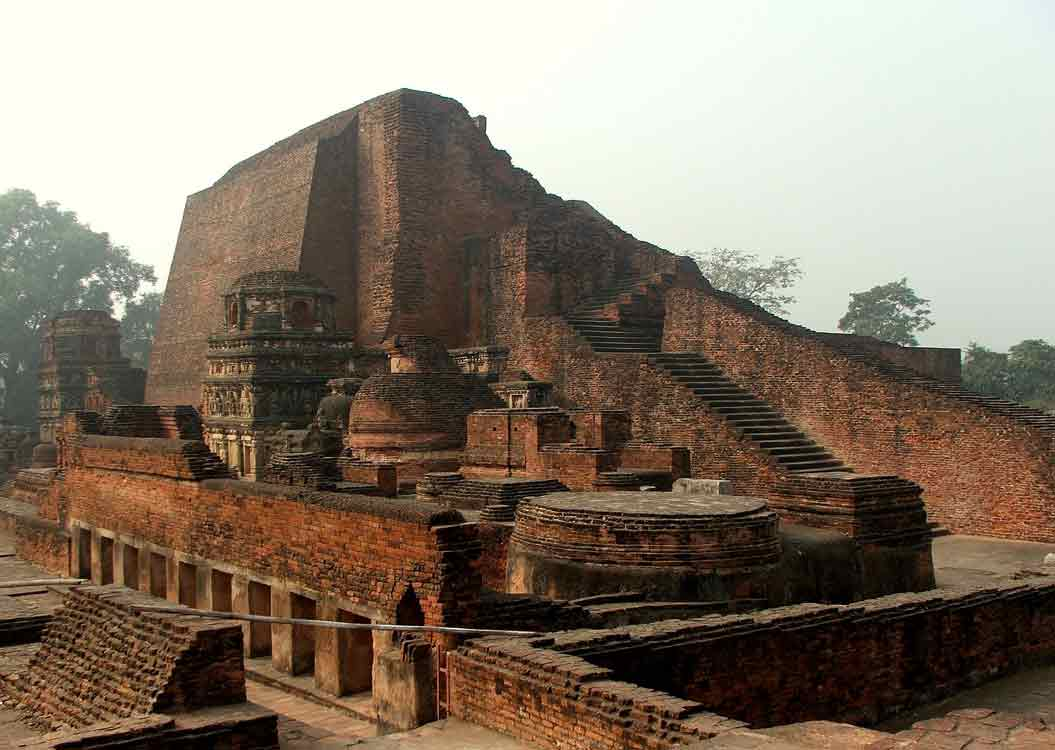
Ancient Nalanda University

Nalanda University was established to emulate the ancient university of Nalanda (Nalanda mahavihara), which functioned between the 5th and 13th centuries. The idea to resurrect Nalanda University was endorsed in 2007 at the 2nd East Asia Summit by the sixteen member countries. In 2009, during the 4th East Asia summit, ASEAN member states including Australia, China, Korea, Singapore and Japan promised further support. The Government of Bihar handed over land acquired from local people, to the university for its new campus. Chief Minister of Bihar Nitish Kumar also met External Affairs Minister SM Krishna to receive reassurance that the Central Government would allocate sufficient funds to the project.

The architectural design was chosen on the basis of a global competition. The jury consisting of architects including Liu Thai Ker chose Pritzker Prize laureate BV Doshi's firm, Vastu Shilpa Consultants as the winner of the design competition. The firm dbHMS provides the triple net zero energy, water and waste strategic plan. Original concepts associated with the project included "advancing the concept of an Asian community...and rediscovering old relationships." and "acting as a bridge for students in different parts of Southeast Asia".

The university has been envisioned as an international institution of national importance and excellence. It began its first academic session on 1 September 2014 with 15 students in the School of Historical Studies and the School of Ecology and Environmental studies. A hotel operated by Bihar State Tourism Development Corporation in Rajgir provided initial hostel accommodation. Initially set up with temporary facilities in Rajgir, a modern campus spanning over 160 hectares (400 acres) is under construction with over 80 percent having been completed by 2021. The university started functioning from its 455-acres new campus from January 2020. At least 200 villages surrounding the university will be attached to the university, reminiscent of the old Nalanda.

Nalanda University becomes the first plastic free campus of Bihar. Water in the university is now being available in glass bottles instead of plastic bottles. Along with this, biogas will also be produced.

For the academic year 2022-23, the University had 822 students in total. For the academic year 2023-24, the University had admitted 1038 students, out of which a total of 187 are international students (including Masters, Global PhD & Short Programmes as per January cycle).

=== Nalanda University Act ===
On 28 March 2006 the eleventh President of India A. P. J. Abdul Kalam proposed the idea while addressing the Joint Session of the Bihar Vidhan Mandal for the revival of Nalanda University. In 2007 the Bihar Legislative Assembly passed a bill for the creation of a new university.

The Nalanda University Bill, 2010 was passed on 21 August 2010 in Rajya Sabha and 26 August 2010 in Lok Sabha. The bill received Presidential assent on 21 September 2010 thereby becoming an Act. The university came into existence on 25 November 2010, when the Act was implemented.

== Governance ==
The university's visitor is the President of India. The chancellor and chairperson of the governing board is Prof. Arvind Panagariya. The interim vice-chancellor was Prof. Abhay Kumar Singh. The current Vice Chancellor is Professor Sachin Chaturvedi. The governing board comprises the chancellor, vice-chancellor, representative from member countries, a secretary, two representatives from the Government of Bihar, a representative from the Ministry of Human Resource Development, and three persons in the category of "Renowned Academician or Educationist", Arvind Sharma, Lokesh Chandra and Arvind Panagariya.

The first chancellor of the university was Amartya Sen, followed by former Singapore Minister for Foreign Affairs George Yeo. They left citing concerns about autonomy and political interference in academic matters. Vijay Pandurang Bhatkar has been appointed the new chancellor on 25 January 2017 by President Pranab Mukherjee, in his capacity as Visitor to Nalanda University. In 2017, Interim Vice-Chancellor Pankaj Mohan handed over charge to Professor Sunaina Singh.

== Schools and centres ==
Nalanda is exclusively a graduate school, currently offering master's courses, and doctor of philosophy programmes.

Nalanda University has five functional Schools at present:

- School of Historical Studies
- School of Ecology and Environmental Studies
- School of Buddhist Studies, Philosophy and Comparative Religion
- School of Languages and Literature/Humanities
- School of Management Studies

The following schools are planned to start later, in a phased manner:

- School of International Relations and Peace Studies
- School of Information Sciences and Technology
- School of Business Management (Public Policy and Development Studies)

Three centres — Centre for Bay of Bengal, Centre for Conflict Resolution and Peace Building, and Common Archival Resource Centre— will be operational soon.

The School of Languages and Literature/Humanities commenced its operations with one year Post-Graduate Diploma Programmes in Pali, Sanskrit, Tibetan, Korean and English in 2018. Master's and doctoral programmes commenced in 2021. It is planned to gradually expand to include other programmes in Indian and foreign languages.

== See also ==
- Education in Bihar
- Institutes of National Importance
- International university
