= Four-armed Ganesha (Candi Singhasari) =

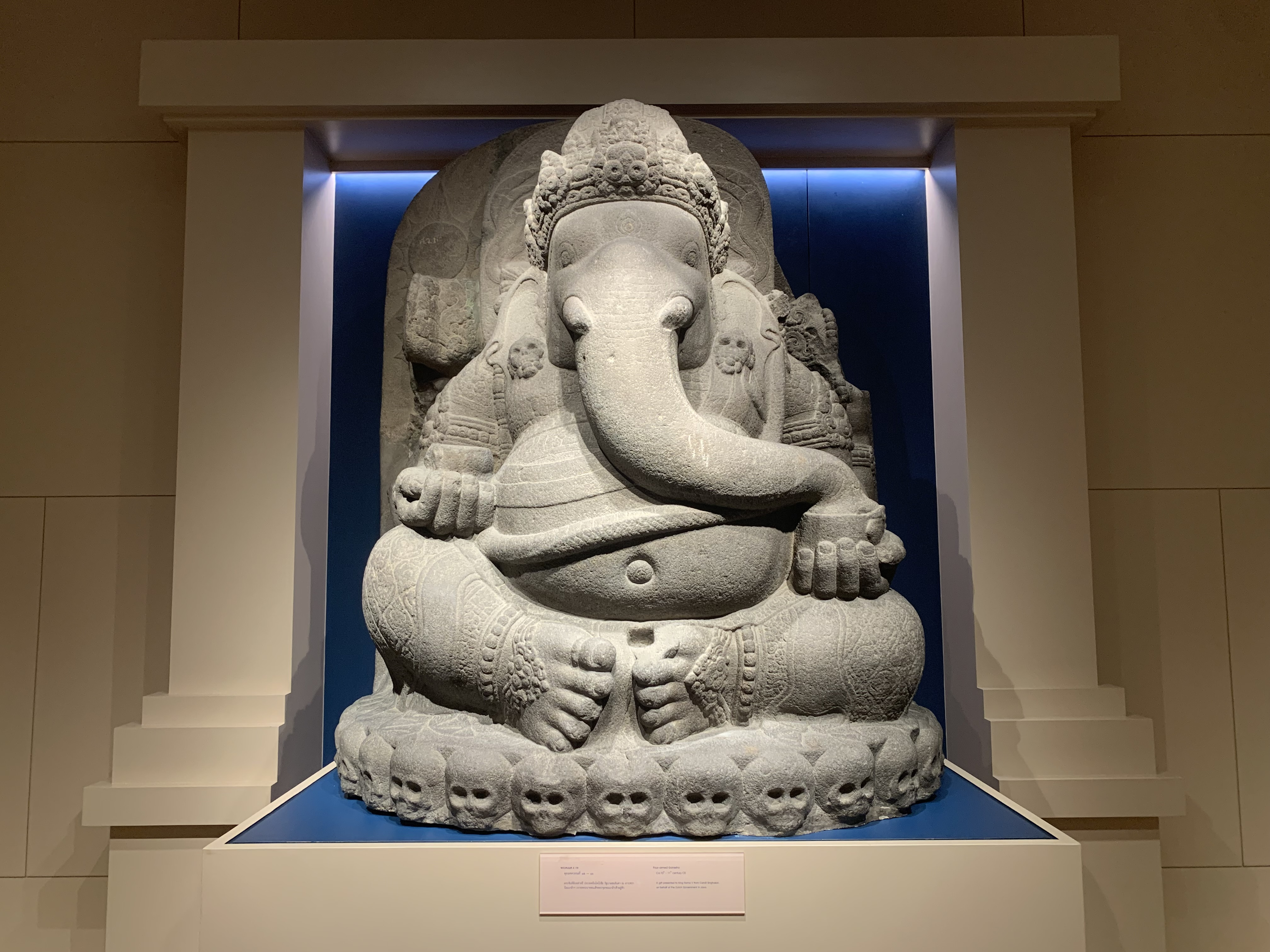
- The statue on display in Bangkok National Museum
- Material: Stone
- Height: 172 centimetres (68 in)
- Created: 10th-11th century
- Discovered: 22 July 1896; Candi Singhasari (modern-day Malang Regency, Indonesia)
- Discovered by: Chulalongkorn
- Present location: Mahasurasinghanat Building, Bangkok National Museum, Bangkok, Thailand

Four-armed Ganesha from Candi Singhasari is a stone sculpture depicting Hindu god Ganesha of eastern Javanese style, dated to 10th-11th century A.D. It was obtained from Java by Chulalongkorn, King of Siam, during his trip to the island in 1896. Currently, it is a collection of Bangkok National Museum, on display in the museum's Mahasurasinghanat Building in Bangkok, Thailand.

The sculpture was discovered in Candi Singhasari, located in modern-day Singosari, Malang Regency, East Java, Indonesia; 10 kilometres north of the regency's capital Malang. The candi was an unfinished Hindu-Buddhist temple built in the 13th century. It was left uncompleted as the Singhasari kingdom ended after its King Kertanagara was assassinated by Jayakatwang of Kediri kingdom during a Tantric ceremony, not too far from this temple. Assuming Thai Fine Arts Department's dating of the sculpture to the 10th-11th century, it could be that the sculpture was built before the temple, then was later moved to the temple grounds.

At Prasat Nakhon Luang in Thailand's Phra Nakhon Si Ayutthaya province also exists another Ganesha statue, located in front of the Mandapa of Buddhapāda on top of the structure. The statue is believed to have been modelled after the artefect from Candi Singhasari.

== Design ==
The sculpture is 172 centimetres (68 in)-tall. It depicts Hindu god Ganesha with four arms, seated on top of a throne made of human skulls. His upper-right hand is holding an axe and his upper-left hand is holding a rosary, whilst his both lower hands are holding bowls of treats. His headwear as well as other ornaments were human skulls, asides from a snake thread. The artistic style belongs to eastern Javanese style, dated to the 10th-11th century.

Thai archaeologist Sujit Wongthes suggested the god's positioning as seated atop of human skulls is interpreted symbolically as a "power over the local animism" or "conquering the local spirits" as Hinduism was introduced in place of local folk animistic systems of believe. Thai religious studies scholar Siripoj Laomanacharoen further noted the water outside both of Ganesha's temples, suggesting the elephant god is in musth. This fits into Wongthes's interpretation of the god to be performing an act of "conquering".

== History ==
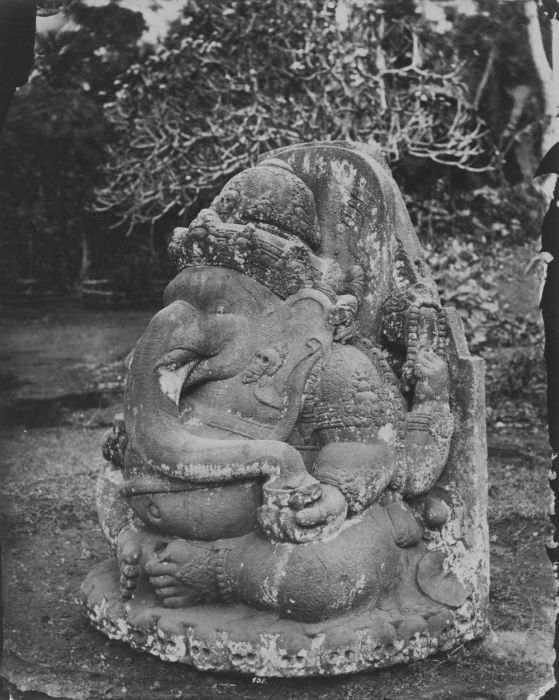
In-situ at Candi Singhasari, photographed c. 1857-1874

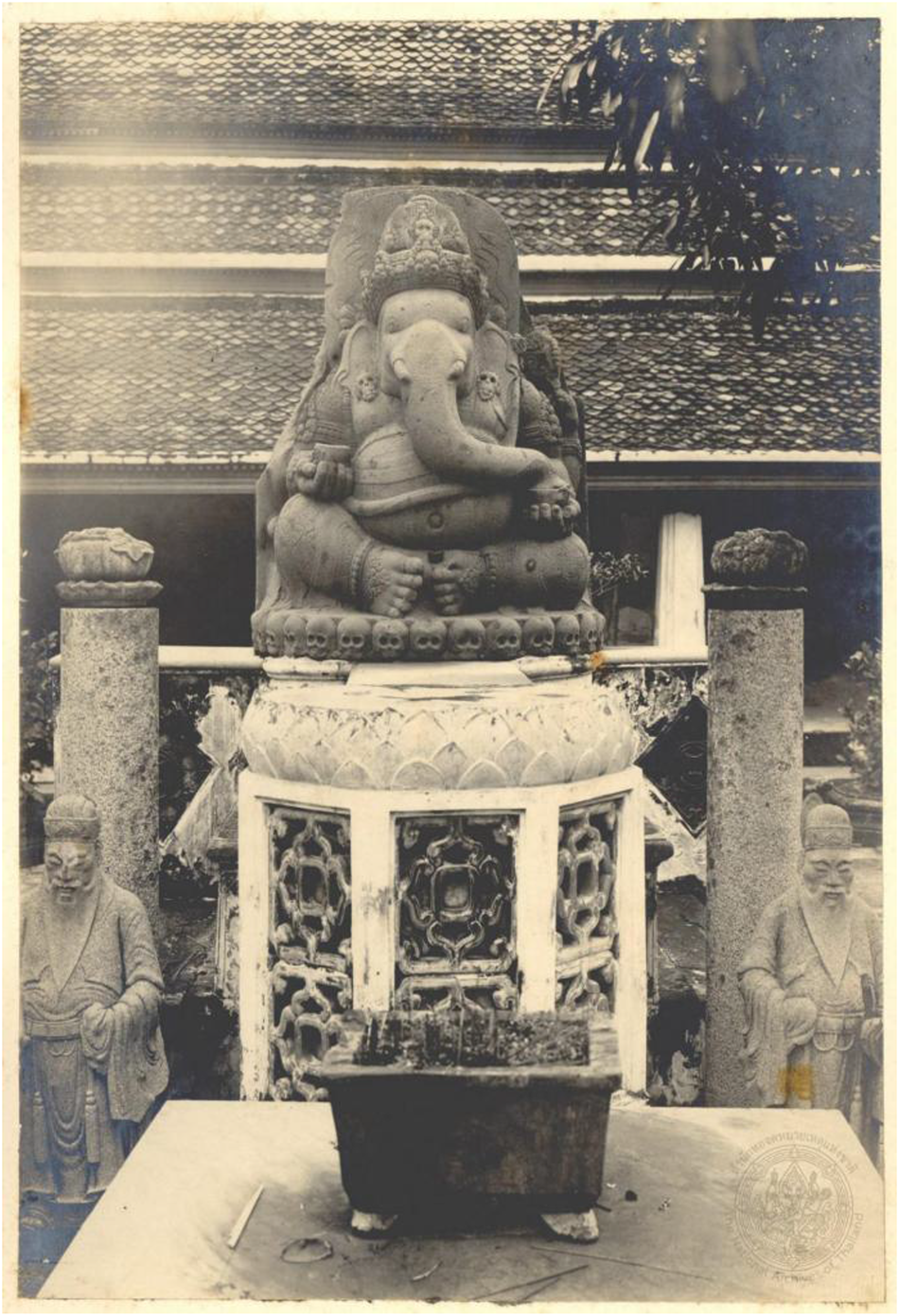
Enshrined in Wat Phra Kaew, photographed in 1921

Thailand's Fine Arts Department described the statue as given by the Dutch colonial government to Chulalongkorn, the King of Siam during his trip to the Java island in 1896, the same trip which he visited and also obtained some artefacts from archaeological sites including the Borobudur. The King wrote about the sculpture in his diary as he visited Candi Singhasari on 22 July 1896, writing "Gigantic image of Maha Vighaneshavara ["great Ganesha"], defect at an arm, but of great artistry; I wish to obtain." He would later order an accompanying Pasuruan local to request the Ganesha image from the governor-general Van Wijck, who agreed to have it shipped to Siam. The locals likewise did not refused the decision, as they were previously documented to have attempted to destroy the remaining statues in the candi. Four days later, the King wrote a personal letter to thank the governor-general, stating in English: "for these figures, I have not only to thank the Netherland Indian Government for myself, but also in the name of the Siamese nation, whose high appreciation of them will always remind them of the giver."

Arriving in Bangkok from Semarang, the statue was then moved to Bangkok's Wat Phra Kaew, right in front of the ubosot in which the Emerald Buddha is enshrined. It was later moved to Bangkok National Museum where it remains to todays, being on display in Isara Vinijchai Throne Hall until 1967.

In the 1920s, Theodoor van Erp (1874-1958), representing the Archaeological Service in the Dutch East Indies (Oudheidkundige Dienst in Nederlandsch-Indie), requested the Thai government to return various artefacts that Chulalongkorn had acquired from Java during his 1896 trip. In 1926, he sent an entourage to negotiate the repartition of the items, amongst them are the Ganesha statue from Candi Singhasari and other items from Borobudur. The Ganesha statue would continue to remain in Thailand, as it had become "emotionally intertwined" with the locals since Chulalongkorn gave it to the public, according to a reply from George Cœdès who represented the Thai Fine Arts Department. The Royal Batavian Society of Arts and Sciences, which was independent of the Archaeological Service, later discovered the upper-left part missing from the sculpture in Candi Singhasari. The item was then given to the colonial government who then passed it on to the Thai King Prajadhipok in 1928.
