= Ross University =

Ross University may refer to:

- Ross University School of Medicine, a medical school in Barbados offering the Doctor of Medicine degree
- Ross University School of Veterinary Medicine, a veterinary school in St. Kitts offering the Doctor of Veterinary Medicine degree
