= Indian Institute of Public Health, Gandhinagar =

- Type: Private
- Established: 2015; 11 years ago
- Affiliations: UGC
- Chairperson: Parimal Nathwani
- Director: Dileep Mavalankar
- Location: Gandhinagar, Gujarat, India
- Website: iiphg.edu.in

Indian Institute of Public Health, Gandhinagar (IIPHG) is a private university located in Gandhinagar, Gujarat, India. The university was established in 2015 by the Public Health Foundation of India (PHFI) through The Indian Institute of Public Health Gandhinagar Act, 2015, one of five Indian Institutes of Public Health established by PHFI and the first to be granted university status. It is the first university in India to focus solely on public health.

== History ==
The Government of Gujarat and the Public Health Foundation of India entered an MoU in 2007 for the establishment of the institute. The foundation stone was laid in 2008 by Narendra Modi, then Chief Minister of Gujarat. The institute started operation in 2008 from a temporary location in Ahmedabad. In 2015 the permanent campus in Gandhinagar was inaugurated and the institute was granted university status.

== Academics ==
The university offers two-year Masters in Public Health and Master of Hospital Administration, as well as a one-year diploma course and various short term and distance learning programmes.
