= Ecole Supérieure Multinationale des Télécommunications =

Institution in Dakar, Senegal

Ecole Supérieure Multinationale des Télécommunications (ESMT)
- Type: Intergovernmental Organisation
- Established: 1981
- President: Director General
- Doctoral students: N/A
- Location: Dakar, Senegal, Dakar, Senegal
- Website: www.esmt.sn

The ESMT logo

ESMT (Ecole Supérieure Multinationale des Télécommunications) is an international institution of higher learning based in Senegal. It offers professional certifications and graduate programs in telecommunication.

== History ==
The organisation was created in 1981 by seven West African states, (Benin, Burkina Faso, Mali, Mauritania, Niger, Senegal, and Togo) on the basis of an initial UNDP programme and funding. In 1986, the school obtained a diplomatic status in Senegal with the headquarters agreement. In 1998, Guinea (Conakry) joined the other seven countries as founding state.

== Activities ==
The organisation is involved in initial training, continuous training and research.
