= Cungkup =

Type of building

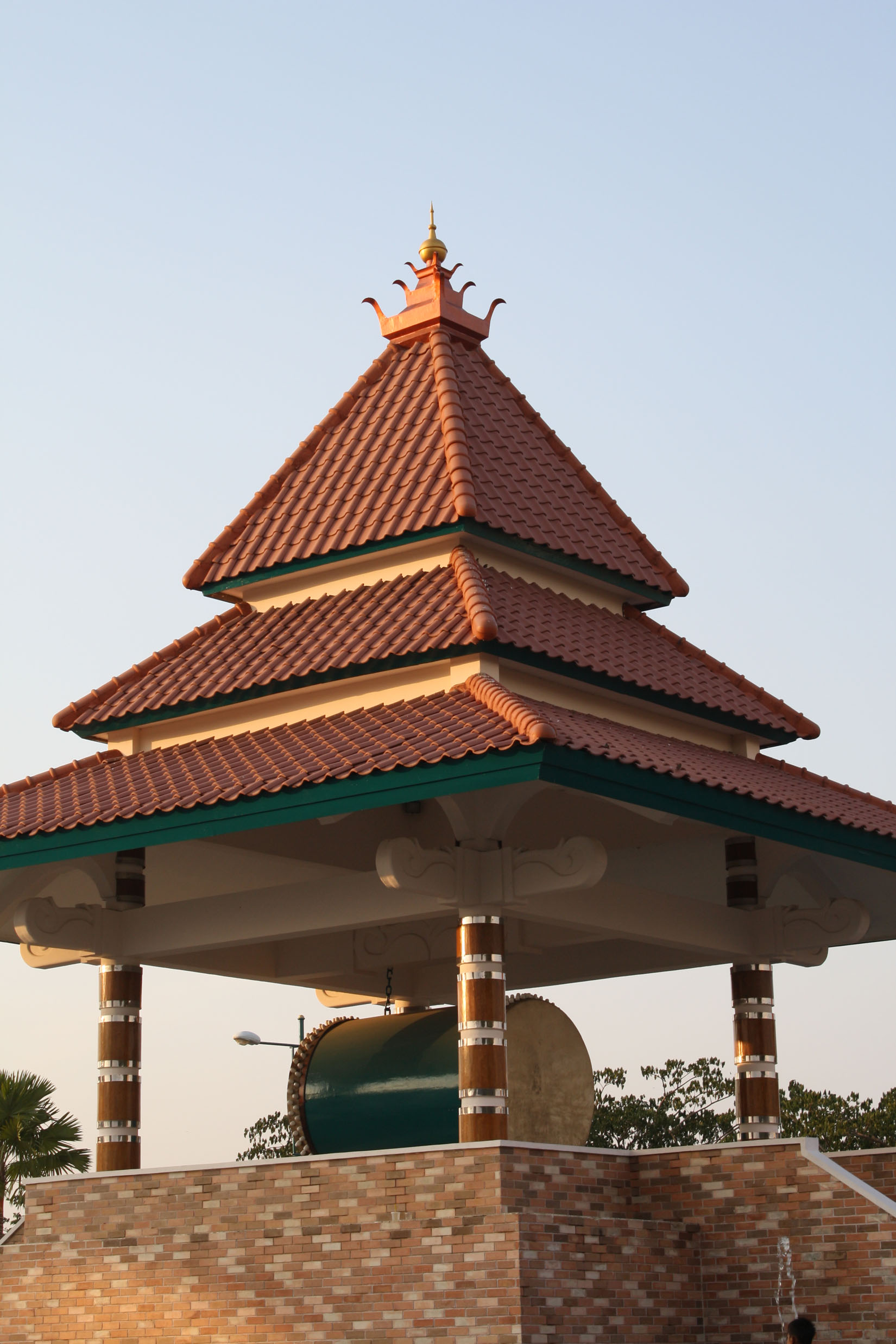
Cungkup used to shade a bedug at The Great Mosque of Central Java

Cungkup is an Indonesian square building with a roof made to shade or protect something, usually a grave, inscription, or nameplate. They are also used to shade other important objects. The cungkup has also been thought to have inspired the tiered-roof style of Javanese mosques, this theory is supported by the fact that cungkup aren't tiered, with the Giri Cungkup in East Java as the only known exception.

There are a couple of traditional patterns that are often used accompanying cungkup. Some examples would be the cape flower patterns which is thought to be a sign to welcome people to the location, that's why the pattern is usually carved into doorways. Cape flower patterns also have vines and leaves accompanying them to complete the pattern. There's also a jasmine flower pattern which is thought to be a sign of politeness in Palembang traditions. The Malay people see the jasmine flower pattern as holy since jasmine flowers are often used in religious rituals. Lots of these patterns are local and have different meanings in different places.

== Applications ==
=== Cemeteries ===
Traditionally, Islamic graves in Indonesia are characterized by three things, which are a grave, a tombstone, and a cungkup. Cungkup are generally built for people who were highly respected in their communities since cungkup are meant to protect the grave. Some notable graves with Cungkup built for them are Sukarno's grave in Blitar, Tuanku Imam Bonjol's grave in Minahasa, and W.R. Supratman's grave in Surabaya The construction of cungkup are usually found in the islands of Java, Sumatra, and Sulawesi, though they are not fully exclusive to these places.

=== Inscriptions ===
Cungkup is also built for inscriptions if it's outside, this is so it doesn't get damaged by the weather among other things. Usually, inscriptions shown in a museum will have a cungkup dedicated to it if it isn't protected by a glass case.

=== Nameplates ===
Nameplates for office buildings and other important buildings usually have a cungkup protecting it. This serves as a protection for the nameplate since they are susceptible to weather damage and rust.

== Gallery ==
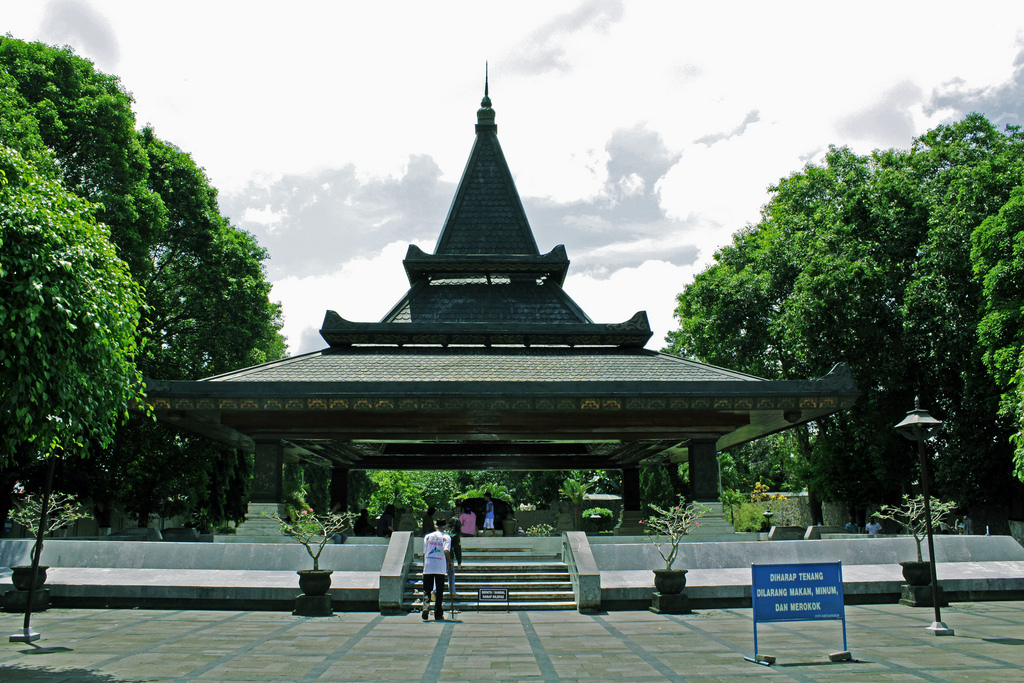
Cungkup at Sukarno's grave, Blitar.

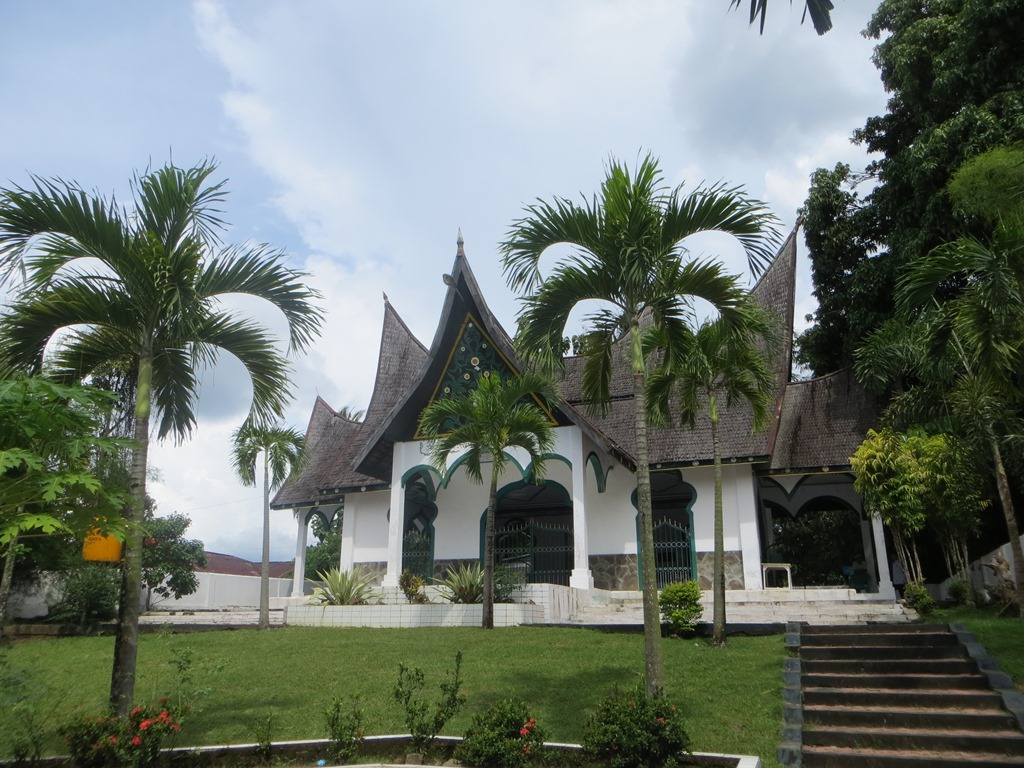
Cungkup styled with Minangkabau architecture at Tuanku Imam Bonjol's grave in Minahasa

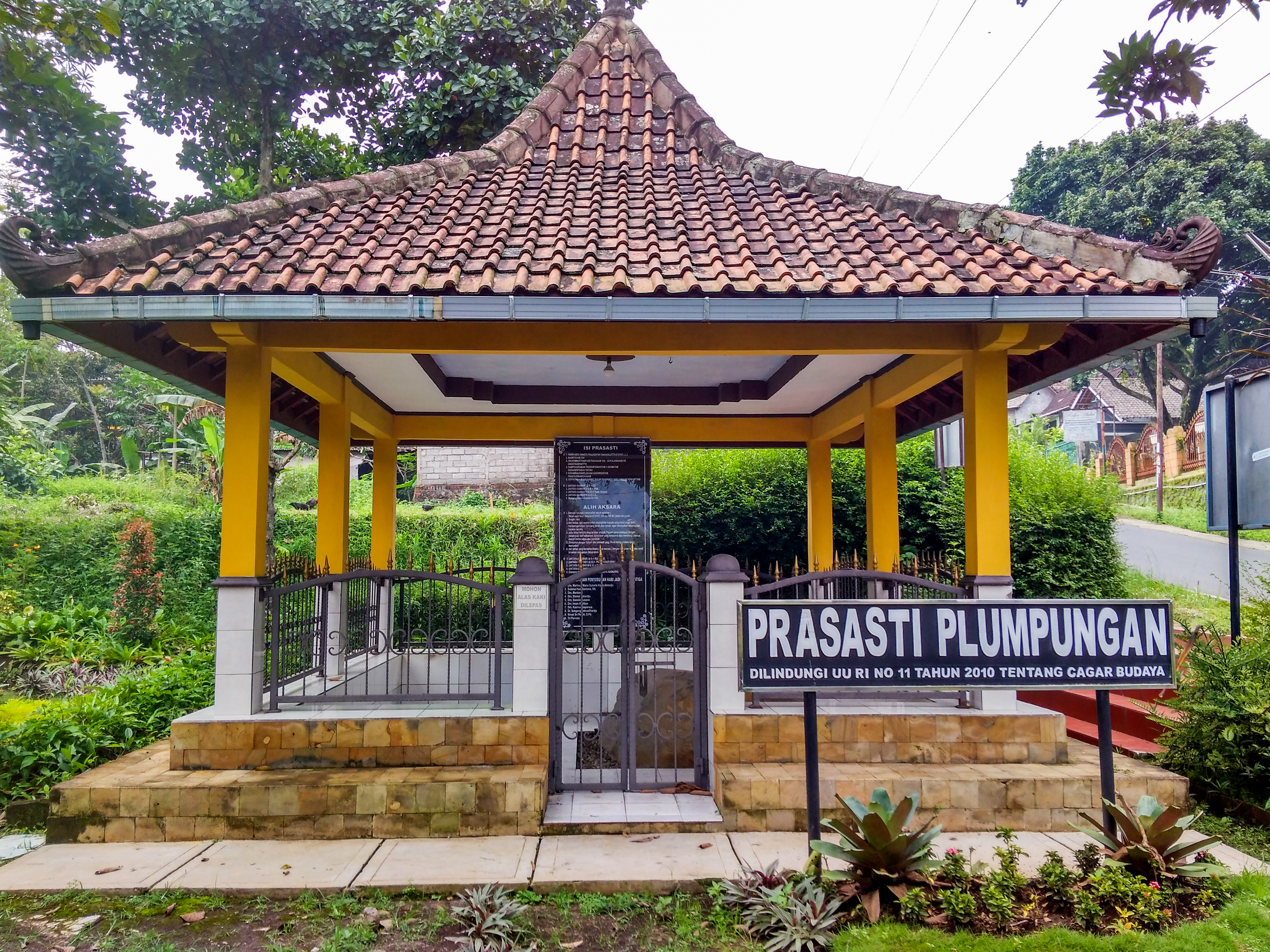
A cungkup protecting the Plumpungan Inscription, Salatiga

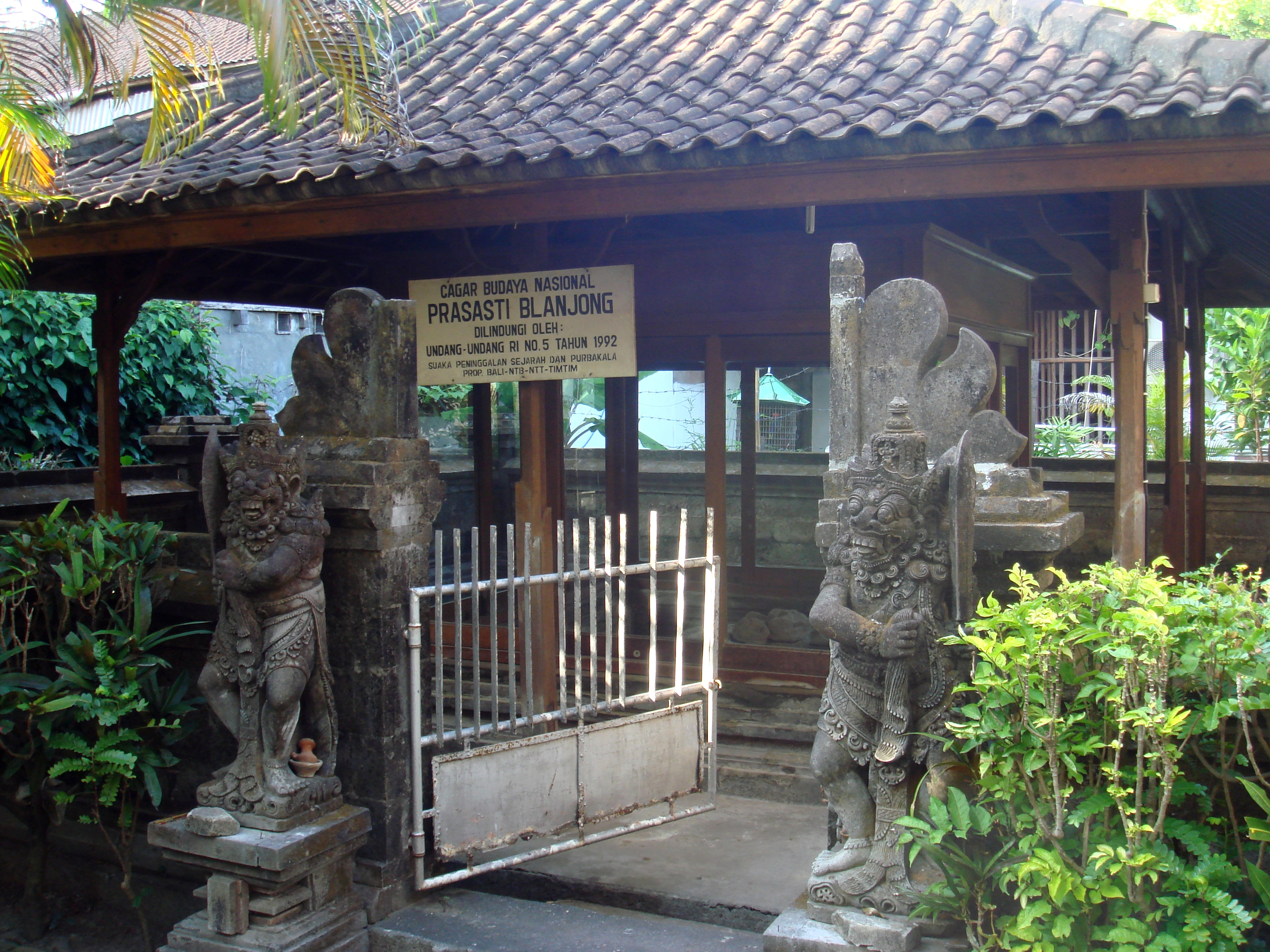
A cungkup protecting the Blanjong inscription, Denpasar

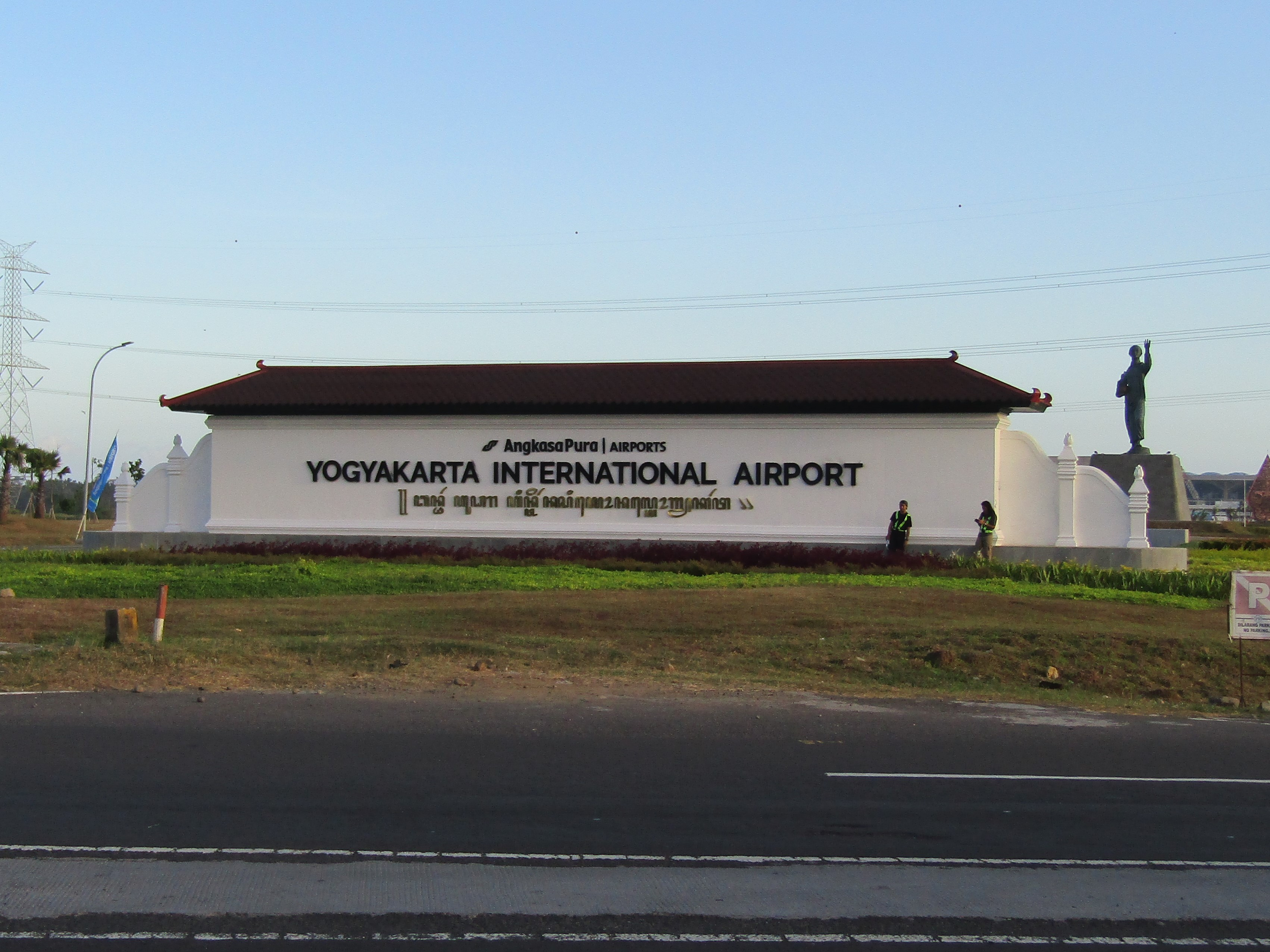
The Yogyakarta International Airport's nameplate with a cungkup above it

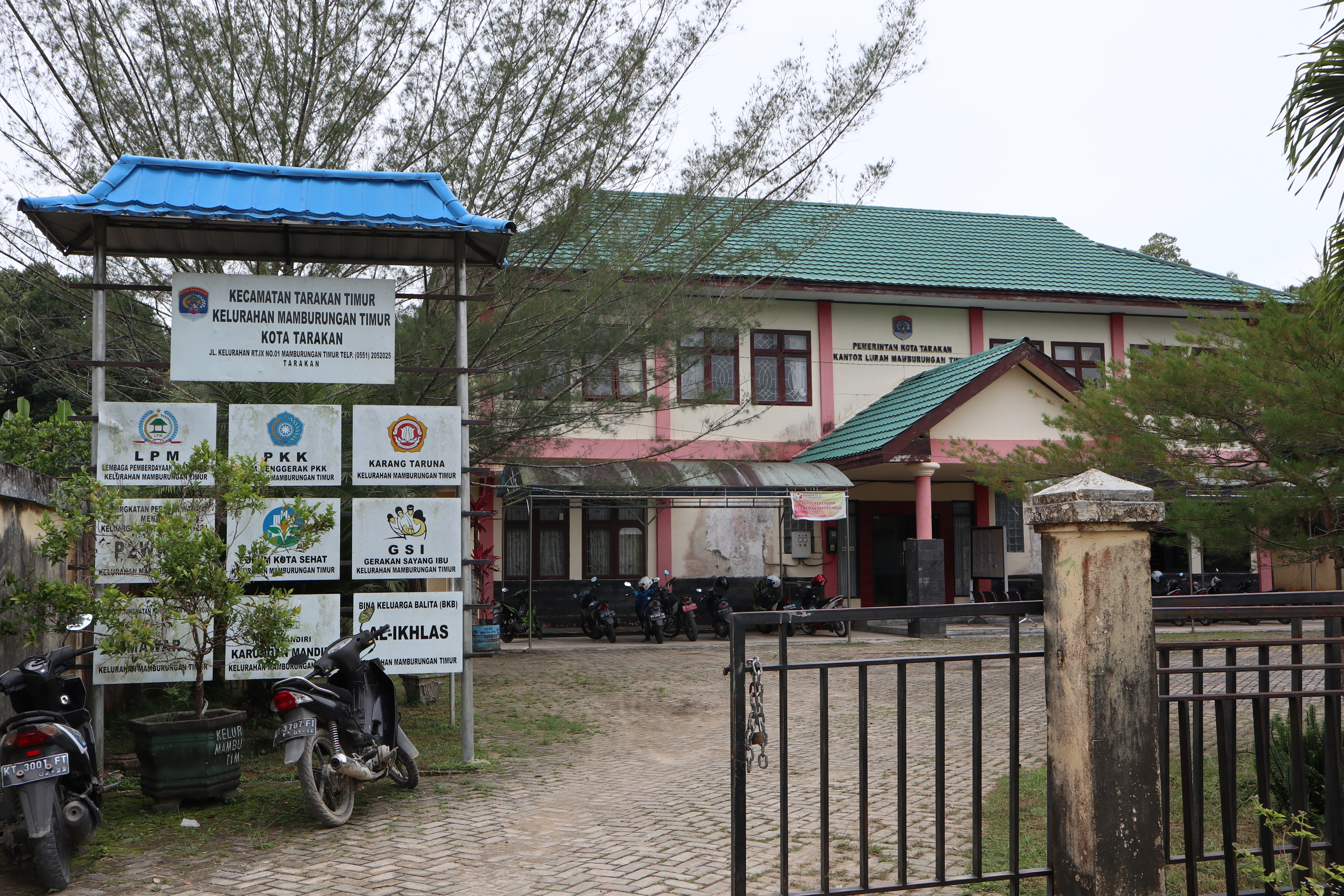
A cungkup built to protect the nameplates at the Mamburungan Timur office, Tarakan

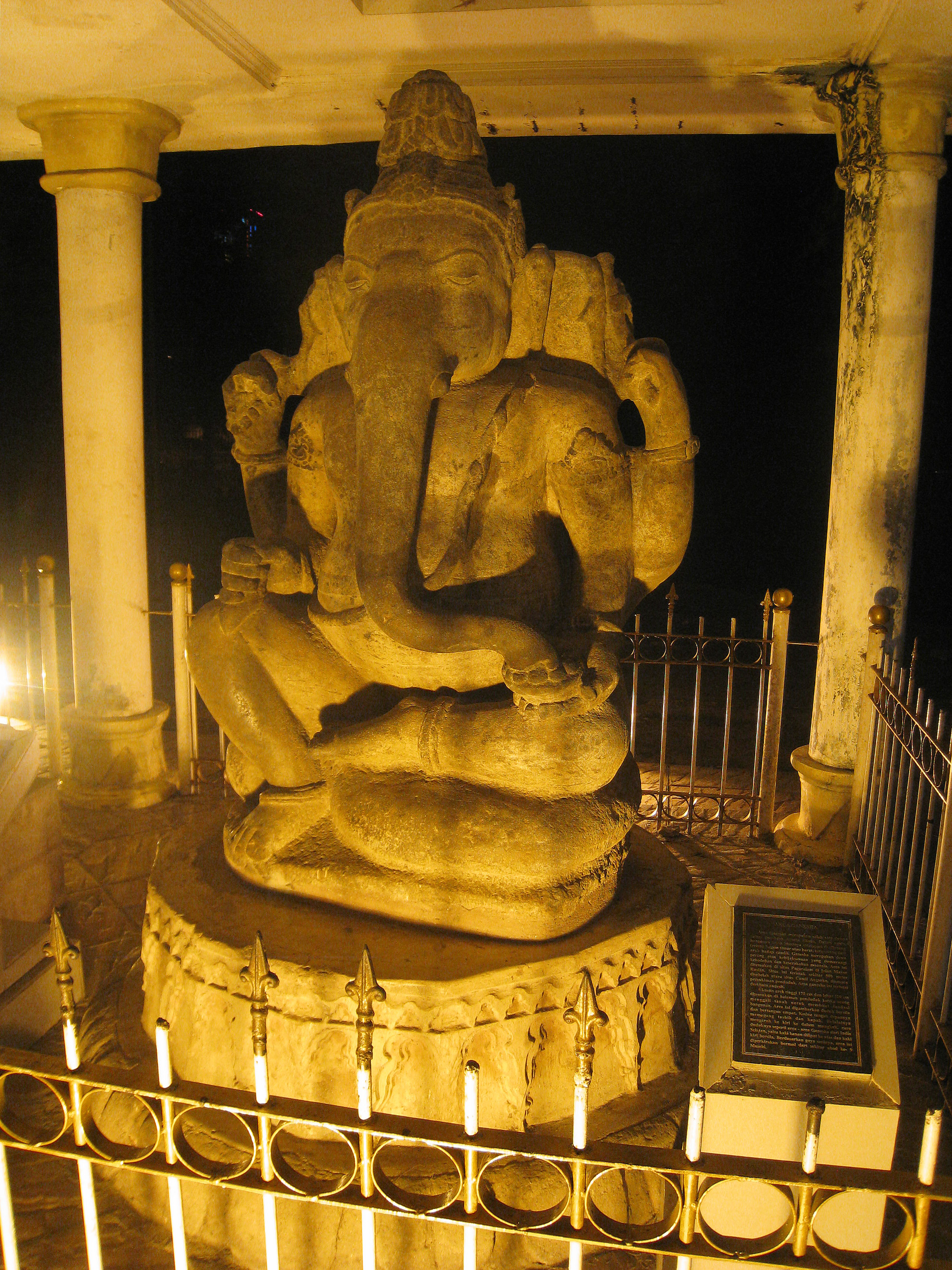
A sculpture of Ganesha protected with a cungkup at the Sultan Mahmud Badaruddin II Museum, Palembang

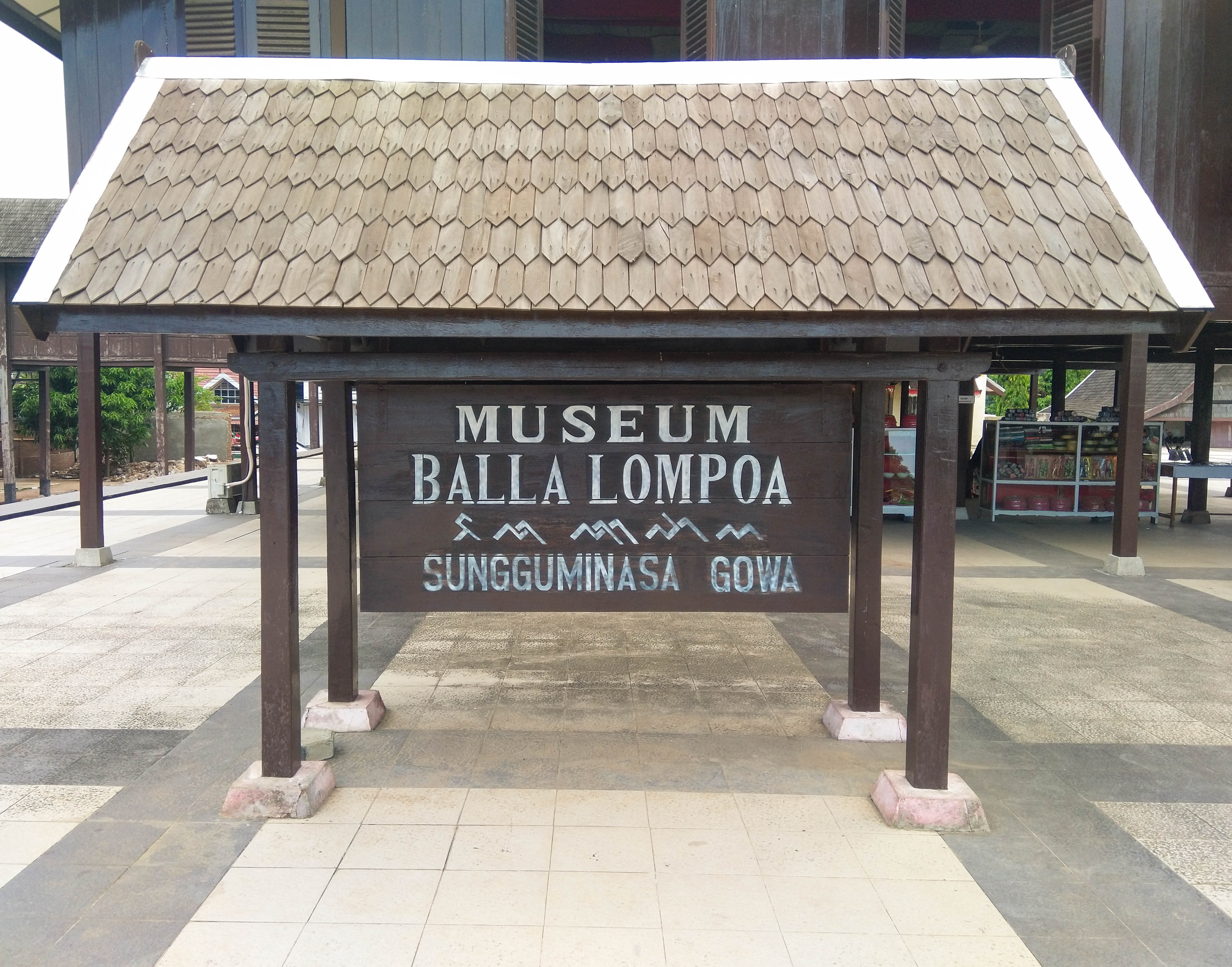
A nameplate protected with a cungkup at the Balla Lompoa museum

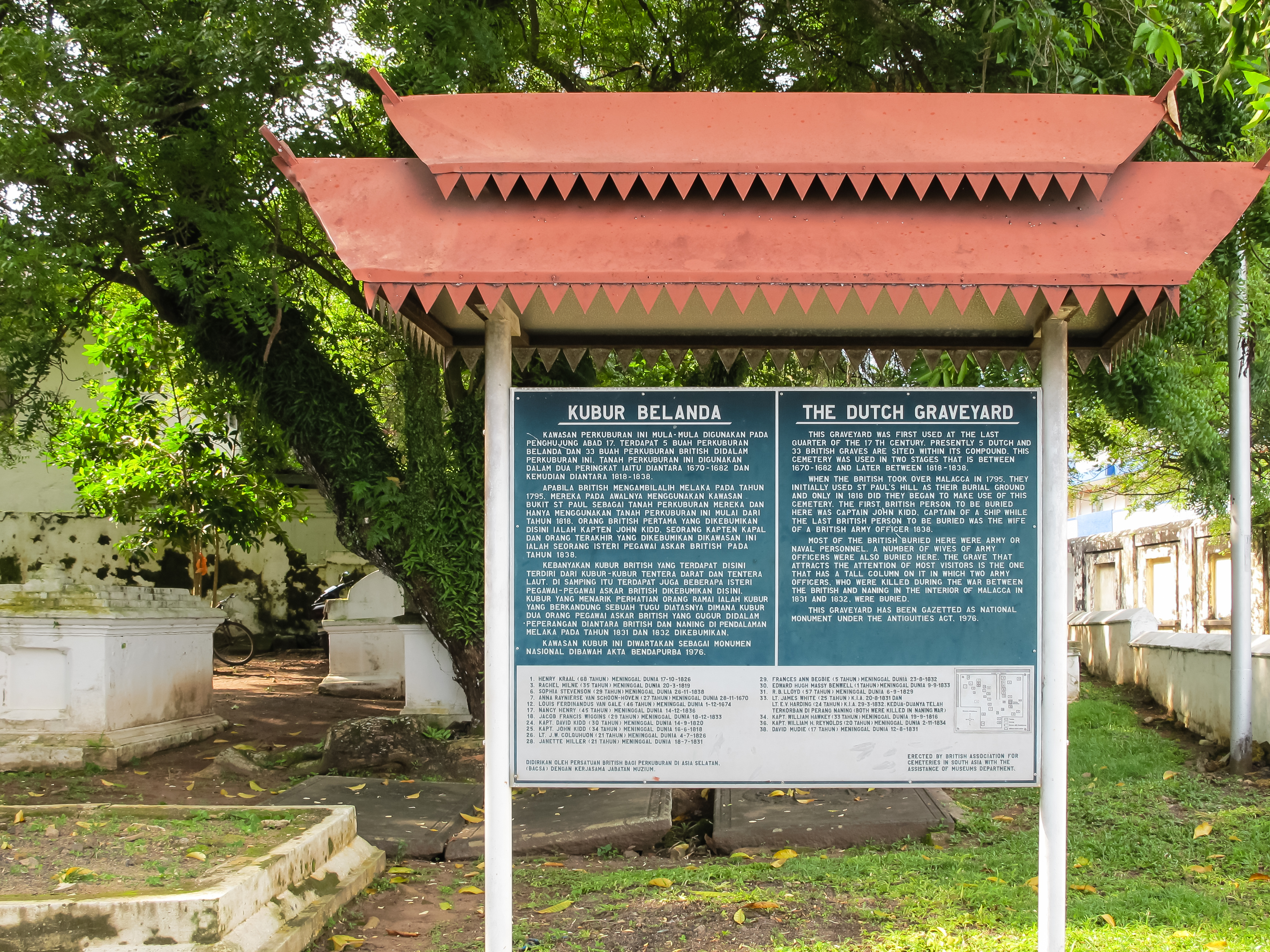
A cungkup for the information board at the Dutch cemetery in Melaka, Malaysia

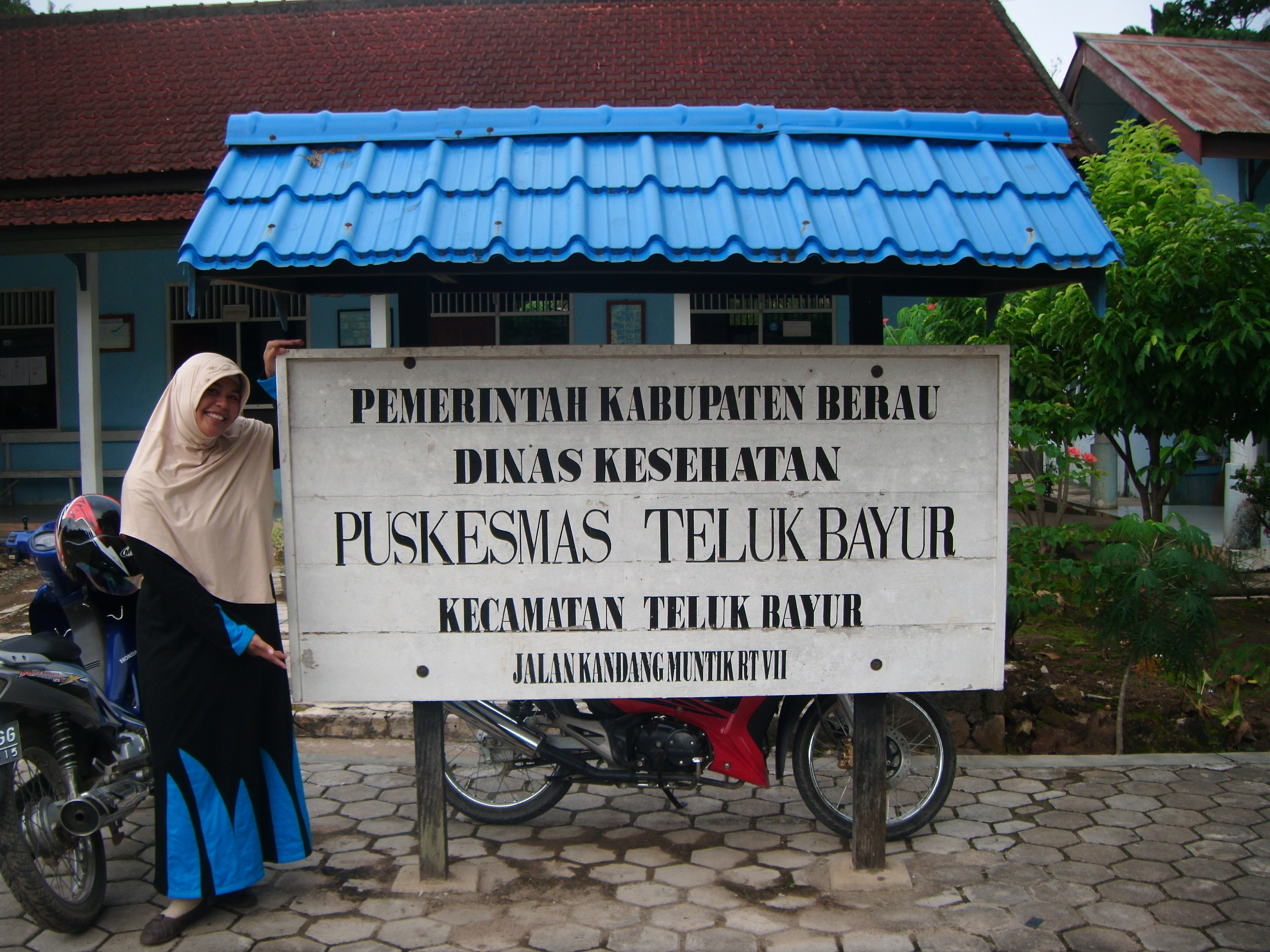
A nameplate for a public health center protected with a cungkup at Teluk Bayur, Berau

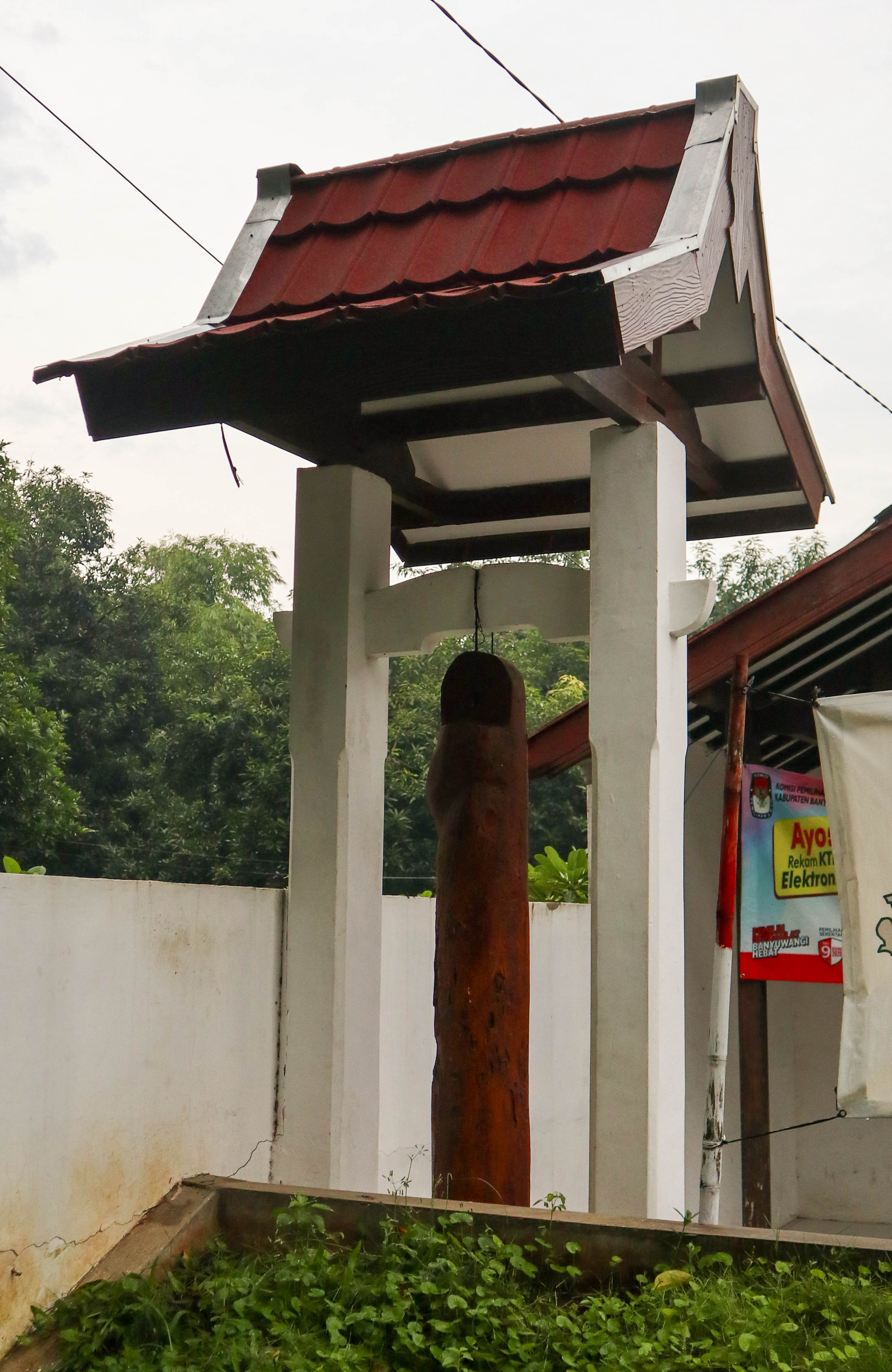
A cungkup at the Kebalenan, Banyuwangi ward office

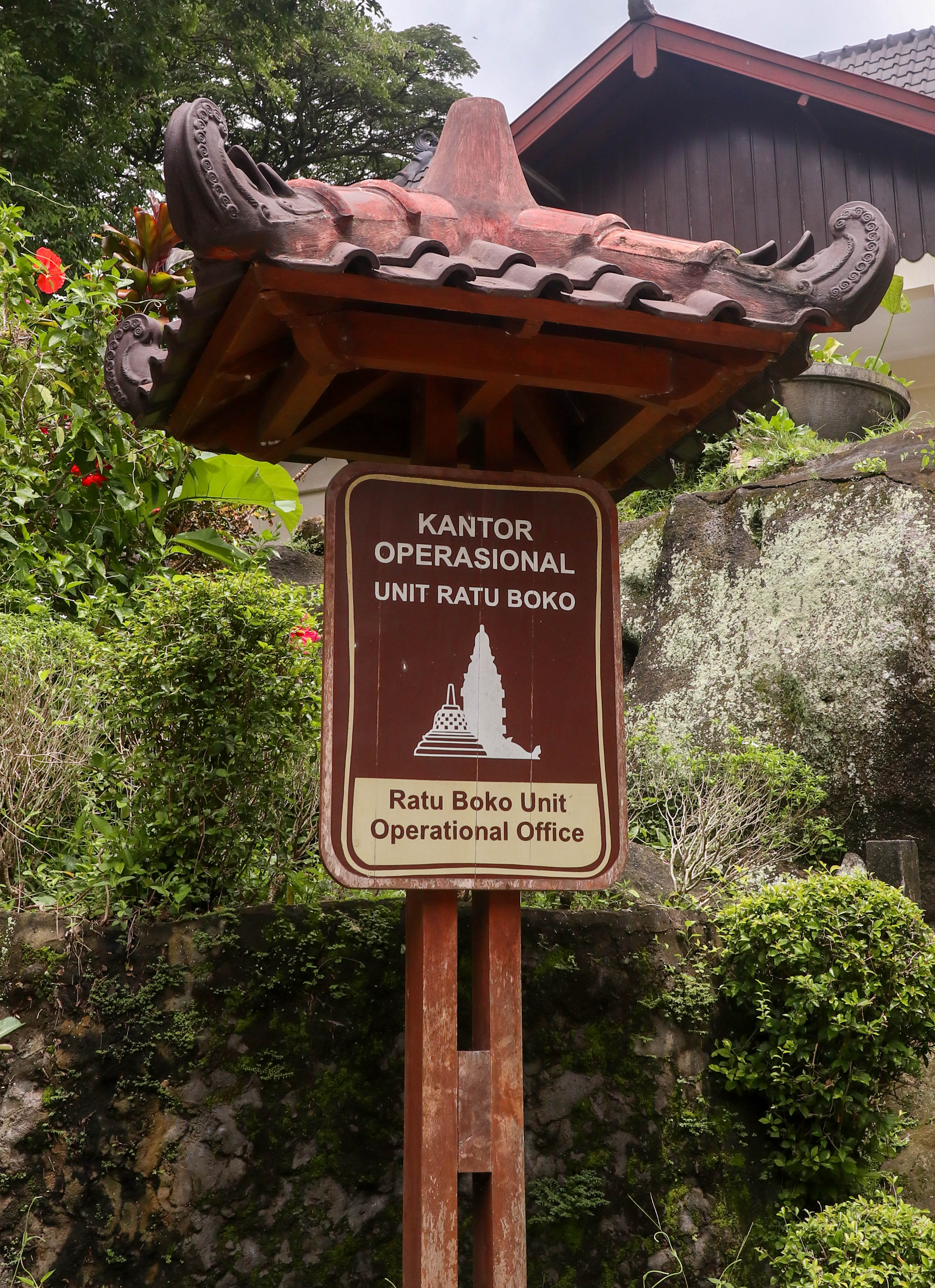
A cungkup protecting an office complex nameplate at Keraton Ratu Boko

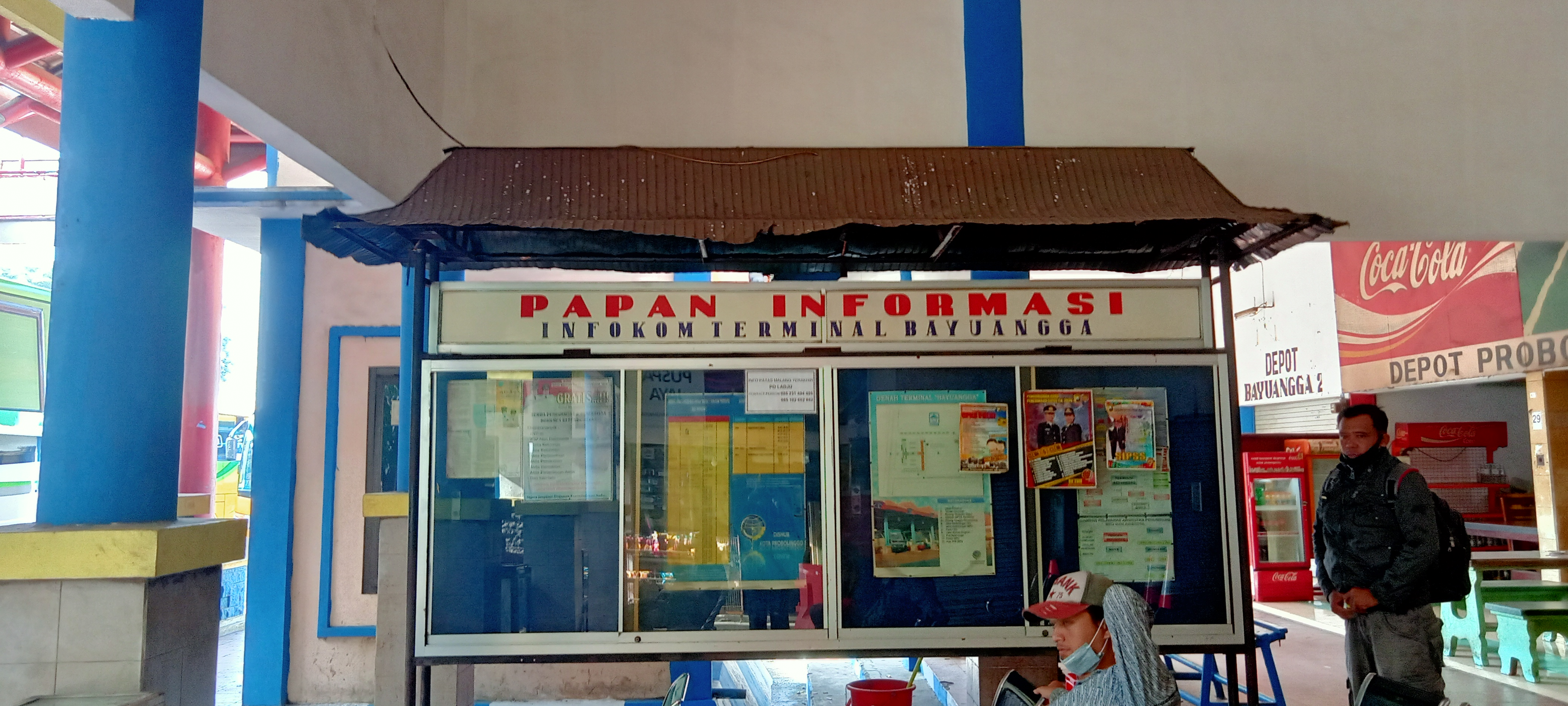
An information board with a cungkup protecting it
