= October 29 =

October 29 this year in various calendars
- Thursday, 29 October 2026
Akan	Kuruyaw
Armenian	11 Trē 1476
Aztec	Atlcahualo 7, 7 Xōchitl
Babylonian	16 Tashritu, 2337 SE
Balinese pawukon	Menga, Pasah, Laba, Wage, Paniron, Wraspati of Watugunung, Brahma, Urungan, Suka
Bengali	13 Kartik, BS 1433
Chinese	Yang Fire Rat・Legs Mansion; Fire Horse Year, Month 9, Day 20 (Shuangjiang, 9 days until Lidong)
Common Era	29 October 2026 CE
Coptic	19 Paopi, AM 1743
Egyptian	16 Phamenoth, 2775 NE
Ethiopian	19 Ṭeqemt, 2019 Amätä Məhrät
French Republican	Décade I, Septidi de Brumaire de l'Année 235 de la République
Gregorian	29 October, AD 2026
Hebrew	18 Cheshvan, AM 5787
Hindu	Rohiṇi・Varīyas; Solar: 12 Kārtika, 1948 SE; Lunisolar: Caturthī, Kṛishna pakṣa of Āśvina, 2083 VE; Rāudra・5127 KY・1,872,877
Icelandic	Fimmtudagur, 6 Gormánuður 2026
Islamic	17 Jumada al-awwal, AH 1448 (using tabular method)
ISO week date	2026-W44-4
Japanese	19 Nagatsuki, Reiwa 8 (Sōkō, 9 days until Rittō)
Julian	16 October, AD 2026 (AM 7535)
Julian day	2461343
Korean	19 Gaedal, 4359 DE
Maya	13.0.14.1.0; 13 Zac, 7 Ahau
Roman	ante diem XVII Kalendas Novembres, MMDCCLXXIX AUC
Solar Hijri	7 Aban, SH 1405
Tibetan	19 tha skar, me pho rta 2153 or 1772 or 1000

<<	October					>>
Su	Mo	Tu	We	Th	Fr	Sa
				1	2	3
4	5	6	7	8	9	10
11	12	13	14	15	16	17
18	19	20	21	22	23	24
25	26	27	28	29	30	31
2026

October 29 in recent years
2026 (Thursday)
2025 (Wednesday)
2024 (Tuesday)
2023 (Sunday)
2022 (Saturday)
2021 (Friday)
2020 (Thursday)
2019 (Tuesday)
2018 (Monday)
2017 (Sunday)

October 29 is the 302nd day of the year (303rd in leap years) in the Gregorian calendar; 63 days remain until the end of the year.

== Events ==
=== Pre-1600 ===
- 312 – Constantine the Great enters Rome after his victory at the Battle of the Milvian Bridge, stages a grand adventus in the city, and is met with popular jubilation. Maxentius' body is fished out of the Tiber and beheaded.
- 437 – Valentinian III, Western Roman Emperor, marries Licinia Eudoxia, daughter of his cousin Theodosius II, Eastern Roman Emperor in Constantinople unifying the two branches of the House of Theodosius.
- 1268 – Conradin, the last Hohenstaufen king, is executed at Naples.
- 1281 – The Mamluk Sultanate defeats the Ilkhanate in the second battle of Homs.
- 1390 – First trial for witchcraft in Paris leading to the death of three people.
- 1467 – Battle of Brustem: Charles the Bold defeats Prince-Bishopric of Liège.

=== 1601–1900 ===
- 1611 – Russian homage to the King of Poland, Sigismund III Vasa.
- 1621 – The London Pageant of 1621 celebrates the inauguration of Edward Barkham (Lord Mayor).
- 1658 – Second Northern War: Naval forces of the Dutch Republic defeat the Swedes in the Battle of the Sound.
- 1665 – Portuguese forces defeat the Kingdom of Kongo and decapitate King António I of Kongo, also known as Nvita a Nkanga.
- 1675 – Leibniz makes the first use of the long s (∫) as a symbol of the integral in calculus.
- 1792 – Mount Hood (Oregon) is named after Samuel Hood, 1st Viscount Hood by Lt. William E. Broughton who sighted the mountain near the mouth of the Willamette River.
- 1863 – Eighteen countries meet in Geneva and agree to form the International Red Cross.
- 1863 – American Civil War: Battle of Wauhatchie: Forces under Union General Ulysses S. Grant repel a Confederate attack led by General James Longstreet in one of the few night battles of the war, protecting the Union's recently opened supply line into Chattanooga, Tennessee.
- 1888 – The Convention of Constantinople is signed, guaranteeing free maritime passage through the Suez Canal during war and peace.

=== 1901–present ===
- 1914 – World War I : the Ottoman Empire enters the war on the side of the Central Powers.
- 1918 – World War I: the German High Seas Fleet is incapacitated when sailors mutiny, an action which would trigger the German Revolution of 1918–19.
- 1923 – Turkey becomes a republic following the dissolution of the Ottoman Empire.
- 1929 – Black Tuesday: The New York Stock Exchange crashes, ending the Great Bull Market of the 1920s and eventually contributing to the Great Depression.
- 1941 – The Holocaust: In the Kaunas Ghetto, over 10,000 Jews are shot by German occupiers at the Ninth Fort, a massacre known as the "Great Action".
- 1944 – World War II: The Dutch city of Breda is liberated by 1st Polish Armoured Division.
- 1944 – World War II: The Soviet Red Army enters Hungary.
- 1948 – Israeli-Palestinian conflict: Safsaf massacre: Israeli soldiers capture the Palestinian village of Safsaf in the Galilee; afterwards, between 52 and 64 villagers are massacred by the IDF.
- 1953 – BCPA Flight 304, a DC-6, crashes near San Francisco.
- 1955 – The Soviet battleship Novorossiysk sinks after probably striking a World War II mine in the harbor at Sevastopol, with a loss of more than 600 sailors.
- 1956 – Suez Crisis begins: Israeli forces invade the Sinai Peninsula and push Egyptian forces back toward the Suez Canal.
- 1957 – Israel's prime minister David Ben-Gurion and five of his ministers are injured when Moshe Dwek throws a grenade into the Knesset.
- 1960 – An airplane carrying the Cal Poly football team crashes on takeoff in Toledo, Ohio.
- 1964 – The United Republic of Tanganyika and Zanzibar is renamed to the United Republic of Tanzania.
- 1964 – Biggest jewel heist in American history when Murph the Surf and gang burgle the American Museum of Natural History stealing the Star of India and other gems.
- 1967 – Montreal's World Fair, Expo 67, closes with over 50 million visitors.
- 1969 – The first-ever computer-to-computer link is established on ARPANET, the precursor to the Internet.
- 1972 – The three surviving perpetrators of the Munich massacre are released from prison in exchange for the hostages of the hijacked Lufthansa Flight 615.
- 1980 – Demonstration flight of a secretly modified C-130 for an Iran hostage crisis rescue attempt ends in a crash landing at Eglin Air Force Base's Duke Field, Florida, leading to the cancellation of Operation Credible Sport.
- 1985 – Major General Samuel K. Doe is announced as the winner of the first multi-party election in Liberia.
- 1986 – British Prime Minister Margaret Thatcher opens the last stretch of the M25 motorway.
- 1991 – The American Galileo spacecraft makes its closest approach to 951 Gaspra, becoming the first probe to visit an asteroid.
- 1994 – Francisco Martin Duran fires over two dozen shots at the White House; he is later convicted of trying to kill U.S. President Bill Clinton.
- 1998 – In South Africa, the Truth and Reconciliation Commission presents its report, which condemns both sides for committing atrocities.
- 1998 – Space Shuttle Discovery blasts off on STS-95 with 77-year-old John Glenn on board, making him the oldest person to go into space at that time.
- 1998 – ATSC HDTV broadcasting in the United States is inaugurated with live coverage of the launch of the STS-95 space shuttle mission.
- 1998 – Hurricane Mitch, the second deadliest Atlantic hurricane in history, makes landfall in Honduras.
- 1998 – The Gothenburg discothèque fire in Sweden kills 63 and injures over 200.
- 1999 – A large cyclone devastates Odisha, India.
- 2002 – A fire destroys a luxurious department store in Ho Chi Minh City, where 1,500 people are shopping. More than 60 people die and over 100 are unaccounted for in the deadliest peacetime disaster in Vietnam.
- 2004 – The Arabic-language news network Al Jazeera broadcasts an excerpt from a 2004 Osama bin Laden video in which the terrorist leader first admits direct responsibility for the September 11, 2001 attacks and references the 2004 U.S. presidential election.
- 2005 – Bombings in Delhi, India kill 67 and injure over 200 people.
- 2006 – ADC Airlines Flight 053 crashes after takeoff from Nnamdi Azikiwe International Airport in Abuja, Nigeria killing 96 people and injuring nine.
- 2008 – Delta Air Lines merges with Northwest Airlines, creating the world's largest airline and reducing the number of US legacy carriers to five.
- 2008 – A pair of deadly earthquakes hits Baluchistan, Pakistan, killing 215.
- 2012 – Hurricane Sandy hits the east coast of the United States, killing hundreds, while leaving nearly $70 billion in damages and causing major power outages.
- 2014 – A mud slide; the 2014 Badulla landslide, in south-central Sri Lanka, kills at least 16 people, and leaves hundreds of people missing.
- 2015 – China announces the end of its one-child policy after 35 years.
- 2018 – Lion Air Flight 610, a Boeing 737 MAX, crashes after taking off from Jakarta, Indonesia killing 189 people on board. This is the first of two crashes that will lead to the plane being grounded worldwide.
- 2020 – Jeremy Corbyn, former Leader of the Labour Party and of the Opposition in the United Kingdom is suspended from the Labour Party following his response to findings from the EHRC on the issue of antisemitism within the party.
- 2022 – At least 156 die at a crowd crush during a Halloween celebration in Itaewon district, Seoul, South Korea.
- 2022 – At least 100 people are killed and over 300 are injured by a double car bombing in Mogadishu, Somalia.
- 2026 – US$6.3 billion is stolen from cryptocurrency exchange Binance.

== Births ==
=== Pre-1600 ===
- 1463 – Alessandro Achillini, Italian physician and philosopher (died 1512)
- 1497 – Benedetto Accolti the Younger, Italian cardinal (died 1549)
- 1504 – Shin Saimdang, South Korean painter and poet (died 1551)
- 1507 – Fernando Alvarez de Toledo, Spanish general (died 1582)
- 1550 – Laura Guidiccioni, Italian noblewoman and poet (died 1597/9)
- 1562 – George Abbot, English archbishop and academic (died 1633)

=== 1601–1900 ===
- 1682 – Pierre François Xavier de Charlevoix, French historian, explorer, and author (died 1761)
- 1690 – Martin Folkes, English mathematician and astronomer (died 1754)
- 1704 – John Byng, English admiral and politician, 11th Commodore Governor of Newfoundland (died 1757)
- 1711 – Laura Bassi, Italian physicist and academic, first woman to have doctorate in science (died 1778)
- 1740 – James Boswell, Scottish lawyer and author (died 1795)
- 1808 – Caterina Scarpellini, Italian astronomer and meteorologist (died 1873)
- 1812 – Louise Granberg, Swedish playwright (died 1907)
- 1815 – Dan Emmett, American composer (died 1904)
- 1822 – Mieczysław Halka-Ledóchowski, Russian-Polish cardinal (died 1902)
- 1831 – James Boucaut, English-Australian politician, 11th Premier of South Australia (died 1916)
- 1832 – Narcisa de Jesús, Ecuadorian saint (died 1869)
- 1837 – Harriet Powers, American folk artist and quilter (died 1910)
- 1855 – Paul Bruchési, Canadian archbishop (died 1939)
- 1855 – Paul-Jacques Curie, French physicist and academic (died 1941)
- 1861 – Andrei Ryabushkin, Russian painter (died 1904)
- 1866 – Antonio Luna, Filipino general and politician (died 1899)
- 1866 – Carl Gustav Witt, German astronomer (died 1946)
- 1875 – Marie of Romania (died 1938)
- 1877 – Narcisa de Leon, Filipino film producer (died 1966)
- 1877 – Wilfred Rhodes, English cricketer and coach (died 1973)
- 1879 – Alva B. Adams, American lawyer and politician (died 1941)
- 1879 – Franz von Papen, German soldier and politician, Chancellor of Germany (died 1969)
- 1880 – Abram Ioffe, Russian physicist and academic (died 1960)
- 1881 – John DeWitt, American football player and hammer thrower (died 1930)
- 1882 – Jean Giraudoux, French author and playwright (died 1944)
- 1883 – Victor Hochepied, French swimmer and water polo player (died 1966)
- 1891 – Fanny Brice, American actress and singer (died 1951)
- 1897 – Joseph Goebbels, German lawyer and politician, Chancellor of Nazi Germany (died 1945)
- 1897 – Billy Walker, English footballer (died 1964)
- 1898 – Alan Barker, English soldier (died 1984)
- 1899 – Akim Tamiroff, Georgian-American actor (died 1972)

=== 1901–present ===
- 1901 – Émilienne Morin, French activist (died 1991)
- 1905 – Henry Green, English author (died 1973)
- 1906 – Fredric Brown, American author (died 1972)
- 1907 – Edwige Feuillère, French actress (died 1998)
- 1910 – A. J. Ayer, English philosopher and author (died 1989)
- 1913 – Al Suomi, American ice hockey player and referee (died 2014)
- 1914 – Maxim of Bulgaria, Bulgarian patriarch (died 2012)
- 1915 – William Berenberg, American physician and academic (died 2005)
- 1918 – Bernard Gordon, American screenwriter and producer (died 2007)
- 1918 – Diana Serra Cary, American actress and author (died 2020)
- 1920 – Baruj Benacerraf, Venezuelan-American physician and immunologist, Nobel Prize laureate (died 2011)
- 1920 – Václav Neumann, Czech violinist and conductor (died 1995)
- 1921 – Baselios Thoma Didymos I, Indian metropolitan (died 2014)
- 1921 – Baku Mahadeva, Sri Lankan civil servant and academic (died 2013)
- 1921 – Bill Mauldin, American soldier and cartoonist (died 2003)
- 1922 – Neal Hefti, American trumpet player and composer (died 2008)
- 1923 – Carl Djerassi, Austrian-American chemist, author, and playwright (died 2015)
- 1923 – Gerda van der Kade-Koudijs, Dutch runner, hurdler, and long jumper (died 2015)
- 1924 – Bernard Middleton, British restoration bookbinder (died 2019)
- 1925 – Dominick Dunne, American journalist and author (died 2009)
- 1925 – Robert Hardy, English actor (died 2017)
- 1925 – Haim Hefer, Polish-Israeli songwriter and poet (died 2012)
- 1925 – Klaus Roth, British mathematician (died 2015)
- 1925 – Zoot Sims, American saxophonist and composer (died 1985)
- 1926 – Necmettin Erbakan, Turkish engineer and politician, 23rd Prime Minister of Turkey (died 2011)
- 1926 – Jon Vickers, Canadian tenor and actor (died 2015)
- 1927 – Frank Sedgman, Australian tennis player
- 1929 – Yevgeny Primakov, Ukrainian-Russian journalist and politician, 32nd Prime Minister of Russia (died 2015)
- 1930 – Bertha Brouwer, Dutch sprinter (died 2006)
- 1930 – Niki de Saint Phalle, French sculptor and painter (died 2002)
- 1930 – Omara Portuondo, Cuban singer and dancer
- 1930 – Natalie Sleeth, American pianist and composer (died 1992)
- 1932 – Dick Garmaker, American basketball player (died 2020)
- 1932 – Joyce Gould, Baroness Gould of Potternewton, English pharmacist and politician
- 1933 – William Harrison, American author and screenwriter (died 2013)
- 1935 – David Allen, English cricketer (died 2014)
- 1935 – Eddie Hopkinson, English footballer (died 2004)
- 1935 – Michael Jayston, English actor (died 2024)
- 1935 – Isao Takahata, Japanese director (died 2018)
- 1937 – Sonny Osborne, American bluegrass singer and banjo player (died 2021)
- 1938 – Ralph Bakshi, American director, producer, and screenwriter
- 1938 – Ellen Johnson Sirleaf, Liberian politician, President of Liberia, Nobel Prize laureate
- 1938 – Peter Stampfel, American fiddle player, violinist, and singer-songwriter
- 1940 – Connie Mack III, American lawyer and politician
- 1940 – Jack Shepherd, English actor, director, and playwright (died 2025)
- 1940 – Galen Weston, English-Canadian businessman and philanthropist, founded George Weston Limited (died 2021)
- 1941 – George Davies, English fashion designer
- 1941 – Paul Tyler, Baron Tyler, English politician
- 1942 – Lee Clayton, American rock/country musician and songwriter (died 2023)
- 1942 – Bob Ross, American painter and television host (died 1995)
- 1943 – Don Simpson, American actor, producer, and screenwriter (died 1996)
- 1944 – Claude Brochu, Canadian businessman
- 1944 – Mehmet Haberal, Turkish surgeon and academic
- 1944 – Denny Laine, English singer-songwriter and musician (died 2023)
- 1944 – Robbie van Leeuwen, Dutch musician and songwriter
- 1945 – Mick Gallagher, English keyboard player and songwriter
- 1945 – Ron Maag, American businessman and politician
- 1945 – Melba Moore, American singer-songwriter and actress
- 1945 – Gerrit Ybema, Dutch civil servant and politician (died 2012)
- 1946 – Peter Green, English singer-songwriter and guitarist (died 2020)
- 1947 – Helen Coonan, Australian lawyer and politician, 52nd Australian Minister for Communications
- 1947 – Richard Dreyfuss, American actor and activist
- 1948 – Frans de Waal, Dutch-American ethologist, author, and academic (died 2024)
- 1948 – Kate Jackson, American actress, director, and producer
- 1949 – Kieron Baker, English footballer
- 1949 – Raphael Carl Lee, American surgeon and academic
- 1949 – Paul Orndorff, American football player and wrestler (died 2021)
- 1949 – David Paton, Scottish guitarist
- 1949 – James Williamson, American guitarist, songwriter, and producer
- 1950 – Abdullah Gül, Turkish academic and politician, 11th President of Turkey
- 1951 – Dirk Kempthorne, American businessman and politician, 49th United States Secretary of the Interior (died 2026)
- 1951 – Tiff Needell, English race car driver and television host
- 1952 – Marcia Fudge, American lawyer and politician
- 1953 – Denis Potvin, Canadian ice hockey player and sportscaster
- 1955 – Kevin DuBrow, American heavy metal singer-songwriter (died 2007)
- 1956 – Wilfredo Gómez, Puerto Rican-American boxer (died 2026)
- 1957 – Dan Castellaneta, American actor, voice artist, comedian, singer and producer
- 1958 – Blažej Baláž, Slovak painter, sculptor, and illustrator
- 1958 – David Remnick, American journalist and author
- 1958 – Danny Vranes, American basketball player
- 1959 – Jesse Barfield, American baseball player and coach
- 1959 – Mike Gartner, Canadian ice hockey player and coach
- 1959 – Finola Hughes, English actress
- 1959 – John Magufuli, Tanzanian politician, 5th President of Tanzania (died 2021)
- 1960 – Michael Carter, American football player and athlete
- 1960 – Fabiola Gianotti, Italian physicist and academic
- 1960 – Thorsten Schlumberger, German footballer
- 1961 – Randy Jackson, American singer-songwriter and dancer
- 1961 – Joel Otto, American ice hockey player and coach
- 1962 – Einar Örn Benediktsson, Icelandic singer, trumpet player, and politician
- 1963 – Damian Chapa, American actor
- 1963 – Gerald Morris, American author
- 1964 – Yasmin Le Bon, English model
- 1964 – Eddie McGuire, Australian businessman and television host
- 1965 – Tyler Collins, American singer-songwriter and actress
- 1965 – Andrew Ettingshausen, Australian rugby league player and television host
- 1965 – Michael Passons, American singer-songwriter
- 1966 – Mary Bucholtz, American linguist and academic
- 1967 – Beth Chapman, American reality television star (died 2019)
- 1967 – Thorsten Fink, German footballer and manager
- 1967 – Joely Fisher, American actress and director
- 1967 – Rufus Sewell, English actor
- 1968 – Johann Olav Koss, Norwegian speed skater and physician
- 1969 – David Farr, English director and playwright
- 1969 – Chris Verene, American photographer
- 1970 – Phillip Cocu, Dutch footballer and manager
- 1970 – Dan Ratushny, Canadian ice hockey player and coach and lawyer
- 1970 – Kaido Reivelt, Estonian physicist and academic
- 1970 – Toby Smith, English keyboardist and songwriter (died 2017)
- 1970 – Edwin van der Sar, Dutch footballer and sportscaster
- 1971 – Daniel J. Bernstein, American mathematician, cryptologist, and academic
- 1971 – Greg Blewett, Australian cricketer, coach, and sportscaster
- 1971 – Matthew Hayden, Australian cricketer
- 1971 – Winona Ryder, American actress and producer
- 1972 – Tracee Ellis Ross, American actress and producer
- 1972 – Takafumi Horie, Japanese businessman, founded Livedoor
- 1972 – Gabrielle Union, American actress and producer
- 1973 – Vonetta Flowers, American bobsledder, sprinter, and long jumper
- 1973 – Éric Messier, Canadian ice hockey player
- 1973 – Robert Pires, French footballer
- 1974 – R. A. Dickey, American baseball player
- 1974 – Michael Vaughan, English cricketer and sportscaster
- 1974 – Yenny Wahid, Indonesian activist and politician
- 1975 – Baba Ali, Iranian-American comedian, games developer, businessman, and actor
- 1975 – Joy Osmanski, American actress
- 1976 – Stephen Craigan, Irish footballer and manager
- 1976 – Milena Govich, American actress, singer, and dancer
- 1976 – Raghava Lawrence, Indian actor, director, and choreographer
- 1976 – Mark Sheehan, Irish guitarist (died 2023)
- 1977 – Jon Abrahams, American actor
- 1977 – Brendan Fehr, Canadian actor
- 1978 – Travis Henry, American football player
- 1978 – Kelly Smith, English footballer
- 1979 – Ignasi Giménez Renom, Catalan lawyer and politician
- 1979 – Andrew-Lee Potts, English actor, director, and producer
- 1980 – Ben Foster, American actor
- 1980 – Kaine Robertson, New Zealand-Italian rugby player
- 1981 – Amanda Beard, American swimmer
- 1981 – Jonathan Brown, Australian footballer
- 1981 – Angelika dela Cruz, Filipino actress and singer
- 1982 – Ariel Lin, Taiwanese actress and singer
- 1982 – Ahmed al-Sharaa, Syrian revolutionary and military leader, President of Syria
- 1983 – Richard Brancatisano, Australian actor
- 1983 – Maurice Clarett, American football player
- 1983 – Freddy Eastwood, Welsh footballer
- 1983 – Jérémy Mathieu, French footballer
- 1983 – Nurcan Taylan, Turkish weightlifter
- 1984 – Chris Baio, American bass player
- 1984 – Lee Chung-ah, South Korean actress
- 1984 – Eric Staal, Canadian ice hockey player
- 1985 – Cal Crutchlow, English motorcycle racer
- 1985 – Ximena Sariñana, Mexican singer-songwriter and actress
- 1985 – Vijender Singh, Indian boxer
- 1986 – Italia Ricci, Canadian actress
- 1987 – Andy Dalton, American football player
- 1987 – Jessica Dubé, Canadian figure skater
- 1987 – Tove Lo, Swedish singer
- 1987 – Makoto Ogawa, Japanese singer and actress
- 1988 – Janoris Jenkins, American football player
- 1989 – Irina Karamanos, Chilean anthropologist and political scientist, First Lady of Chile
- 1989 – Primož Roglič, Slovenian ski jumper and cyclist
- 1990 – Ender Inciarte, Venezuelan baseball player
- 1990 – Ben Proudfoot, Canadian filmmaker
- 1990 – Eric Saade, Swedish singer
- 1991 – Parris Goebel, New Zealand dancer and choreographer
- 1991 – Nikita Zaitsev, Russian ice hockey player
- 1992 – Evan Fournier, French basketball player
- 1992 – Colin Miller, Canadian ice hockey player
- 1993 – Ágnes Bukta, Hungarian tennis player
- 1993 – India Eisley, American actress
- 1994 – Danielle Hunter, American football player
- 1996 – Vince Dunn, Canadian ice hockey player
- 1996 – Mikko Rantanen, Finnish ice hockey player
- 1996 – Astrid S, Norwegian singer and songwriter
- 1998 – Lance Stroll, Canadian racing driver

== Deaths ==
=== Pre-1600 ===
- 1050 – Eadsige, archbishop of Canterbury
- 1266 – Margaret of Austria, Queen of Bohemia (born 1204)
- 1268 – Conradin, King of Sicily (born 1252)
- 1268 – Frederick I, Margrave of Baden (born 1249)
- 1321 – Stefan Milutin, King of Serbia (born 1253)
- 1339 – Aleksandr Mikhailovich of Tver, Grand Prince of Vladimir (born 1301)
- 1590 – Dirck Coornhert, Dutch philosopher, theologian, and politician (born 1522)

=== 1601–1900 ===
- 1618 – Walter Raleigh, English admiral, explorer, and politician, Lieutenant Governor of Jersey (born 1554)
- 1650 – David Calderwood, Scottish historian and theologian (born 1575)
- 1666 – Edmund Calamy the Elder, English minister and activist (born 1600)
- 1666 – James Shirley, English dramatist (born 1596)
- 1783 – Jean le Rond d'Alembert, French mathematician, physicist, and philosopher (born 1717)
- 1796 – Charles Lynch, American politician and namesake of lynching (born 1736)
- 1804 – Sarah Crosby, English Methodist preacher (born 1729)
- 1829 – Maria Anna Mozart, Austrian pianist (born 1751)
- 1871 – Andrea Debono, Maltese trader and explorer (born 1821)
- 1877 – Nathan Bedford Forrest, American general and KKK leader (born 1821)
- 1892 – William Harnett, American painter (born 1848)
- 1897 – Henry George, American journalist, philosopher, and economist (born 1839)
- 1900 – Fatima Cates, British Muslim convert and activist (born 1865)

=== 1901–present ===
- 1901 – Leon Czolgosz, American assassin of William McKinley (born 1873)
- 1905 – Étienne Desmarteau, Canadian weight thrower and shot putter (born 1873)
- 1911 – Joseph Pulitzer, Hungarian-American publisher, lawyer, and politician, founded Pulitzer, Inc. (born 1847)
- 1916 – John Sebastian Little, American lawyer and politician, 21st Governor of Arkansas (born 1851)
- 1918 – Rudolf Tobias, Estonian-German organist and composer (born 1873)
- 1919 – Albert Benjamin Simpson, Canadian preacher, theologian, and author, founded the Christian and Missionary Alliance (born 1843)
- 1924 – Frances Hodgson Burnett, English-American novelist and playwright (born 1849)
- 1932 – Joseph Babinski, French neurologist and academic (born 1857)
- 1933 – Albert Calmette, French physician, bacteriologist, and immunologist (born 1863)
- 1933 – George Luks, American painter and illustrator (born 1867)
- 1933 – Paul Painlevé, French mathematician and politician, 84th Prime Minister of France (born 1853)
- 1936 – Ramiro de Maeztu, Spanish journalist and theorist (born 1874)
- 1939 – Dwight B. Waldo, American historian and academic (born 1864)
- 1941 – Harvey Hendrick, American baseball player (born 1897)
- 1942 – Edward S. Anthoine, American politician and lawyer (born 1882)
- 1949 – George Gurdjieff, Armenian-French monk, psychologist, and philosopher (born 1872)
- 1949 – Thomas Slater Price, British chemist (born 1875)
- 1950 – Gustaf V of Sweden (born 1858)
- 1951 – Robert Grant Aitken, American astronomer (born 1864)
- 1953 – William Kapell, American pianist (born 1922)
- 1956 – Louis Rosier, French race car driver (born 1905)
- 1957 – Louis B. Mayer, Belarusian-American production manager and producer (born 1885)
- 1958 – Zoë Akins, American author, poet, and playwright (born 1886)
- 1961 – Astrid Holm, Danish actress (born 1893)
- 1963 – Adolphe Menjou, American actor (born 1890)
- 1971 – Duane Allman, American singer-songwriter and guitarist (born 1946)
- 1971 – Arne Tiselius, Swedish biochemist and academic, Nobel Prize laureate (born 1902)
- 1975 – Edmund Hirst, British chemist (born 1898)
- 1977 – Chiyonoyama Masanobu, Japanese sumo wrestler, the 41st Yokozuna (born 1926)
- 1980 – Giorgio Borġ Olivier, Maltese lawyer and politician, 7th Prime Minister of Malta (born 1911)
- 1981 – Georges Brassens, French singer-songwriter and guitarist (born 1921)
- 1985 – Evgeny Lifshitz, Soviet physicist (born 1915)
- 1986 – Mimis Fotopoulos, Greek actor, singer, and academic (born 1913)
- 1987 – Woody Herman, American singer, clarinet player, saxophonist, and bandleader (born 1913)
- 1988 – Kamaladevi Chattopadhyay, Indian author and activist (born 1903)
- 1993 – Lipman Bers, Latvian-American mathematician and academic (born 1914)
- 1994 – Shlomo Goren, Israeli rabbi, general, and scholar (born 1918)
- 1995 – Terry Southern, American novelist, essayist, screenwriter (born 1924)
- 1996 – Eugen Kapp, Estonian composer and educator (born 1908)
- 1997 – Anton LaVey, American occultist, founded the Church of Satan (born 1930)
- 1997 – Andreas Gerasimos Michalitsianos, Greek-American astronomer and astrophysicist (born 1947)
- 1998 – Paul Misraki, Turkish-French pianist and composer (born 1908)
- 1999 – Greg, Belgian author and illustrator (born 1931)
- 2000 – Carlos Guastavino, Argentinian pianist and composer (born 1912)
- 2002 – Glenn McQueen, Canadian-American animator (born 1960)
- 2003 – Hal Clement, American pilot, author, and educator (born 1922)
- 2003 – Franco Corelli, Italian tenor and actor (born 1921)
- 2004 – Princess Alice, Duchess of Gloucester (born 1901)
- 2004 – Admire Vega, Japanese thoroughbred horse (born 1966)
- 2004 – Ordal Demokan, Turkish physicist and academic (born 1946)
- 2004 – Edward Oliver LeBlanc, Dominican lawyer and politician, Premier of Dominica (born 1923)
- 2004 – Peter Twinn, English mathematician and entomologist (born 1916)
- 2005 – Lloyd Bochner, Canadian-American actor (born 1924)
- 2005 – Ion Irimescu, Romanian sculptor and illustrator (born 1903)
- 2008 – Mike Baker, American singer-songwriter (born 1963)
- 2011 – Jimmy Savile, English radio and television host (born 1926)
- 2012 – Letitia Baldrige, American etiquette expert and author (born 1926)
- 2012 – J. Bernlef, Dutch author, poet, and songwriter (born 1937)
- 2012 – Kenneth G. Ryder, American academic (born 1924)
- 2012 – Wallace L. W. Sargent, English-American astronomer and academic (born 1935)
- 2012 – Jack Vaughn, American boxer and diplomat (born 1920)
- 2013 – Jean Rénald Clérismé, Haitian priest and politician, Foreign Minister of Haiti (born 1937)
- 2013 – Sherman Halsey, American director and producer (born 1957)
- 2013 – John Spence, American soldier and engineer (born 1918)
- 2013 – Graham Stark, English actor, director, producer, and screenwriter (born 1922)
- 2014 – Roger Freeman, American lawyer and politician (born 1965)
- 2014 – Klas Ingesson, Swedish footballer and manager (born 1968)
- 2014 – H. Gary Morse, American businessman (born 1936)
- 2015 – Luther Burden, American basketball player and coach (born 1953)
- 2015 – Ernesto Herrera, Filipino businessman and politician (born 1942)
- 2015 – Boris Kristančič, Slovene basketball player and coach (born 1931)
- 2015 – Ranko Žeravica, Serbian basketball player and coach (born 1929)
- 2019 – John Witherspoon, American actor and comedian (born 1942)
- 2020 – Angelika Amon, Austrian-American molecular and cell biologist (born 1967)
- 2021 – Ashley Mallett, Australian cricketer (born 1945)
- 2023 – Hiroshi Morie, Japanese musician and singer-songwriter (born 1968)
- 2024 – Teri Garr, American actress and comedian (born 1944)
- 2026 – Barry Rushworth, Australian rugby league player (born 1941)

== Holidays and observances ==
- Christian feast day:
  - Abraham of Rostov
  - Blessed Chiara Badano
  - Colman mac Duagh
  - Douai Martyrs
  - Gaetano Errico
  - James Hannington (Anglicanism)
  - Michele Rua
  - Narcissus of Jerusalem
  - Theuderius
  - October 29 (Eastern Orthodox liturgics)
- Coronation Day (Cambodia)
- National Cat Day (United States)
- Republic Day (Turkey) or Cumhuriyet Bayramı
