= Mpu Gandring =

Mpu Gandring was a maker of kris, a type of Javanese knife, who lived in Lulumbang during the time of Tumapel when the region was still under the Kediri kingdom. According to the Pararaton, he was killed by Ken Arok and cursed the kris, which later became known as the Keris Mpu Gandring and was linked to Ken Arok and the founding of Singhasari.

He was asked by Ken Arok to make a kris, but when Ken Arok returned after five months, the blade was still being worked on and Mpu Gandring refused to give it because it was not finished. Ken Arok then took the kris by force and stabbed Mpu Gandring with it, and before dying Mpu Gandring said that Ken Arok and seven of his descendants would die by that kris. After this, the Mpu Gandring kris became a weapon used in a chain of killings linked to Ken Arok's rise to power, including the deaths of Tunggul Ametung, Kebo Ijo, Ken Arok, Ki Pengalasan, and Anusapati, while Tohjaya later died during the same conflict. This series of deaths was later remembered as the curse of Mpu Gandring. In modern writing, the story is also used as a moral tale about power and legitimacy, where using a weapon without the consent of its maker leads to the loss of rightful rule.
