= Bar Yohai =

Bar Yohai: בַּר יוֹחַאי (Hebrew)

Hebrew transcription(s)
  - Unofficial: Bar Yochai
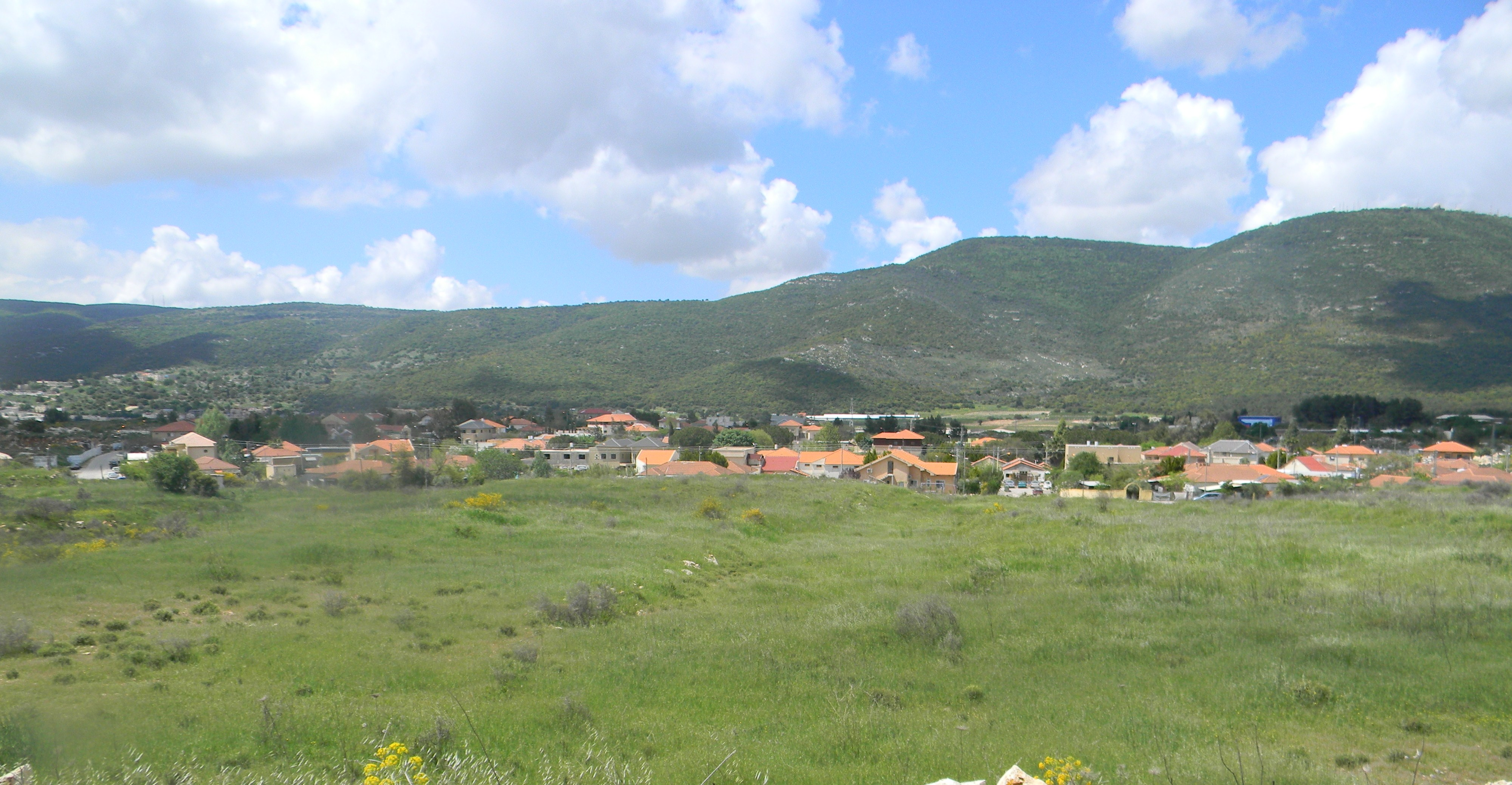
- Etymology: Simeon bar Yochai
- Location within Northeast Israel
- Coordinates: 32°59′52″N 35°26′56″E
- Country: Israel
- District: Northern
- Subdistrict: Safed
- Council: Merom HaGalil
- Founded: 1977
- Founder: Soviet immigrants
- Population (2024): 1,173

Bar Yohai (Hebrew: בַּר יוֹחַאי) is a religious Jewish community settlement in northern Israel. Located near Mount Meron, it falls under the jurisdiction of Merom HaGalil Regional Council. as of 2024 its population was 1,173.

== History ==
Bar Yohai was founded in 1977 as a settlement for immigrants from the Soviet Union. However, the immigrants were not interested in living such a distance from a city nor in such austere conditions (each side of a duplex was less than 60 square meters). Jewish Agency officials then offered the failing settlement to Religious Zionist families and members of nearby moshavim. This move was successful and Bar Yohai grew to over 100 families, including a small group of Canadian immigrants.

The village is situated on land near the depopulated Arab village of Safsaf, whose villagers fled to Lebanon after the Safsaf massacre in October 1948, during the 1948 Arab–Israeli war.

The community is named after rabbi Simeon bar Yochai who according to Jewish tradition was buried on Mount Meron nearby.
