= Svrbice =

Svrbice Szerbőc
- Municipality
- Flag

- Location of Svrbice in the Nitra Region Location of Svrbice in Slovakia
- Coordinates: 48.52°N 17.88°E
- Country: Slovakia
- Region: Nitra Region
- District: Topoľčany District
- First mentioned: 1268

Government
  - Mayor: Juraj Púček (SMER–SD)

Area
  - Total: 6.93 km^{2} (2.68 sq mi)
- Elevation: 271 m (889 ft)

Population (2025)
  - Total: 197
- Time zone: UTC+1 (CET)
  - Summer (DST): UTC+2 (CEST)
- Postal code: 956 06
- Area code: +421 38
- Vehicle registration plate (until 2022): TO
- Website: www.svrbice.sk

Svrbice (Hungarian: Szerbőc) is a small village in the Topoľčany District of the Nitra Region in Slovakia, situated approximately 24 km south of Topoľčany. In 2011 it had 209 inhabitants.

One of the most important sightseeings is Roman Catholic Church of Virgin Mary built in 1956. The first written reference to the village dates from 1268. Svrbice was part of Šalgovce from 1976 to 1990.

== Geography ==
The municipality lies at an altitude of 271 metres (889 ft) and covers an area of 6.93 km^{2} (2.68 sq mi) (2025).

== Population ==
Population statistic (10 years)
Year	1995	2005	2015	2025
Count	233	215	192	197
Difference		−7.72%	−10.69%	+2.60%

Population statistic
Year	2024	2025
Count	194	197
Difference		+1.54%

It has a population of 197 people (31 December 2025).

=== Ethnicity ===
Census 2021 (1+ %)
Ethnicity	Number	Fraction
Slovak	182	97.84%
Czech	4	2.15%
Not found out	4	2.15%
Total	186	

In year 2021 was 186 people by ethnicity 182 as Slovak, 4 as Czech, 4 as Not found out, 1 as Romanian and 1 as Hungarian.

Note on population: The difference values of population numbers in the table "Population statistic" and in the sections "Ethnicity" & "Religion" is caused by the use of various statistical methods.

=== Religion ===
Census 2021 (1+ %)
Religion	Number	Fraction
Roman Catholic Church	149	80.11%
None	29	15.59%
Not found out	4	2.15%
Total	186	

In year 2021 was 186 people by religion 149 from Roman Catholic Church, 29 from None, 4 from Not found out, 1 from Jewish community, 1 from Jehovah's Witnesses, 1 from Christian Congregations in Slovakia and 1 from Evangelical Church.
