= Dolné Semerovce =

Village and municipality in Slovakia

Dolné Semerovce Alsószemeréd
- Municipality
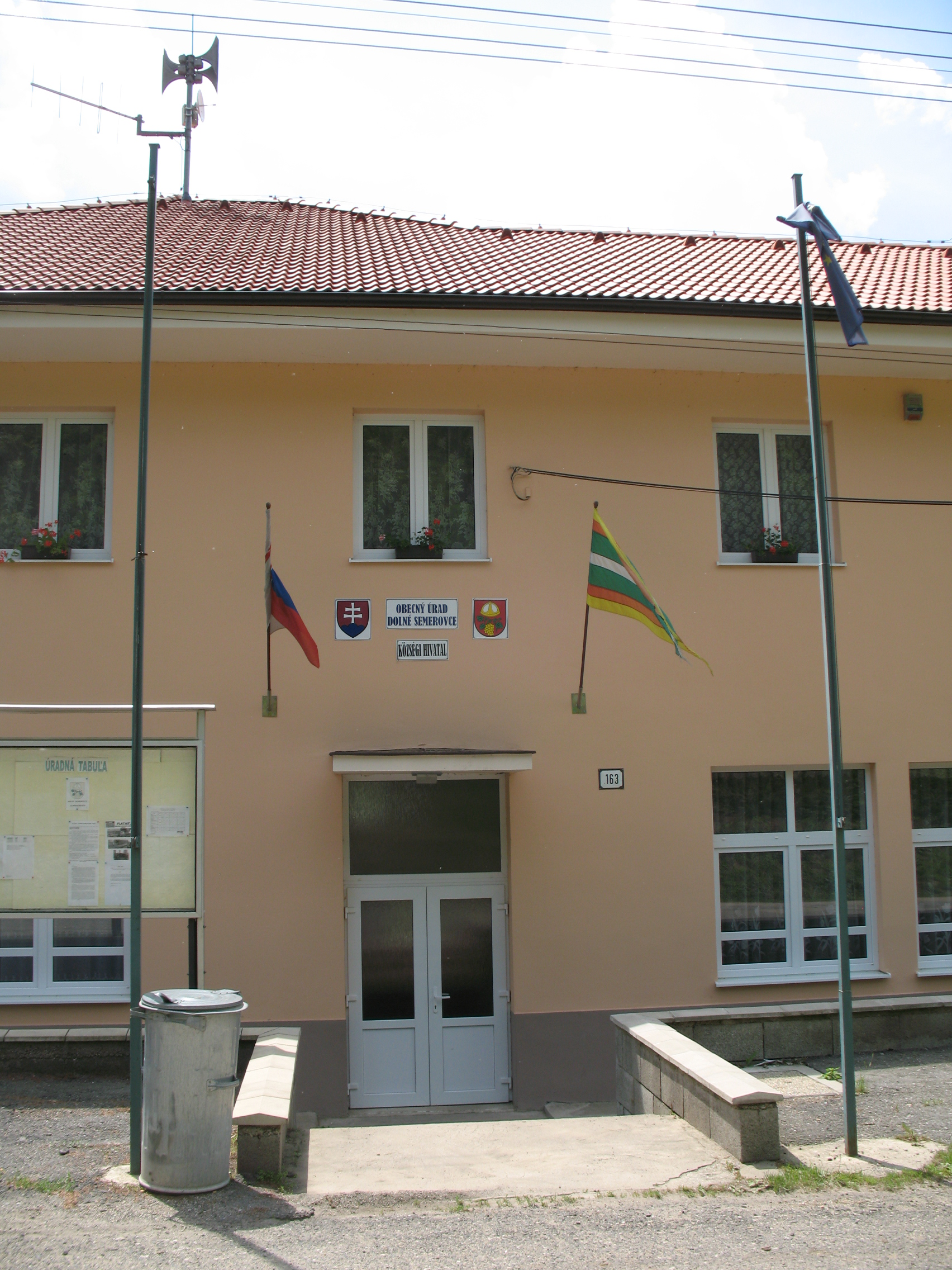
- Municipal office

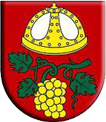
- Flag Coat of arms

- Location of Dolné Semerovce in the Nitra Region Location of Dolné Semerovce in Slovakia
- Coordinates: 48.12°N 18.85°E
- Country: Slovakia
- Region: Nitra Region
- District: Levice District
- First mentioned: 1268

Government
  - Mayor: Vendelín Baláž (Independent)

Area
  - Total: 11.86 km^{2} (4.58 sq mi)
- Elevation: 145 m (476 ft)

Population (2025)
  - Total: 523
- Time zone: UTC+1 (CET)
  - Summer (DST): UTC+2 (CEST)
- Postal code: 935 84
- Area code: +421 36
- Vehicle registration plate (until 2022): LV
- Website: www.dolne-semerovce.sk

Dolné Semerovce (Hungarian: Alsószemeréd) is a village and municipality in the Levice District in the Nitra Region of Slovakia.

== History ==
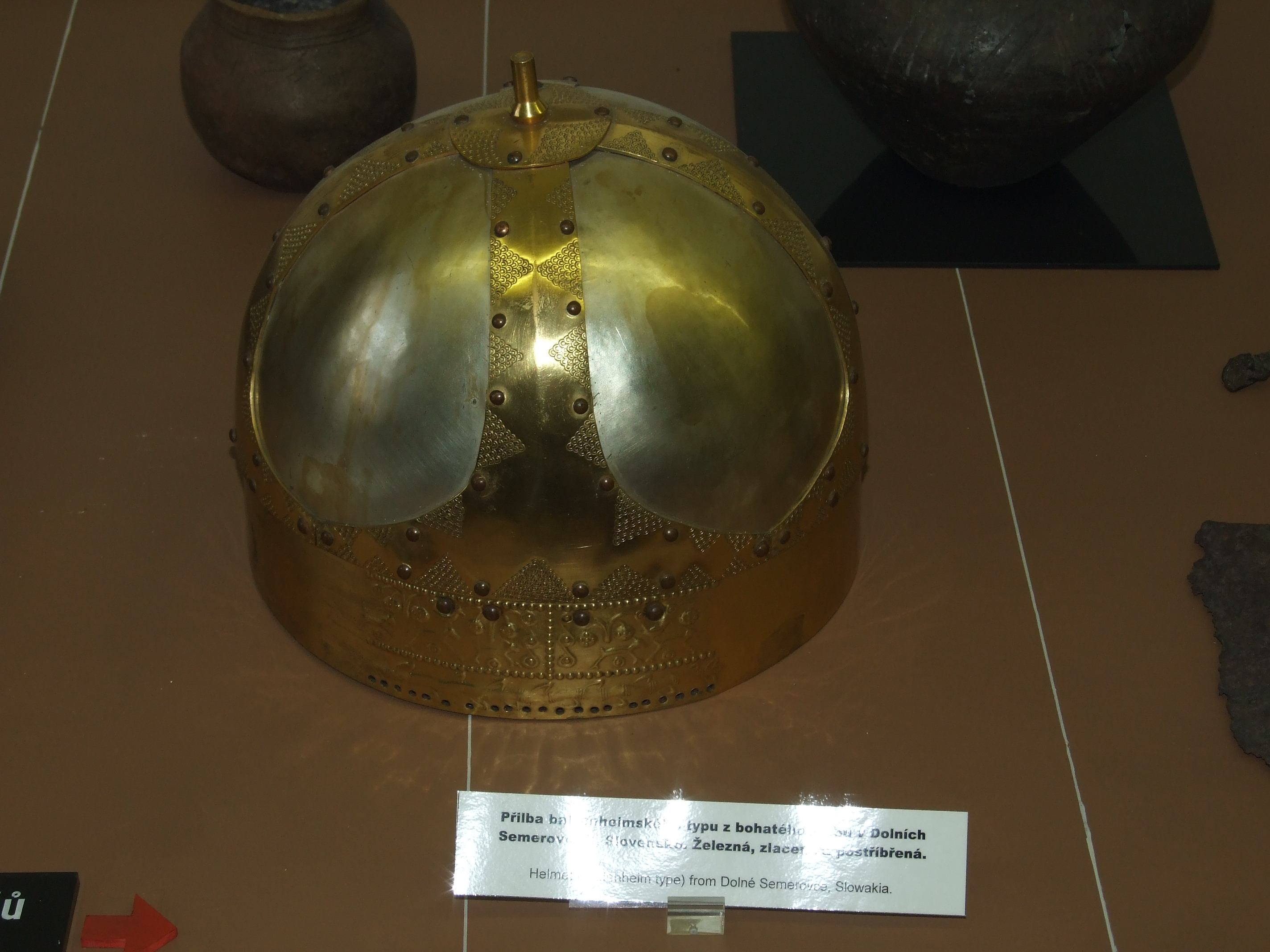
A helmet from Migration Period (6th century AD) discovered in Dolné Semerovce

In historical records the village was first mentioned in 1268.

== Geography ==
The municipality lies at an altitude of 145 metres (476 ft) and covers an area of 11.86 km^{2} (4.58 sq mi) (2025).

== Population ==
Population statistic (10 years)
Year	1995	2005	2015	2025
Count	463	506	553	523
Difference		+9.28%	+9.28%	−5.42%

Population statistic
Year	2024	2025
Count	535	523
Difference		−2.24%

It has a population of 523 people (31 December 2025).

=== Ethnicity ===
Census 2021 (1+ %)
Ethnicity	Number	Fraction
Romani	202	37.4%
Hungarian	180	33.33%
Slovak	135	25%
Not found out	40	7.4%
Total	540	

In year 2021 was 540 people by ethnicity 202 as Romani, 180 as Hungarian, 135 as Slovak and 40 as Not found out.

Note on population: The difference values of population numbers in the table "Population statistic" and in the sections "Ethnicity" & "Religion" is caused by the use of various statistical methods.

=== Religion ===
Census 2021 (1+ %)
Religion	Number	Fraction
Roman Catholic Church	431	79.81%
None	41	7.59%
Not found out	37	6.85%
Evangelical Church	13	2.41%
Christian Congregations in Slovakia	7	1.3%
Total	540	

In year 2021 was 540 people by religion 431 from Roman Catholic Church, 41 from None, 37 from Not found out, 13 from Evangelical Church, 7 from Christian Congregations in Slovakia, 4 from Other and not ascertained christian church, 4 from Greek Catholic Church and 3 from Ad hoc movements.

== Facilities ==
The village has a public library and a football pitch.

== Genealogical resources ==
The records for genealogical research are available at the state archive "Statny Archiv in Banska Bystrica, Nitra, Slovakia"

- Roman Catholic church records (births/marriages/deaths): 1703-1896 (parish A)
- Lutheran church records (births/marriages/deaths): 1721-1900 (parish B)

== See also ==
- List of municipalities and towns in Slovakia
