= Wisnuwardhana =

Javanese king

- Sri Jayawisnuwarddhana Sang Mapanji Seminingrat Sri Sakala Kalana Kulama Dhumardana Kamaleksana (ꦯꦿꦶꦗꦪꦮꦶꦱ꧀ꦤꦸꦮꦂꦢ꧀ꦝꦤꦱꦁꦩꦥꦚ꧀ꦗꦶꦱꦺꦩꦶꦤꦶꦁꦫꦠ꧀ꦱꦿꦶꦱꦏꦭꦏꦭꦤꦏꦸꦭꦩꦝꦸꦩꦂꦢꦤꦏꦩꦭꦺꦏ꧀ꦱꦤ)
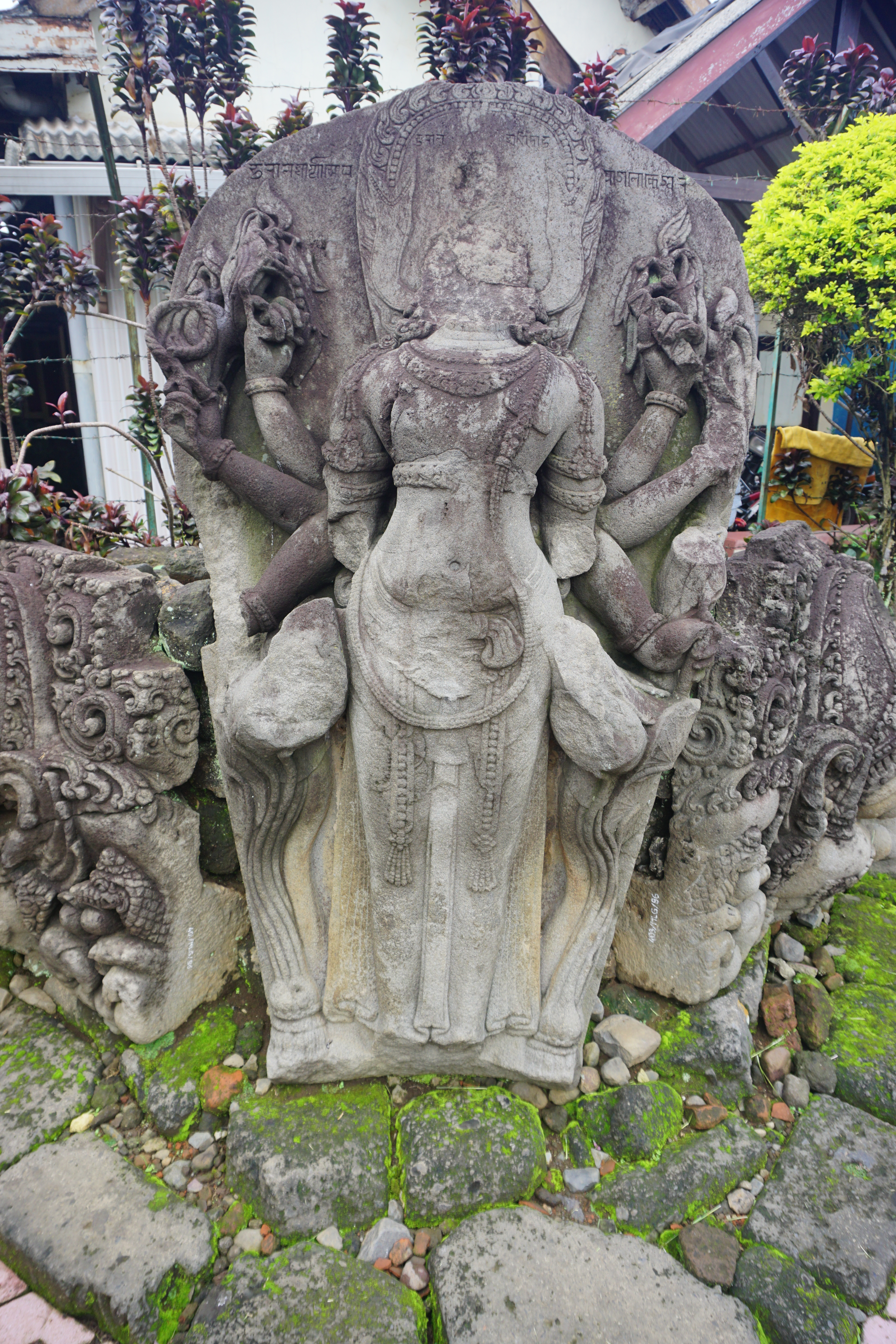
- Statue of Amoghapāśa, representing King Wisnuwardhana as Bodhisattva Avalokiteśvara from Jago Temple, Tumpang, Malang.
- Reign: 1248 – 1268
- Predecessor: Anusapati
- Successor: Kertanagara
- Born: Tumapel Palace
- Died: 1270/1272; Singhasari Palace
- Burial: Mleri Temple, Srenget, Blitar, East Java; Jago Temple, Tumpang, Malang, East Java
- Spouse: Jayawardhani
- Issue: Kertanagara; Turukbali (wife of Jayakatwang); Putri Tapasi
Names
- Nararya Sminingrat
Regnal name
- Sri Jayawisnuwarddhana Sang Mapanji Seminingrat Sri Sakala Kalana Kulama Dhumardana Kamalekasana
Posthumous name
- Bhattara Parameswara
- Dynasty: Rajasa dynasty
- Father: Anusapati
- Religion: Hindu–Buddhist

Wisnuwardhana, also known as Jayawisnuwardhana (died in Singhasari, 1270/1272), alias Nararya Seminingrat, was king of Tumapel from 1248 until his death in 1268 under the regnal title: Śrī Jayawisnuwarddhana Sang Mapāñji Seminingrat Śrī Sakala Kalana Kulama Dhumardana Kamalekṣana. (According to the Maribong inscription, dated 1248.)

Wisnuwardhana grew up in the court of king Ken Arok alongside Narasingamurti who would become his deputy. His childhood allowed him to understand the importance of securing succession so he appointed his son Kertanagara king in 1254, when he was still a young boy, thus securing his rule.

Regnal titles
Preceded by Anusapati	King of Tumapel / Singhasari; 1248 – 1268	Succeeded by Kertanagara
