= Kidal (disambiguation) =

Kidal is a town in Mali

Kidal may refer to:

- Kidal Region, a region in Mali
- Kidal temple, a Hindu temple built under the Singhasari kingdom, located in Malang, East Java, Indonesia
