= Jago Temple =

13th century Hindu temple in Indonesia

Coordinates: 8°0′20.81″S 112°45′50.82″E

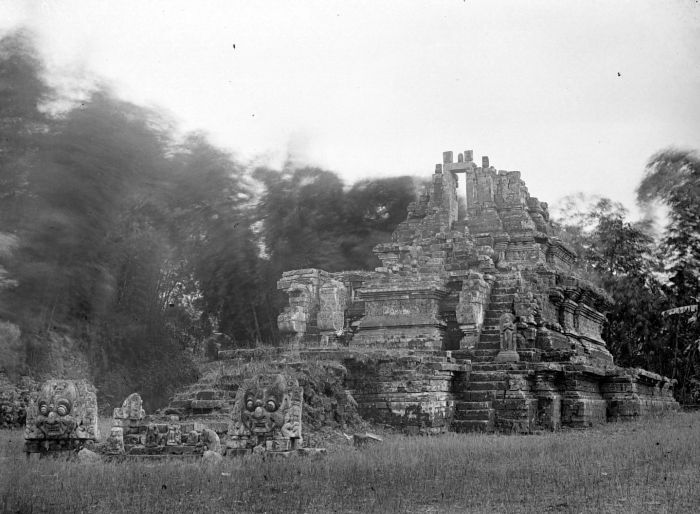
Candi Jago

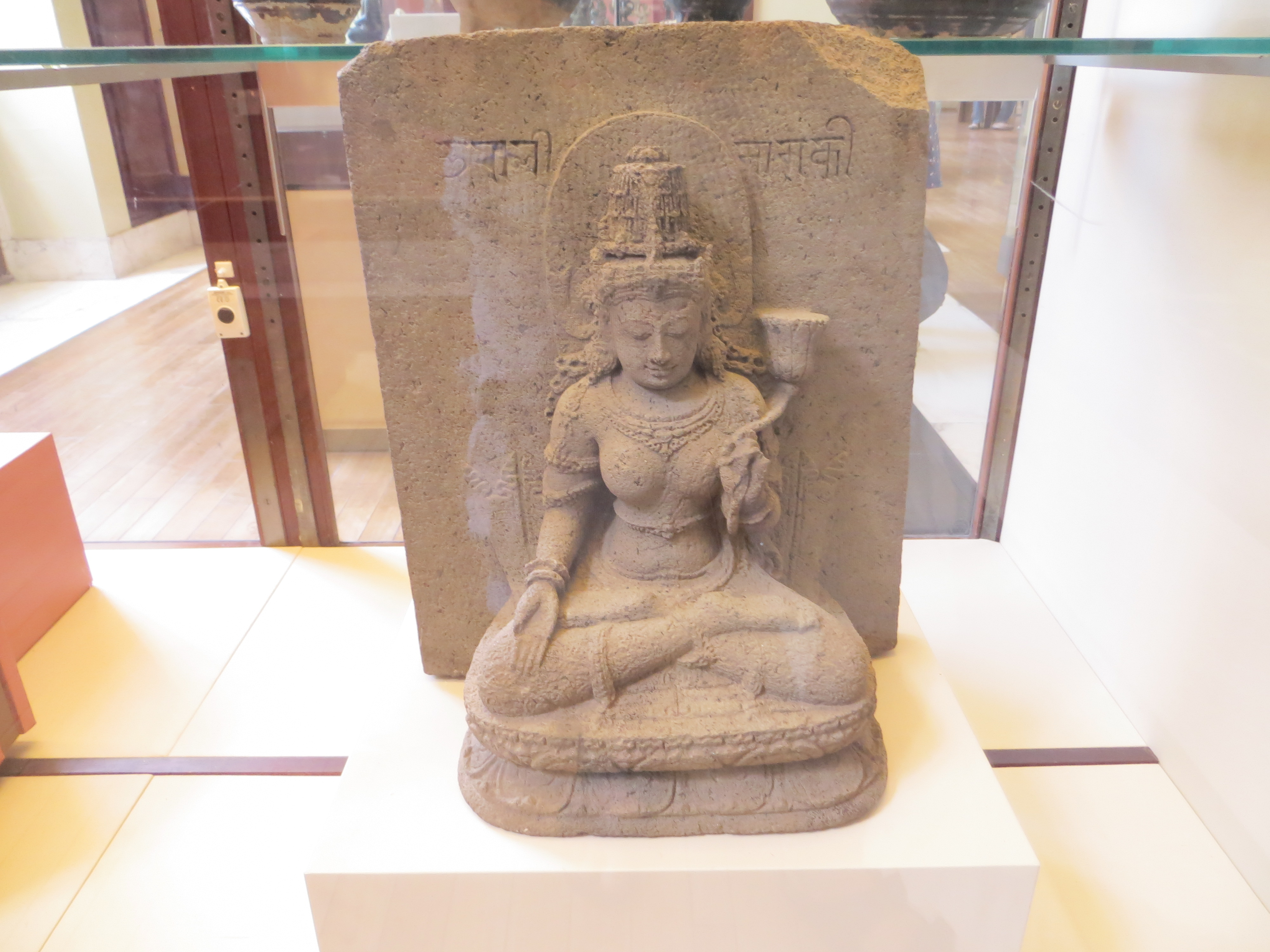
Statue of the Goddess Mamaki from Candi Jago, one of a set of five figures dating to 13th-14th Century AD, British Museum.

Jago temple (Indonesian: Candi Jago) is a 13th-century Hindu-Buddhist temple from the Singhasari kingdom in East Java, Indonesia, located about 22 kilometres (14 mi) from Malang. The Nagarakretagama, written in 14th century, describes this temple as Jajaghu (English: "majestic"), and mentions it as one of the temples visited by King Hayam Wuruk during his royal tour across East Java. The name of Adityawarman appears in 1343 on an image of the Bodhisattva Manjusri. It is one of several related temples in the region.

After his death in 1268, the Singhasari King Vishnuvardhana was deified here as Shiva, in the form of Bodhisattva Avalokitesvara. The temple's bas-reliefs depict scenes from the Kunjarakarna, Parthayajna, Arjunavivaha, and Krishnayana. They are read counterclockwise. For educational purposes, the temple's stories have been integrated into children's literature and Augmented Reality.

== History/Architecture ==
=== History ===
"Jajaghu" is the original name of the temple. It was (like other temples) built to honor a deceased king (King Vishnuvardhana) of the Singhasari period. The last of the Singhasari kings was his son, Kertanagara (honored in Jawi).

=== Architecture ===
The counterclockwise method is referred to as "prasawya". There are reliefs on each floor of the temple. It possesses more reliefs than Kidal and Singhasari.

== The Bas-Reliefs ==
=== Angling Dharma ===
These reliefs are visual depictions of the stories of King Angling Dharma, who was capable of talking to animals.

== Legacy ==
"Tantri" are stories that use animals to teach moral lessons. Students' smartphones have been utilized in translating the stories into AR.

== See also ==
- Candi of Indonesia
- Hinduism in Java
- Indonesian Esoteric Buddhism
- Jawi Temple
- Singhasari temple
- Kidal Temple
