= Ken Dedes =

Ken Dedes ꦏꦺꦤ꧀ꦝꦼꦝꦼꦱ꧀ 𑼒𑼾𑼥𑽂𑼞𑽀𑼞𑽀𑼱𑽁
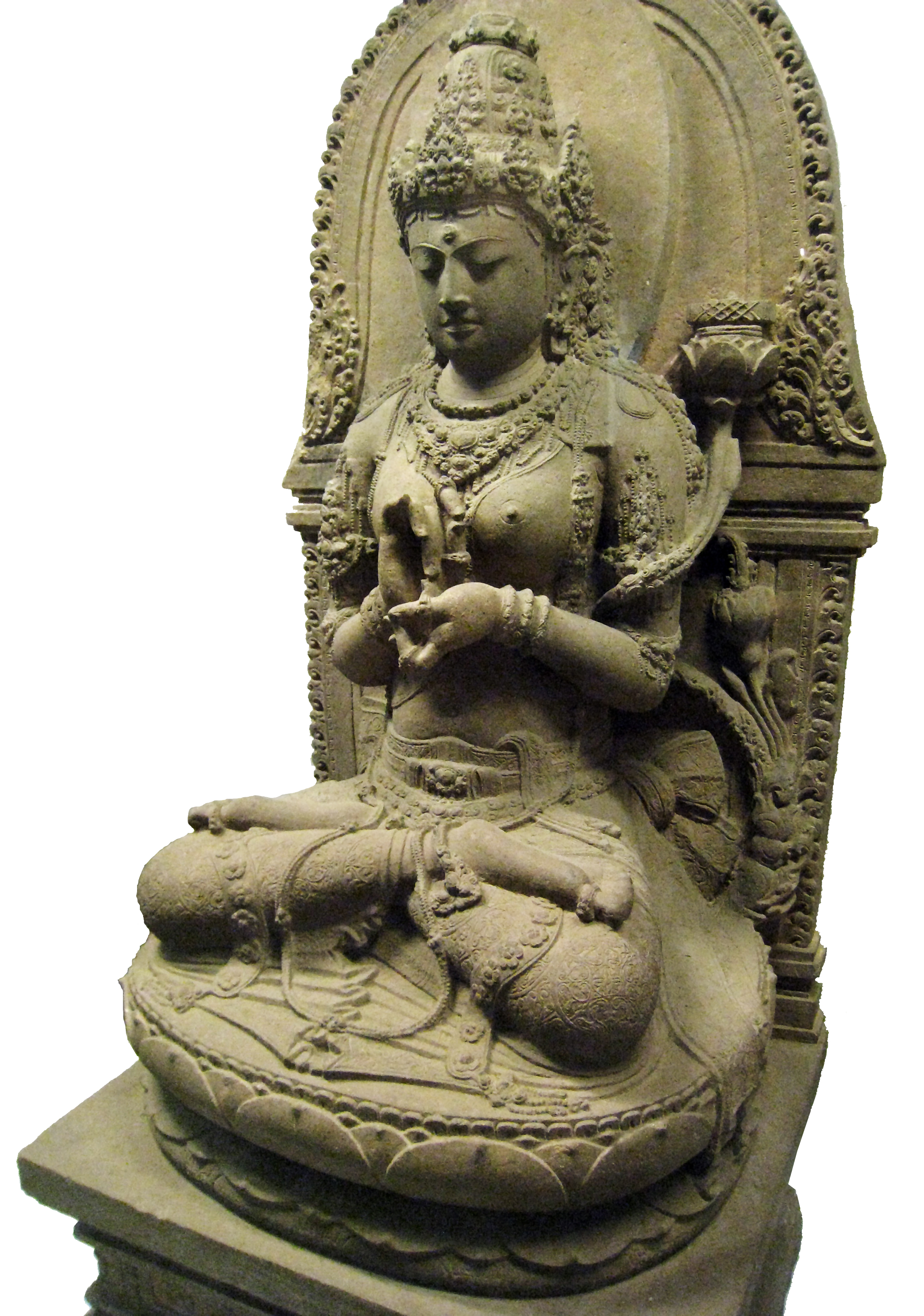
- The serene beauty of the Prajnaparamita statue, found near Singhasari temple, is believed to be a portrayal of Queen Dedes (from the collection of the National Museum of Indonesia).

Queen Consort of Singhasari
- Tenure: 1222 – 1227
- Spouse: Tunggul Ametung; Ken Arok
- Issue: Anusapati; Mahisa Wong Ateleng; Apanji Saprang; Agnibhaya; Devi Rumbu
Names
- Ken Dedes
- House: Rajasa
- Father: Mpu Purwa
- Religion: Mahayana Buddhism

Ken Dedes (Java: ꦏꦺꦤ꧀ꦝꦼꦝꦼꦱ꧀, Kawi: 𑼒𑼾𑼥𑽂𑼞𑽀𑼞𑽀𑼱𑽁, Kèn Ḍĕḍĕs) was the first queen of Singhasari. She was the wife of Ken Arok, the first ruler of Singhasari, Java, Indonesia. She was later considered the ancestress of kings that ruled Java, the great mother of the Rajasa dynasty, the royal family that ruled Java from the Singhasari to the Majapahit era. Local tradition mentioned her as an embodiment of perfect beauty.

== Early life ==
Most of the record of her life comes from the account of Pararaton (The Book of Kings), a mixed historical account including supernatural tales and stories. She was the daughter of a Buddhist monk, Mpu Purwa. According to tradition, Ken Dedes' exceptional and extraordinary beauty was famous throughout the land and attracted Tunggul Ametung, the ruler of Tumapel (now the Singhasari district, East Java) who later took her as his wife.

According to local tradition, Ken Dedes was kidnapped while her father was away meditating and forced to become Tunggul Ametung's wife. Her father cursed Tunggul Ametung, saying he would be killed because of Ken Dedes' beauty. The curse became reality when Ken Arok assassinated Tunggul Ametung and took Ken Dedes as his wife.

== The Consort of Ken Arok ==
According to Pararaton and local tradition, Ken Arok's usurpation of Tunggul Ametung was caused by Ken Dedes' exceptional beauty and charisma. The story is that Ken Arok was standing close near the royal carriage as it halted and caught a glimpse of the young queen. When her clothes accidentally parted, Ken Arok caught sight of her body and thighs and he saw that her body were 'shining'. A Brahmin, Lohgawe, told Ken Arok that this radiance was the sign that Ken Dedes bears the divine quality and would be the bearer of kings. Her beauty was said to have been so perfect that whoever married her, regardless of his status, would inevitably be destined to become king of kings. Because of this, Ken Arok was motivated to dispatch Tunggul Ametung.

Ken Arok later launched a campaign that defeated Kertajaya, King of Kediri and he founded his kingdom, Singhasari. Ken Dedes became his wife, the first queen of Singhasari. According to local beliefs, the statue of Prajnaparamita, the goddess of transcendental wisdom in Buddhist tradition and found in Cungkup Putri near Singhasari temple, was made in her likeness and probably served as her mortuary deified statue.

Anusapati, Ken Dedes's son from Tunggul Ametung, murdered Ken Arok and became the second ruler of Singhasari.
