= Anusapati =

Second king of Singhasari in east Java (r. 1222–1248)

Anusapati ꦄꦤꦸꦱꦥꦠꦶ
- Sri Bathara Anusapati

Second King of Singhasari
- Reign: 1227–1248
- Predecessor: Ken Arok
- Successor: Wisnuwardhana
- Born: Tumapel Palace
- Died: 1248; Tumapel Palace
- Burial: Kidal Temple, Tumpang, Malang
- Issue: Wisnuwardhana (and others)
- Dynasty: Rajasa
- Father: Tunggul Ametung (Pararaton version); Ranggah Rajasa (Nagarakretagama version)
- Mother: Ken Dedes
- Religion: Hindu-Buddhist

Anusapati, Anushanatha, or Anushapati was the second king of Singhasari, an Indianized Hindu kingdom in east Java between 1222 and 1248.

He was the son of Tunggul Ametung, the first husband of Ken Dedes. Anushapati assassinated Ken Arok in 1227, avenging his father's death.

The semi-mythical Pararaton, a Javanese historical chronicle, states that Tunggul Ametung, the ruler of the minor Javanese kingdom of Tumapel, was killed by the first king of Singhasari Ken Arok using a cursed kris, a type of Javanese knife, forged by Mpu Gandring. After he killed Tunggul Ametung, Ken Arok married Ken Dedes and formed the kingdom of Singhasari. The Pararaton alleges that Anusapati used the same cursed kris to kill Ken Arok.

According to the Pararaton, Anusapati was killed by his half-brother, Panji Tohjaya, using the same kris he used to kill Ken Arok.

== Pararaton Version ==
According to the Pararaton (Book of Kings), Anusapati, also known as Panji Anusapati, was the son of Tunggul Ametung and Ken Dedes. His father was murdered by Ken Arok while Anusapati was still in the womb. Ken Arok then married Ken Dedes and took over Tunggul Ametung's position as the akuwu (district chief) of Tumapel. Later, in the year 1222, Ken Arok proclaimed the establishment of the Kingdom of Tumapel, independent of the power of Panjalu. He even succeeded in defeating the Kingdom of Kadiri under the reign of King Kertajaya.

When Ken Arok appointed Mahisa Wong Ateleng as the ruler of Kadiri, Anusapati was perplexed by Ken Arok's action, despite being Ken Arok's eldest son. He also felt less favored by Ken Arok compared to his other siblings. After pressing his mother (Ken Dedes), he finally discovered that he was actually the biological son of Tunggul Ametung, who had been killed by Ken Arok.

Anusapati managed to obtain the kris (dagger) forged by Mpu Gandring, the same kris that Ken Arok had used to kill his own father. Using that kris, an aide of Anusapati from Batil Village successfully assassinated Ken Arok while he was having dinner, in the Śaka year 1168 (1247 AD). Anusapati then immediately killed his own aide to destroy the evidence. To everyone, he announced that his aide had gone mad and ran amok, resulting in the king's death.

Following Ken Arok's death, Anusapati ascended the throne in the Śaka year 1170 (1248 AD). His reign was plagued by anxiety due to fears of retaliation from Ken Arok’s children. Anusapati's palace was placed under strict guard and even surrounded by deep moats.

Nevertheless, Panji Tohjaya, the son of Ken Arok by a concubine named Ken Umang, was not without cunning. One day, he invited Anusapati out for a cockfight. Anusapati unsuspectingly complied, as it was his hobby. While Anusapati was engrossed in watching the roosters fight, Tohjaya suddenly stabbed him using the Mpu Gandring kris. Anusapati died instantly. This event occurred in the Śaka year 1171 (1249 AD).

Following Anusapati's death, Tohjaya ascended the throne. However, his rule was short-lived as he was subsequently killed in the Śaka year 1172 (1250 AD) due to a rebellion led by Ranggawuni, Anusapati's son, and Mahisa Campaka, Mahisa Wong Ateleng's son..

== See also ==
- Kidal Temple
- Greater India
- Indosphere
- Hinduism in Indonesia
