= Safsaf =

Depopulated Palestinian village in present-day Israel

Safsaf صفصاف Safsofa
- Village
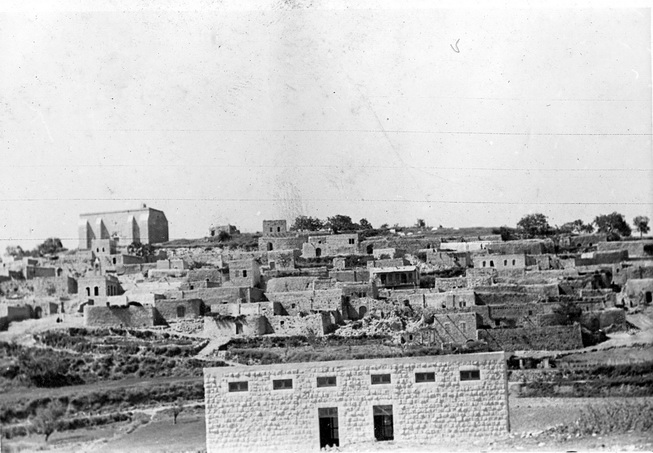
- Safsaf in 1938
- Etymology: "the Osier willow"
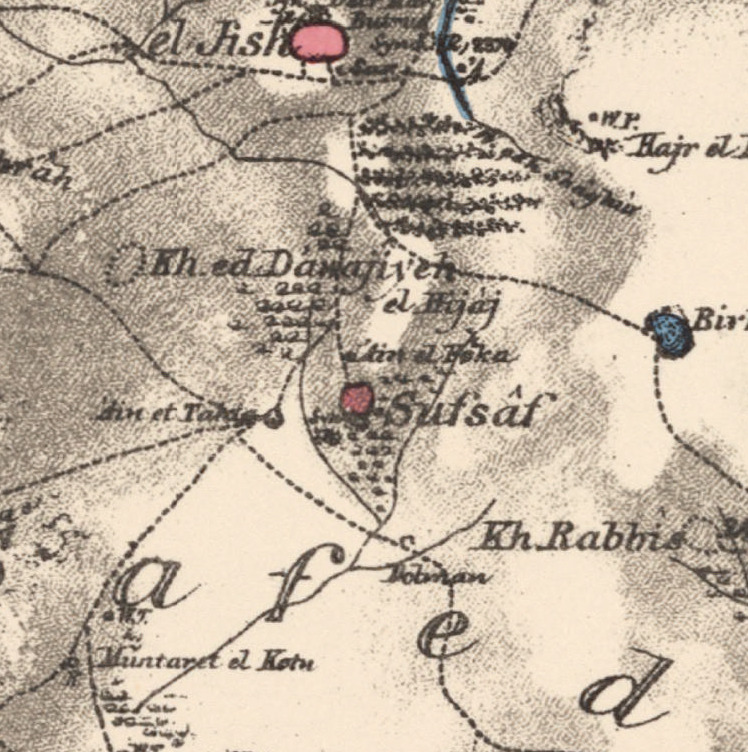
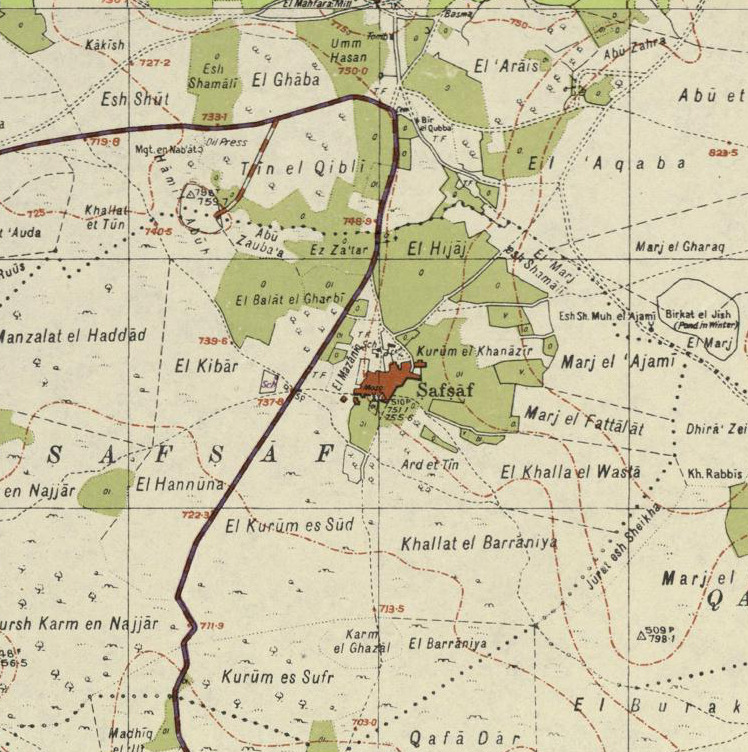
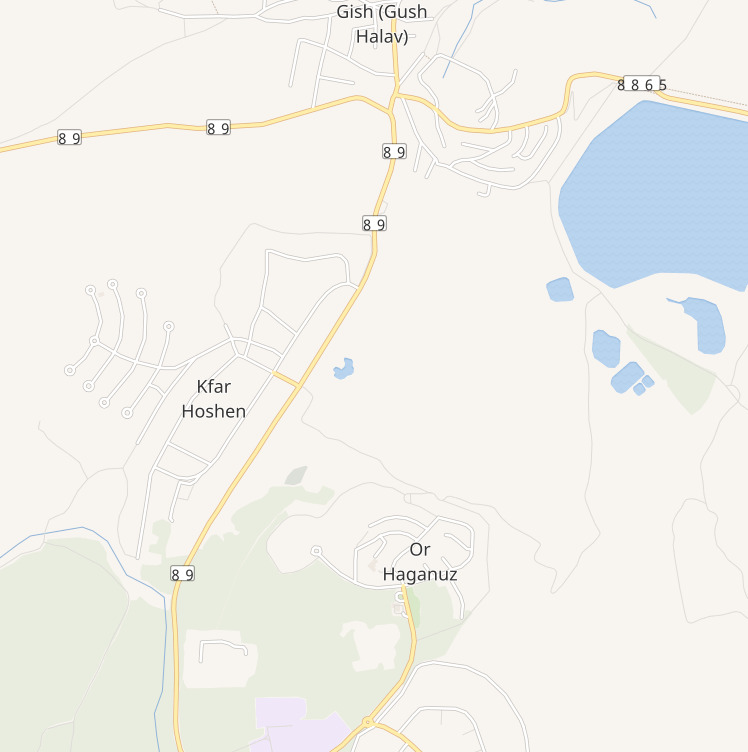
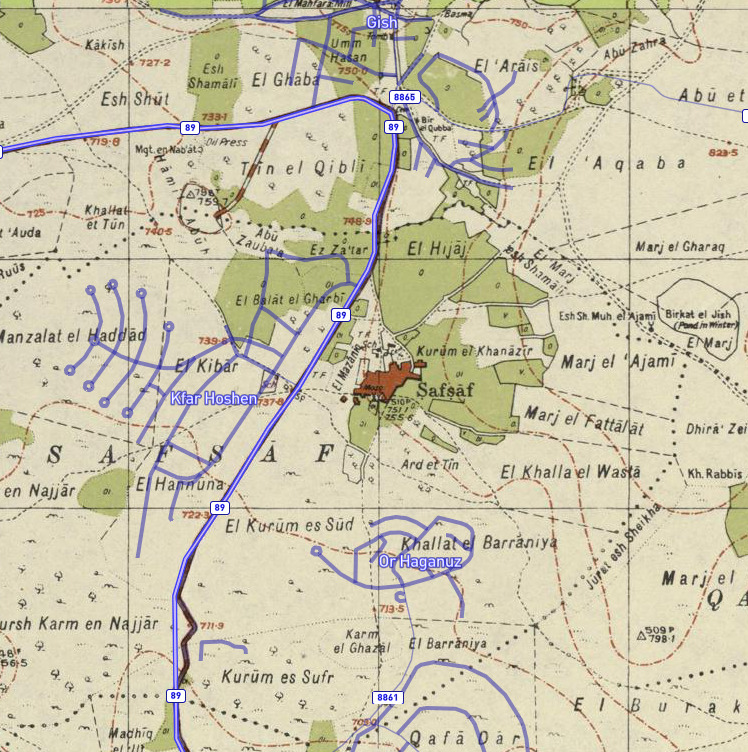
- 1870s map 1940s map modern map 1940s with modern overlay map A series of historical maps of the area around Safsaf (click the buttons)

- Location within Mandatory Palestine
- Coordinates: 33°00′42″N 35°26′44″E
- Palestine grid: 192/268
- Geopolitical entity: Mandatory Palestine
- Subdistrict: Safad
- Date of depopulation: 29 October 1948

Area
  - Total: 7,391 dunams (7.391 km^{2}; 2.854 sq mi)

Population (1945)
  - Total: 910
- Cause(s) of depopulation: Military assault by Yishuv forces
- Secondary cause: Fear of being caught up in the fighting
- Current Localities: Kfar Hoshen, Bar Yohai

Safsaf (Arabic: صفصاف Ṣafṣāf, "weeping willow") was a Palestinian village 9 kilometres northwest of Safed, present-day Israel. Its villagers fled to Lebanon after the Safsaf massacre in October 1948, during the 1948 Arab–Israeli War.

== History ==
The village was called Safsofa in Roman times.

According to Yaqut, it was harried in 950 CE by the Hamdanid ruler of Aleppo, Sayf al-Dawla.

=== Ottoman era ===
In the early sixteenth century CE, Safsaf was incorporated into the Ottoman Empire, and by the 1596 tax records, it was a village in the nahiyah ("subdistrict") of Jira, part of Sanjak Safad. It had a population of 25 households, an estimated 138 persons, all Muslim. The villagers paid a fixed tax rate of 25% on several agricultural items, including wheat, barley, olives and fruits, as well as other types of produce, such as beehives and goats; a total of 3,714 akçe. A quarter of the revenue went to a waqf (religious endowment).

In 1838 Safsaf was noted as a village in the Safad district, while in 1875 Victor Guérin described it as a village with fifteen Muslim families.

In 1881 the PEF's Survey of Western Palestine described Safsaf as a small village situated on a plain, with a population of about 100. They also noted that "ornamented stones of a preexisting public building" had been built into the doorway of the village mosque. The villagers cultivated olive and fig trees and vineyards.

A population list from about 1887 showed Safsaf to have about 740 inhabitants, all Muslim. At this time it was part of Beirut vilayet.

=== British Mandate era ===
Safsaf became a part of the British Mandate in 1922. During this time, the village lay on the eastern side of the Safad-Tarshiha highway and extended in a northeast–southwest direction. All the residents of Safsaf were Muslims. A mosque and several shops were located in the village center, and an elementary school was established during this period. Agriculture was the main economic activity, and it was both irrigated from springs and rainfed. Fruits and olives were cultivated on the land north of the village.

In the 1922 census of Palestine Safsaf had a population of 521 Muslims, increasing in the 1931 census to 662, still all Muslims, in a total of 124 houses.

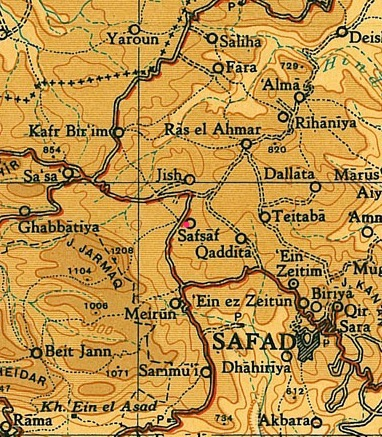
Safsaf. 1945. Survey of Palestine

In the 1945 statistics the population was 910 Muslims, with a total of 7,391 dunams of land, according to an official land and population survey. Of this, a total of 2,586 dunums were allotted to cereals; 769 dunums were irrigated or used for orchards, while a 72 dunams was built-up (urban) area.

=== 1948, and aftermath ===
On October 29, 1948, Israeli forces assaulted the village as part of Operation Hiram. After the villagers surrendered, some 50-70 men were massacred while bound and four women reported being raped. The IDF records for this massacre remain classified. However, in a February 26, 2026 Haaretz investigation, Mordechai Maklef, then an operations officer on the Northern Front (and later IDF chief of staff), revealed that in some operations “the potential enemy” was eliminated, meaning civilians. He cited cases including Safsaf, Jish, Eilabun, Lod, Ramla, and larger-scale actions in the south, adding that the intention was expulsion and implying that mass displacement could not be carried out without such acts of terrrorism (טרור).

In 1949 Kfar Hoshen was established on village land, followed by Bar Yohai in 1979, also on village land.

In 1992 the village site was described: "The site is overgrown with grass and scattered trees among which can be seen a few terraces and piles of stones from destroyed houses. A few houses are inhabited by Israelis. A fraction of surrounding land is cultivated by the settlements, and the rest is forested."

== See also ==
- Killings and massacres during the 1948 Palestine War
- Depopulated Palestinian locations in Israel

== Bibliography ==
- Barron, J. B., ed. (1923). Palestine: Report and General Abstracts of the Census of 1922. Government of Palestine.
- Benveniśtî, M. (2000). Sacred landscape: the buried history of the Holy Land since 1948 (Illustrated ed.). University of California Press. ISBN 0-520-21154-5.
- Conder, C.R.; Kitchener, H.H. (1881). The Survey of Western Palestine: Memoirs of the Topography, Orography, Hydrography, and Archaeology. Vol. 1. London: Committee of the Palestine Exploration Fund.
- Government of Palestine, Department of Statistics (1945). Village Statistics, April, 1945.
- Guérin, V. (1880). Description Géographique Historique et Archéologique de la Palestine (in French). Vol. 3: Galilee, pt. 2. Paris: L'Imprimerie Nationale.
- Hadawi, S. (1970). Village Statistics of 1945: A Classification of Land and Area ownership in Palestine. Palestine Liberation Organization Research Centre.
- Hütteroth, W.-D.; Abdulfattah, K. (1977). Historical Geography of Palestine, Transjordan and Southern Syria in the Late 16th Century. Erlanger Geographische Arbeiten, Sonderband 5. Erlangen, Germany: Vorstand der Fränkischen Geographischen Gesellschaft. ISBN 3-920405-41-2.
- Khalidi, W. (1992). All That Remains: The Palestinian Villages Occupied and Depopulated by Israel in 1948. Washington D.C.: Institute for Palestine Studies. ISBN 0-88728-224-5.
- Le Strange, G. (1890). Palestine Under the Moslems: A Description of Syria and the Holy Land from A.D. 650 to 1500. Committee of the Palestine Exploration Fund.
- Mills, E., ed. (1932). Census of Palestine 1931. Population of Villages, Towns and Administrative Areas. Jerusalem: Government of Palestine.
- Morris, B. (2004). The Birth of the Palestinian Refugee Problem Revisited. Cambridge University Press. ISBN 978-0-521-00967-6.
- Nazzal, Nafez (1978). The Palestinian Exodus from Galilee 1948. Beirut: The Institute for Palestine Studies. ISBN 9780887281280. (Safsaf, p. 93-96, 107)
- Palmer, E.H. (1881). The Survey of Western Palestine: Arabic and English Name Lists Collected During the Survey by Lieutenants Conder and Kitchener, R. E. Transliterated and Explained by E.H. Palmer. Committee of the Palestine Exploration Fund.
- Rhode, H. (1979). Administration and Population of the Sancak of Safed in the Sixteenth Century (PhD). Columbia University. Archived from the original on 2020-03-01.
- Robinson, E.; Smith, E. (1841). Biblical Researches in Palestine, Mount Sinai and Arabia Petraea: A Journal of Travels in the year 1838. Vol. 3. Boston: Crocker & Brewster.
- Schumacher, G. (1888). "Population list of the Liwa of Akka". Quarterly Statement - Palestine Exploration Fund. 20: 169–191.
