= Ken Arok =

Ken Angrok
- Sri Ranggah Rajasa Bhatara Sang Amurwabhumi
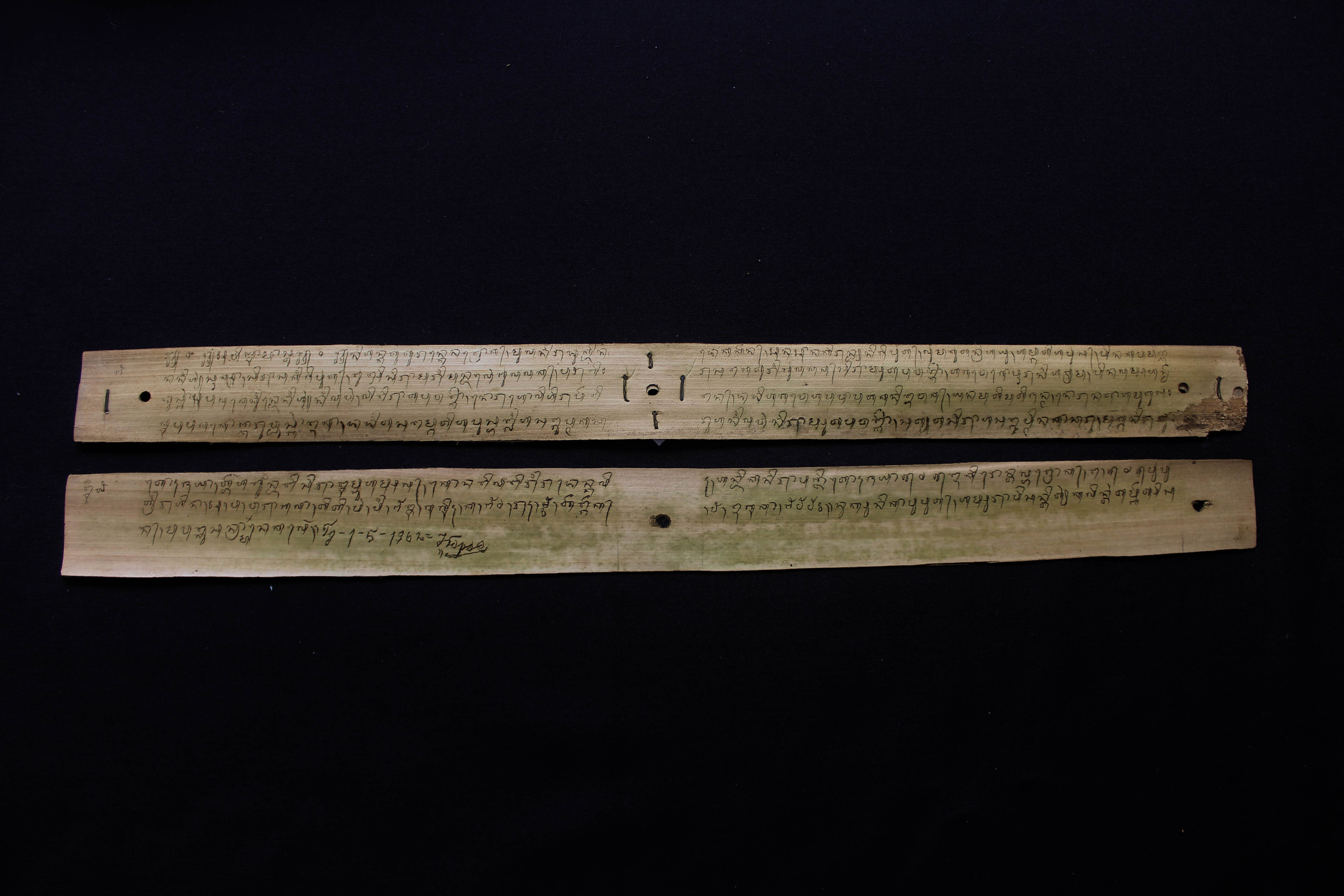
- Bali-lontar-Tojan-Kénangrok.

King of Tumapel
- Reign: 1222–1227
- Predecessor: Office established
- Successor: Anusapati
- Born: 1182; Area of East Java (then under the rule of Kediri)
- Died: 1227 (aged 44–45); Dharma site of Kagenengan, consecrated as Śivamahadewa
- Burial: Candi Kagenengan (east of Sang Hyang Kawi), Malang, East Java
- Spouse: Ken Dedes (Queen Consort); Ken Umang (Concubine)
- Issue: Anusapati; Mahisa Wonga Teleng; Apanji Saprang; Gunungbhaya; Dewi Rembu; Tohjaya; Panji Sudhatu; Tuan Wergola; Dewi Rambi
- Dynasty: Rajasa
- Father: Sri Jayamerta
- Mother: Ken Ndok
- Religion: Hindu Shaivism

Ken Arok (or Ken Angrok) (Kawi script: 𑼒𑼾𑼥𑽁𑼄𑼖𑽂𑼔𑽂𑼬𑼾𑼴𑼒𑽁) (Javanese script: ꦏꦺꦤ꧀ꦄꦁꦫꦺꦴꦏ꧀), Rajasa (died c. 1227), was the founder and first ruler of Singhasari (also spelled Singosari), a medieval Indianized Hindu–Buddhist kingdom in the East Java area of Indonesia. He is considered the ancestor of the Rajasa dynasty of the Singhasari and Majapahit line of monarchs. He came from humble origins but subsequently rose to be the most powerful ruler in Java. His life was coloured with adventures, treacheries, and tragedies.

== Early life ==
According to the Pararaton, a semi-mythical literary work on the kings of Java, Ken Arok was born to a poor peasant family on the bank of the Brantas River in East Java. He was the son of a Brahmin Sri Jayamerta and his mother Ken Endok.

The infant Ken Arok was placed in the Brantas by his parents who hoped he would be found by a wealthier family and get a better life. However, the baby Ken Arok was found by a thief called Lembong. His foster father taught him all his criminal skills and young Ken Arok grew to be the most cunning thief in Kediri. Doing much mischief and crimes, he was known to the capital. Many people were sent to catch him, but none were successful.

One day Ken Arok met with Mpu Lohgawe, an Indian rishi who patiently taught Ken Arok to abandon his sinful life and start a new life. Lohgawe proclaimed Arok as an avatar of Vishnu. His effort was successful and later he managed to get Ken Arok to become an attendant of Tunggul Ametung, a powerful regional leader of the Tumapel area.

By chance, Ken Arok accidentally saw Ken Dedes, a beautiful wife of Tunggul Ametung, when she was taking a bath. Legend says when the wind blew over her dress and revealed her legs, Ken Arok said that he saw a beautiful light shining. He later told this to his teacher, who stated that it was a sign that Ken Dedes would bear a royal dynasty and any man that took her as wife would be a King. Ken Arok, already infatuated by her beauty, became even more eager to take her by any means —including killing Tunggul Ametung if necessary. By this time, Ken Arok had a wife, a woman named Ken Umang from his village, and left her pregnant..

== Kris of Mpu Gandring ==
Tunggul Ametung however was a very powerful man and held an important position. Thus, Ken Arok needed an exceptionally strong weapon to defeat him and also had to find a way to do so without himself being punished for the crime. He managed to get this by ordering a kris from a famous smith called Mpu Gandring. However, the Kris casting took a very long time. After several months, an impatient Ken Arok visited Mpu Gandring to check on the kris's progress. He saw that the kris had already taken shape and was strong enough to be called an exceptional weapon. However, Mpu Gandring stated that he still needed several months to perform rituals to imbue the kris with more magical power, not only to make it strong but also to prevent it from becoming an evil weapon.

Ken Arok became furious on hearing this. Knowing that Ken Dedes was pregnant, and determined to murder Tunggul Ametung before his wife gave birth to a possible son and heir, Ken Arok took the kris from its maker and stabbed Mpu Gandring. With his last breath, Mpu Gandring famously cursed Ken Arok, foretelling that he himself and seven generations of his descendants would be killed by that cursed kris.

Now owning the weapon, Ken Arok prepared for the next step of his plan. He gave the kris to Kebo Ijo, another attendant of Tunggul Ametung, a man known to be fond of collecting krises. As Ken Arok expected, Kebo Ijo showed his new kris to every man he met. The kris was not only strong but also had a unique pattern that made it easily recognized. It wasn't long before almost everyone in Tumapel knew about kris.

One night, Ken Arok stole the kris back from Kebo Ijo while he was asleep. He then secretly went to Tunggul Ametung's room stabbed him to death, and left the kris at the scene. In the morning, everyone in Tumapel was shocked to hear of Tunggul Ametung's death. When they found the kris, they accused Kebo Ijo of being the assassin, just as Ken Arok had planned. Before Kebo Ijo was able to defend himself, Ken Arok stabbed him to death, on the pretext of avenging Tunggul Ametung.

And so Ken Arok was able to kill Tunggul Ametung, take Ken Dedes to be his wife, and proclaim himself the new ruler of Tumapel.

The ambition of Ken Arok did not stop in Tumapel. In 1222, at the battle of Ganter, he defeated King Kertajaya of Kediri and founded the new kingdom of Singasari. Kediri became a fief under the kingdom of Singasari.

== Rule and his death ==
Ken Arok thus founded a new kingdom and started a new dynasty. He took the title Sri Ranggah Rajasa Bhatara Amurwabhumi (The rainbow king of the universe and all lands), and his dynasty was called the Rajasa dynasty. His new kingdom was centered in Singasari (now in Malang municipality), about 50 kilometres east of Kediri. To legitimate his ascension, he claimed to be a son of Siwa.

Ken Arok's rule however was short. Anusapati, son of Ken Dedes and Tunggul Ametung and thus Ken Arok's stepson, had suspected for a long time that Ken Arok was responsible for his father's death. One day, after finding out the truth, he went after and killed Ken Arok. Legend says that Anusapati used the kris of Mpu Gandring to kill Ken Arok; the same kris that Ken Arok used to kill Tunggul Ametung thus fulfilling the beginning of Empu Gandring's curse. In the end, Anusapati was also killed by his stepbrother, Panji Tohjaya with the same kris.

== Descendants ==
The kings of Majapahit were believed to be descended from Ken Arok, as also were the Mataram rulers. Ki/Kyai Ageng Pemanahan, the founder of Mataram, claimed himself to inherit the royal blood of Majapahit. This makes all subsequent Mataram kings descendants of Ken Arok who is also believed to be the ancestor of the new Mataram Empire founded in the 17th century which split into two in 1755 to become the kingdoms of present-day Surakarta, and Ngayogyakarta Hadiningrat (The Sultanate of Jogjakarta or Jogja), thus making Ken Arok and Ken Dedes the ancestors of all Javanese monarchs.

== In popular culture ==
The story of Ken Arok has been enduringly popular in Central and East Java. He has been the subject of several books, movies, and traditional Javanese theater (ketoprak). Ken Arok is remembered both as a cunning and treacherous person but also as a man with a strong will to pursue his dream. In several modern serial stories, many tell or are set against the backdrop of the story of Maharaja Singhasari the First, both when he was Maharaja and before, such as in a serial story entitled Genta Parahyangan: Senandung Darah Di Tanah Tumapel, 2025.

In games

- Ken Arok’s Sword appears as a featured weapon in the RPG Astrae Oratio, referencing the cursed Kris forged by Mpu Gandring.

== See also ==
- Kediri (historical kingdom)
- Singasari
- Ki Ageng Pamanahan (in Indonesian)
- Greater India
- Indosphere
- Hinduism in Indonesia
