= Panji Tohjaya =

King of Singhasari
- Reign: 1248 – 1250
- Predecessor: Anusapati
- Successor: Vishnuvardhana
- Died: c. 1250
Names
- Panji Tohjaya
- Dynasty: Rajasa dynasty
- Father: Ken Arok
- Mother: Ken Umang

Panji Tohjaya was the third king of Singhasari. He was the son of Ken Arok and his first wife, Ken Umang. After his father was killed by his half-brother, Anusapati, he took revenge and assumed his father's throne in 1248. He only ruled for several months before his nephews, Ranggawuni, son of Anusapati, and Mahisha Champaka, son of Mahisa Wonga Teleng, another son of Ken Arok, rebelled, took the throne and reigned together, the first under the name Vishnuvardhana, the second under that of Narasimhamurti.

== Bibliography ==
- Cœdès (1968), The Indianized States of Southeast Asia, Honolulu: University of Hawaii Press
