= Edward S. Anthoine =

American politician and lawyer

Edward S. Anthoine (c. 1882 – October 29, 1942) was an American politician and lawyer from Maine. Anthoine, a Republican from Portland, served one term (1925–26) in the Maine Senate representing Cumberland County. In December 1927, Governor Owen Brewster appointed him to reporter of decisions of the Maine Supreme Judicial Court.

== Personal life ==
Anthoine graduated from Bowdoin College (Class of 1902). His wife, Sara P. Anthoine (1887 – 1965), was a noted activist for women's suffrage. They had one child, Robert. Anthoine died following a brief illness in Togus, Maine, on October 29, 1942, at the age of 60.
