= Safsaf massacre =

1948 killing of Palestinians by Israeli forces

- Part of 1948 Arab–Israeli War and Operation Hiram
- Date: October 29, 1948; 77 years ago
- Location: Safsaf; 33°0′40″N 35°26′46″E
- Type: Massacre, war rape
- Participants: Israel Defense Forces
- Outcome: Village was occupied, and a massacre perpetrated against those in the village
- Deaths: 50–70

The Safsaf massacre took place on 29 October 1948, following the capture of the Palestinian Arab village of Safsaf in the Galilee by the Israel Defense Forces (IDF). The village was defended by the Arab Liberation Army's Second Yarmuk Battalion.

Safsaf was the first village to fall in Operation Hiram, the aim of which, according to the IDF, was to "destroy the enemy in the central Galilee 'pocket,' to take control of the whole of the Galilee and to establish a defense line on the country's northern border". The village was attacked by two platoons of armored cars and a tank company from the 7th Brigade, and a fierce battle lasted from the evening until seven o'clock the next morning.

Evidence of a massacre in which 50–70 villagers were killed by the IDF comes from several contemporaneous Israeli government sources and Arab oral history. The evidence suggests that 52 men had their hands tied, were shot and killed, and were buried in a pit. Several women reported allegations of rape by the IDF, including the rape and murder of a 14-year-old girl. At least two internal inquiries were initiated during 1948–49 by the IDF, but their reports remain classified.

== Massacre ==
=== Israeli accounts ===
A key source are the diaries of Yosef Nachmani, a senior officer in the Haganah, who was also director of the Jewish National Fund in Eastern Galilee from 1935 until 1965. He visited Safsaf or the area around it on 6 November, accompanied by the Israeli Minority Affairs minister Bechor-Shalom Sheetrit. The men were briefed by Immanuel Friedman, a representative of the Minority Affairs ministry, who talked about "the cruel acts of our soldiers." The Nachmani diary was released by the Israeli government in the early 1980s. It had been published before, but with the passages about the massacre omitted.

On 6 November 1948, Nachmani wrote: "In Safsaf, after ... the inhabitants had raised a white flag, the [soldiers] collected and separated the men and women, tied the hands of fifty-sixty fellahin [peasants] and shot and killed them and buried them in a pit. Also, they raped several women ..." After listing alleged atrocities in other villages—Eilaboun, Farradiyya, and Saliha—Nachmani writes: "Where did they come by such a measure of cruelty, like Nazis? ... Is there no more humane way of expelling the inhabitants than by such methods?"

Moshe Erem reported on the massacre to a meeting of the Mapam Political Committee but his words were removed from the minutes. According to notes of the meeting taken by Aharon Cohen, Erem spoke of: "Safsaf 52 men tied together with a rope. Pushed down a well and shot. 10 killed. Women pleaded for mercy. 3 cases of rape ... A girl of 14 raped. Another four killed."

=== Arab accounts ===
The Israeli accounts in broad detail are supported by Arab witnesses who told their stories to historians. According to Nafez Nazzal, who interviewed survivors in Ain al-Hilweh camp in 1973, witnesses spoke of four rapes and the murder of about 70 men. Villagers said that when the attack began on the village, the militiamen were braced to defend it but were surprised by a three-pronged assault. One militiaman said later: "We did not expect them to fight on three fronts. When none of the Arab armies joined the fighting, we retreated, together with the ALA volunteers to Lebanon. We left behind most of the villagers, many dead or injured ..."

Those left behind said that Israeli soldiers had entered Safsaf around sunrise and ordered the villagers to line up in a spot in the northern part of the village. One villager told Nazzal: "As we lined up, a few Jewish soldiers ordered four girls to accompany them to carry water for the soldiers. Instead, they took them to our empty houses and raped them. About seventy of our men were blindfolded and shot to death, one after the other, in front of us. The soldiers took their bodies and threw them on the cement covering of the village's spring and dumped sand on them." In later days, Israeli troops visited the village, telling the inhabitants that they should forget what had occurred and could stay in their homes. But they began to leave under cover of the night towards Lebanon, about four at a time, until Safsaf was empty.

== See also ==
- Depopulated Palestinian locations in Israel
- List of massacres committed during the 1948 Arab-Israeli war
- List of massacres in Israel
