= Kidal Temple =

Hindu temple in Indonesia

Coordinates: 8°02′S 112°43′E

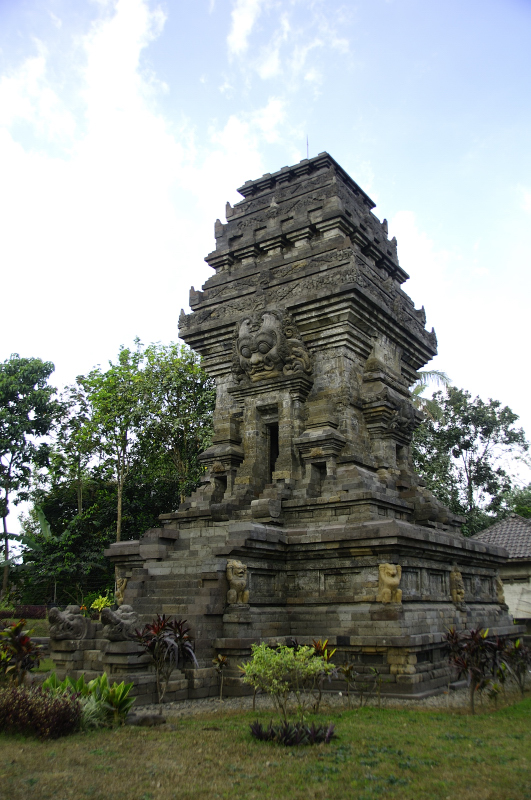
Kidal temple

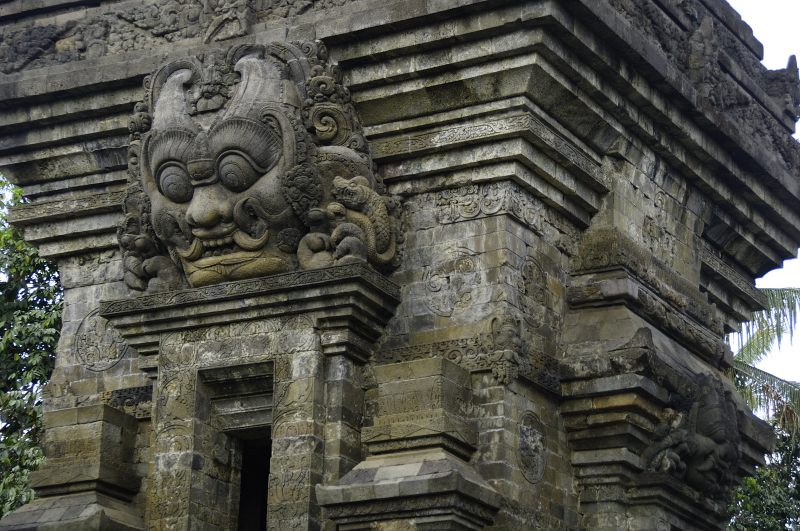
Detail of Kala and Makaras carved on lintel of Kidal temple portal

Kidal (Indonesian: Candi Kidal) is a Hindu temple built under the Singhasari dynasty. It is situated in the Rejokidal village in the Tumpang district of East Java, approximately 20 km east of Malang. The temple was built around 1248 and restored in the 1990s. The temple is composed of three levels that are situated on a raised platform. At the foot of the temple, three Javanese masks depict the story of Garuda. The temple may have encased an image of Shiva depicted by the portrait of the Singhasari king, Anusapati.

== See also ==
- Singhasari temple
- Trowulan
- Candi of Indonesia
