= Singhasari =

Javanese Kingdom (1222–1292)

Singhasari ꦱꦶꦔ꧀ꦲꦱꦫꦶ (Javanese)
- 1222–1292
- Expansion of Singhasari during the reign of Kertanegara
- Capital: Tumapel, later called Kutaraja Singhasari (modern outskirt Malang)
- Common languages: Old Javanese, Sanskrit
- Religion: Hinduism; Buddhism
- Government: Monarchy
- Maharaja
  - 1222–1227: Ken Arok
  - 1227–1248: Anusapati
  - 1248–1250: Panji Tohjaya
  - 1250–1268: Visnuvardhana
  - 1268–1292: Kertanagara
- History
  - Battle of Genter: 1222
  - Jayakatwang rebellion: 1292
- Currency: Native gold and silver coins
Preceded by	Succeeded by
Kediri (historical kingdom)	Majapahit; Kingdom of Singapura
- Today part of: Indonesia; Singapore; Malaysia

Singhasari (Javanese: ꦏꦫꦠꦺꦴꦤ꧀ꦱꦶꦔ꧀ꦲꦱꦫꦶ, romanized: Karaton Singhasari or Karaton Singosari, Indonesian: Kerajaan Singasari), also known as Tumapel, was a Javanese Hindu-Buddhist kingdom located in east Java between 1222 and 1292. The kingdom succeeded the Kingdom of Kediri as the dominant kingdom in eastern Java. The kingdom's name is cognate to the Singosari district of Malang Regency, located several kilometres north of Malang City.

== Etymology ==
Singhasari (alternate spelling: Singosari) was mentioned in several Javanese manuscripts, including Pararaton. According to tradition, the name was given by Ken Arok during the foundation of the new kingdom to replace its old name, Tumapel, located in a fertile highland valley which today corresponds to the area in and around Malang city. It derives from Sanskrit word singha which means "lion" and sari which in Old Javanese could mean either "essence" or "to sleep". Thus Singhasari could be translated as "essence of lion" or "sleeping lion". Although the lion is not an endemic animal of Java, the symbolic depiction of lions is common in Indonesian culture, attributed to the influence of Hindu-Buddhist symbolism.

== Foundation ==
Singhasari was founded by Ken Arok (1182–1227/1247), whose story is a popular folktale in Central and East Java. Most of Ken Arok's life story and the early history of Singhasari were taken from the Pararaton account, which also incorporates some mythical aspects. Ken Arok was an orphan born of a mother named Ken Endok and an unknown father (some tales stated he was a son of the god Brahma) in the Kediri kingdom's territory.

Ken Arok rose from being a servant of Tunggul Ametung, a regional ruler in Tumapel (present-day Malang) to becoming a ruler of Java from Kediri. He is considered the founder of the Rajasa dynasty of both the Singhasari and later the Majapahit line of monarchs. He killed Tunggul Ametung and was later assassinated by Anusapati, in revenge for killing his father, Tunggul Ametung. Ken Arok's son Panji Tohjaya assassinated Anusapati, but he in turn reigned only a few months in 1248 before his nephews revolted. These two, Ranga Wuni and Mahisha Champaka, ruled together under the names Vishnuvardhana and Narasimhamurti.

== Expansion ==
In the year 1275, King Kertanegara, the fifth ruler of Singhasari who had been reigning since 1268, launched a naval campaign northward towards the weak remains of the Srivijaya in response to continuous Ceylon pirate raids and Chola kingdom's invasion from India which conquered Srivijaya's Kedah in 1025. The strongest of these Malaya kingdoms was Jambi, which captured the Srivijaya capital in 1088, followed by the Dharmasraya Kingdom, and the Temasek Kingdom of Singapore.

The military force known as the Pamalayu expedition was led by Admiral Mahesa Anabrang (a.k.a. Adwaya Brahman) to the Malaya region, and was also intended to secure the Malayan strait, the ‘Maritime Silk Road’, against potential Mongol invasion and ferocious sea pirates. These Malayan kingdoms then pledged allegiance to the king. King Kertanegara had long wished to surpass Srivijaya as a regional maritime empire, controlling sea trade routes from China to India.

The Pamalayu expedition from 1275 to 1292, from the time of Singhasari to Majapahit, is chronicled in the Javanese scroll Nagarakrtagama. Singhasari's territory thus became Majapahit territory. In the year 1284, King Kertanegara led a hostile Pabali expedition to Bali, which integrated Bali into the Singhasari kingdom's territory. The king also sent troops, expeditions, and envoys to other nearby kingdoms such as the Sunda-Galuh Kingdom, Pahang Kingdom, Balakana Kingdom (Kalimantan/Borneo), and Gurun Kingdom (Maluku). He also established an alliance with the king of Champa (Vietnam).

King Kertanegara erased any Srivijayan influence from Java and Bali in 1290. However, the expansive campaigns exhausted most of the Kingdom's military forces and in the future would stir a murderous plot against the unsuspecting King Kertanegara.

== Conflict with the Mongols ==
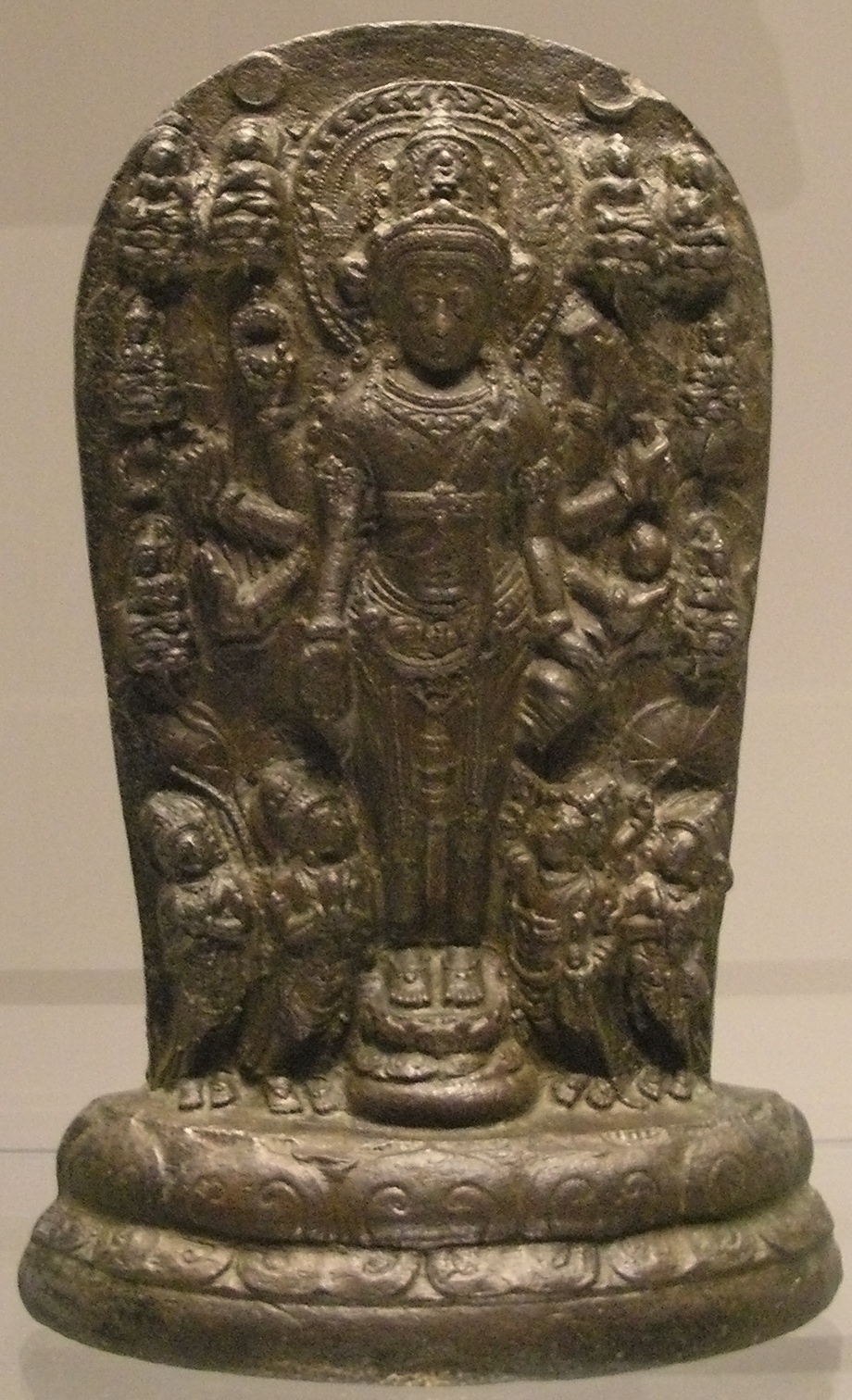
A mandala of Amoghapāśa from the Singhasari period

Singhasari, and its successor kingdom, Majapahit, were among the few kingdoms in Asia that were able to thwart an invasion by the Mongol horde by repelling a Mongol force in 1293. As the centre of the Malayan peninsula trade winds, the rising power, influence, and wealth of the Javanese Singhasari empire came to the attention of Kublai Khan of the Mongol Yuan dynasty based in China. Moreover, Singhasari had allied with Champa, another powerful state in the region. Both Java (Singhasari) and Champa were worried about Mongol expansion and raids against neighbouring states, such as their raid of Bagan in Burma.

Kublai Khan then sent emissaries demanding submission and tribute from Java. In 1280, Kublai Khan sent the first emissary to King Kertanegara, demanding Singhasari's submission and tribute to the great Khan. The demand was refused. The next year in 1281, the Khan sent another envoy, demanding the same, which was refused again. Eight years later, in 1289, the last envoy was sent to demand the same, and King Kertanegara refused to pay tribute.

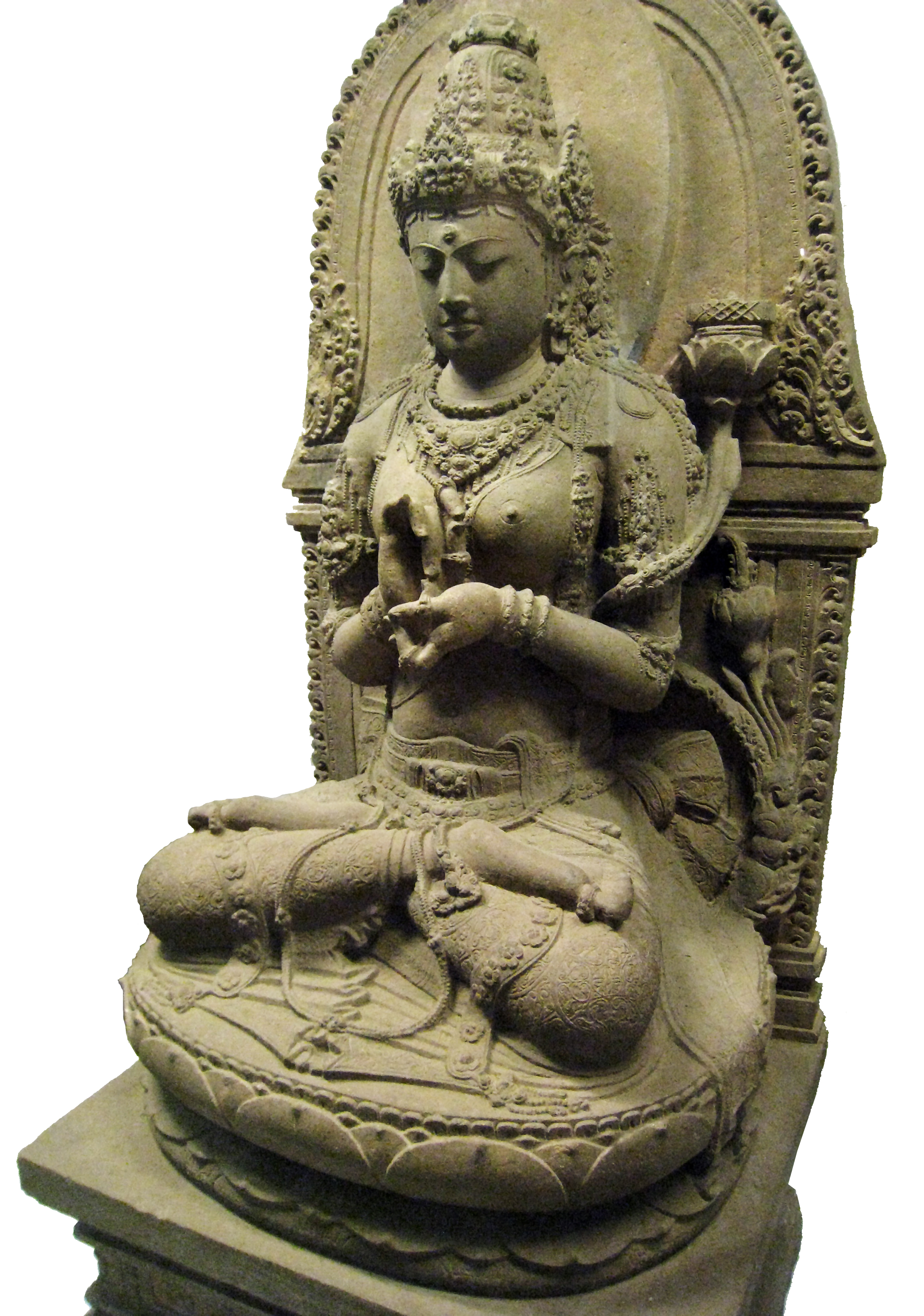
The serene beauty of Prajnaparamita statue found near Singhasari temple is believed to be the portrayal statue of Queen Ken Dedes, wife of Ken Arok (the collection of National Museum of Indonesia).

In the audition throne room of the Singhasari court, King Kertanegara humiliated the Khan's envoy by cutting and scarring the face of Meng Ki, one of the Mongols' envoys (some sources even state that the king cut the envoy's ear himself). The envoy returned to China with the answer – the scar – of the Javan king written on his face.

Enraged by this humiliation and the disgrace committed against his envoy and his patience, in late 1292 Kublai Khan sent 1,000 war junks for a punitive expedition that arrived off the coast of Tuban, Java in early 1293.

King Kertanegara, whose troops were now spread thin and located elsewhere, did not realize that a coup was being prepared by the former Kediri royal lineage.

== Fall of Singhasari ==
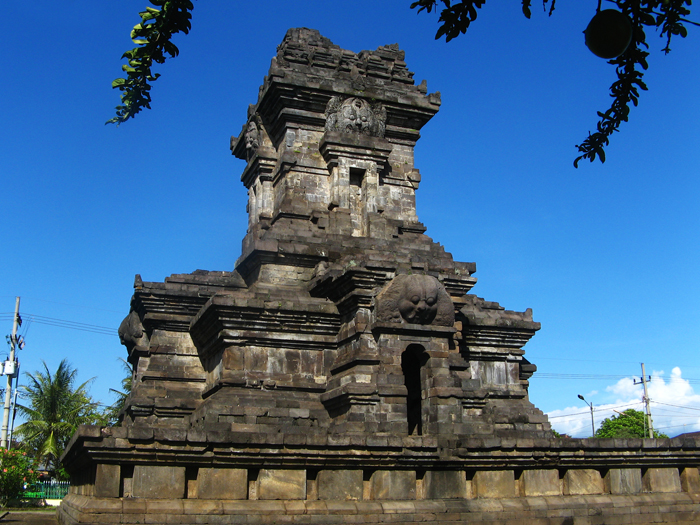
Singhasari temple built as a mortuary temple to honour Kertanegara, the last king of Singhasari.

In 1292, Regent Jayakatwang, a vassal king from the Kingdom of Daha (also known as Kediri or Gelang-gelang), prepared his army to conquer Singhasari and kill its king if possible, assisted by Arya Viraraja, a regent from Sumenep on the island of Madura.

The Kediri (Gelang-gelang) army attacked Singhasari simultaneously from both north and south. The king only realized the invasion from the north and sent his son-in-law, Nararya Sanggramawijaya, informally known as 'Raden Wijaya', northward to vanquish the rebellion. The northern attack was put at bay, but the southern attackers successfully remained undetected until they reached and sacked the unprepared capital city of Kutaraja. Jayakatwang usurped and killed Kertanagara during the Tantra sacred ceremony, thus bringing an end to the Singhasari kingdom.

Having learned of the fall of the Singhasari capital of Kutaraja due to Kediri's treachery, Raden Wijaya tried to defend Singhasari but failed. He and his three colleagues, Ranggalawe, Sora, and Nambi, went to exile in favour of the same regent (Bupati) Arya Wiraraja of Madura, Nambi's father, who then turned his back to Jayakatwang. With Arya Wiraraja's patronage, Raden Wijaya, pretending to submit to King Jayakatwang, won favour from the new monarch of Kediri, who permitted him to open a new settlement north of Mount Arjuna, the Tarik forest. In this wilderness, Wijaya found many bitter Maja fruits, so it was called Majapahit (literally meaning “bitter Maja”), the future capital of the empire.

== The beginning of Majapahit empire ==
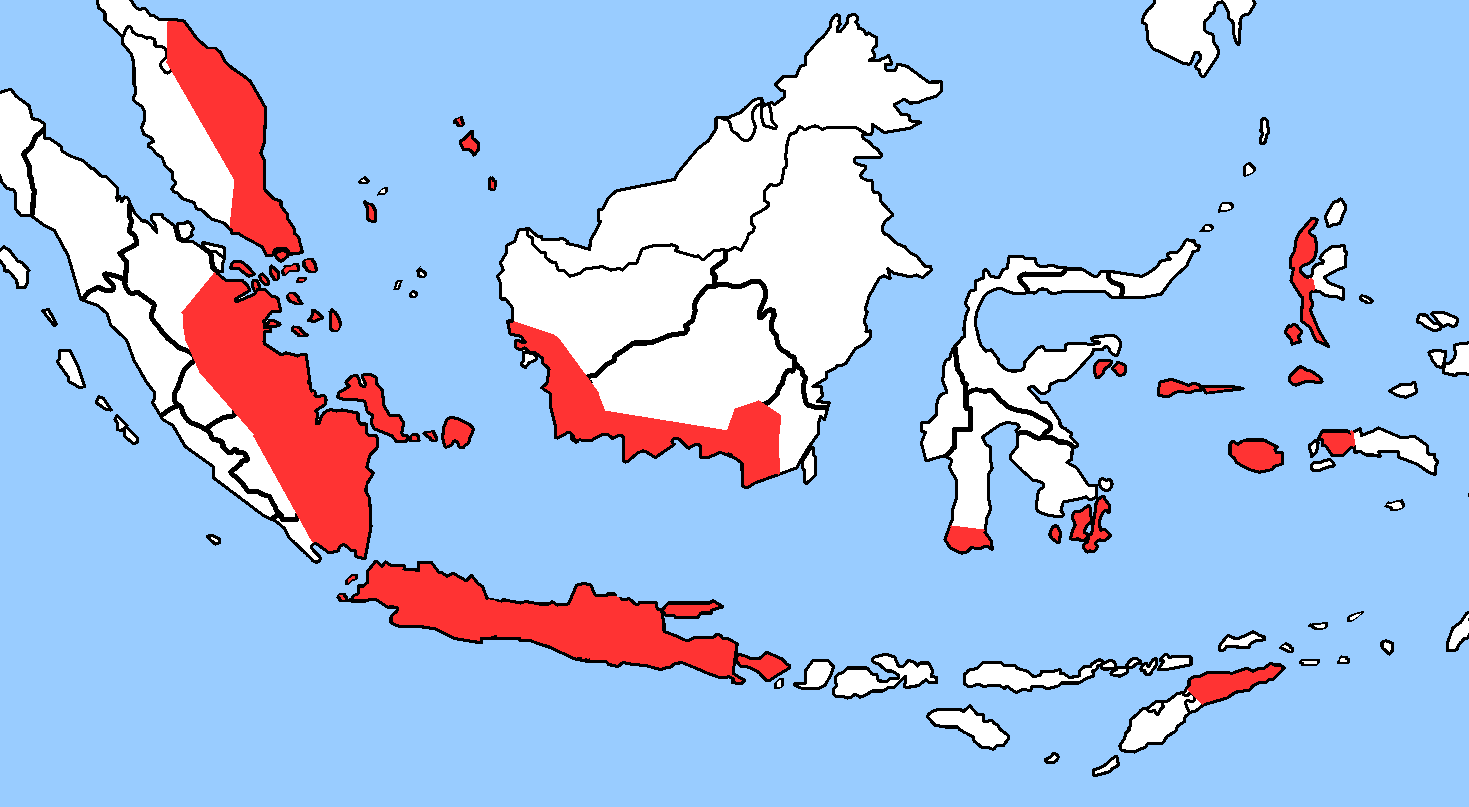
The land of Singhasari when at its peak during 1291

In early 1293, the Mongol naval forces arrived on the north coast of Java (near Tuban) and on the Brantas River mouth to flank what they thought was Singhasari. Raden Wijaya found the opportunity to use the unsuspecting Mongols to overthrow Jayakatwang. Raden Wijaya's army allied with the Mongols in March 1293 and a battle ensued between Mongol forces against Daha forces in the creek bed of Kali Mas River, a distributary of Brantas River, which was followed by the battle of Mongol forces against Daha forces that attacked the Majapahit regional army led by Raden Wijaya. The Mongols then stormed Daha and Jayakatwang finally surrendered and was executed.

Once Jayakatwang was eliminated, Raden Vijaya then turned his troops on his former Mongol allies, forcing them to withdraw from the island of Java on 31 May 1293.

The victor, Prince Wijaya, son-in-law of Kertanegara, the last Singhasari king, then ascended the throne as Kertajasa Jayawardhana, the first king of the great Majapahit Empire, on 12 November 1293.

== Rulers of Singhasari ==
Genealogy diagram of Rajasa dynasty, the royal family of Singhasari and Majapahit. Rulers are highlighted with period of reign.

- Ken Arok 1222–1227
- Anusapati 1227–1248
- Panji Tohjaya 1248
- Vishnuvardhana-Narasimhamurti 1248–1268
- Kertanegara 1268–1292

== Family Tree ==
Family Tree of Singhasari Kings

♀ Ken Umang	Sri Ranggah; Rajasa^{(1)} r. 1222-1227/47	♀ Ken Dedes	Tunggul; Ametung
Panji; Tohjaya^{(3)} r. 1248	Mahisa Wong; Teleng	Bhatara; Anusapati^{(2)} r. 1227/47-1248
Bhatara; Narasinghamurti	Jayawisnu wardhana^{(4)} r. 1248-1268
Dyah Lembu; Tal	Kertanagara^{(5)} r. 1268-1292
Majapahit; Empire

== Contemporary inscriptions ==
=== Gondang inscription ===
The Gondang Inscription is an in-situ inscription dating back to the era of the Singhasari Kingdom which was more recently discovered in 2017 in the middle of rice fields within Rejoso Hamlet, Gondang Village, Gondang District, Mojokerto Regency, East Java. The inscription was founded by local residents and was written in the Old Javanese language bearing the date 1197 Saka or 1275 AD.

== See also ==
- List of monarchs of Java
- Kidal Temple
- Jago Temple
- Jawi Temple
