= Dara Petak =

Consort of Raden Wijaya

- Indreswari; Stri Tinuheng Pura
- Born: Dara Pethak "white dove" Kingdom of Dharmasraya
- Spouse: Kertarajasa Jayawardhana
- Issue: Jayanagara
- House: Mauli (by birth); Rajasa (by marriage)
- Father: Tribhuwanaraja

Dara Petak or Dara Pethak, also known in her formal name as Indreswari, was the consort of King Kertarajasa Jayawardhana, the founder of Majapahit kingdom. She was a Dharmasraya princess from Sumatra and the only non-Javanese wife of Kertarajasa, and also the mother of Jayanegara, the second monarch of Majapahit. Tradition mentioned her as a woman of exceptional beauty.

The name Dara Pethak in old Malay means "white dove", while her other name Indreswari in Sanskrit means "the consort of Indra" and it was acquired after her marriage to Majapahit first king.

== Early life ==
She was the daughter of King Srimat Tribhuwanaraja Mauliawarmadewa of Dharmasraya Kingdom in Sumatra, and was sent to Java to be betrothed to Singhasari King. This Sumatran kingdom was held as vassal of Singhasari in 1286. According to Pararaton, ten days after the expulsion of Mongol forces from Java, the Pamalayu expedition led by Mahisa Anabrang returned to Java. The expedition was sent by Singhasari King Kertanegara in 1275 to conquer Sumatra. The returning Javanese troops brought two Malay princesses, Dara Jingga and Dara Petak to be presented for Kertanagara.

The two princesses was originally intended for Kertanagara, however because the Singhasari King has died, his heir Raden Wijaya took Dara Petak in hand of marriage instead, while her sister Dara Jingga was betrothed to Adwayawarman, a Javanese high officials (Rakryan Mahamantri Dyah Adwayabrahma) of the Singhasari, who was sent to transport the statue of Amoghapasa to the Dharmasraya kingdom.

== As the king's consort ==
Within Majapahit palace, Dara Petak cleverly pleased the king, won his favour and subsequently become the king's favourite consort. She acquired the title Stri tinuheng pura, or the most honored wife in the palace. According to Nagarakretagama, Raden Wijaya already had four wives, Tribhuwaneswari, Prajnaparamita, Narendra Duhita, and Gayatri Rajapatni; all of them were Singhasari princesses, the daughters of Kertanagara. According to Pararaton, Dara Petak was promoted to honorable title because she was the only wife that produced male heir for the king, prince Jayanegara. According to Nagarakretagama, the name of Jayanagara's mother is Indreswari, so it is assumed that this was the new official name of Dara Petak after her marriage to the king.

The coronation of Jayanegara as the Prince of Daha in 1295 was recorded in Sukamerta inscription (1296). In Kertarajasa inscription (1305), Jayanegara was mentioned as the son of Tribhuwaneswari, the prime queen and first wife of Raden Wijaya. To reconcile these records, some historians suggest that Jayanegara was the biological son of Indreswari or Dara Petak, and he was later being adopted by the childless queen consort Tribhuwaneswari, in order to be promoted as the heir of the throne. Jayanegara become the successor of King Kertarajasa.
