= Bijayendrawarman =

Yuwaraja of the Malayapura kingdom

Bijayendrawarman was the name of one a yuwaraja (vice king, or crown prince) of the Malayapura kingdom, who ruled in the 14th century in the Pasaman Regency, West Sumatra, Indonesia. Bijayendrawarman's name is written in Lubuk Layang inscription, found in Pancahan village, in Rao Selatan district of Pasaman. It was stated that he built a stupa, in a place called Parwatapuri.

When viewed paleographically, the writing on the inscription is similar to other writings issued during the reign of King Adityawarman. This means that there could be two yuwaraja at the same time; namely Ananggawarman as mentioned in the Saruaso II inscription, and Bijayendrawarman himself which could be another son of King Adityawarman. Bijayendrawarman's seat of government was located in the kingdom's border region (Pasaman), that might be indicating that he was a younger child, who was appointed to rule the area.

Another possibility would be that Bijayendrawarman was associated to Akarendrawarman, the royal ruler before Adityawarman.

== See also ==
- Mauli dynasty
- Pagaruyung Kingdom
