= Mauli =

Dynasty of kings in modern-day Sumatra

Mauli was a dynasty of kings that ruled the Bhumi Malayu or Dharmasraya kingdom, centered in the Batanghari river system (today Jambi and West Sumatra provinces, Sumatra), from the 11th century to the 14th century. Most Mauli kings were Mahayana—Vajrayana Buddhists.

== History ==
The dynasty appeared almost two centuries after the fall of the Sailendra dynasty that ruled Srivijaya, after the Chola invasion in 1025, led by Rajendra from Tamil Nadu, India. It seems that the family was once the member of the Srivijayan mandala and stepped into the power to rule the former Srivijayan mandala which included Sumatra and Malay Peninsula. The dynasty was based on the Batanghari river system, initially centered in Muaro Jambi, and considered as the successor state of Srivijaya. In the later period, the kingdom's capital shifted inland upstream from Batanghari to Dharmasraya, and later moved further inland to Pagaruyung in present-day West Sumatra province.

== List of rulers ==
Following is the list of Mauli kings that ruled Bhumi Malayu:

Year	King's name	Stylized title	Capital / center of power	Inscription, embassies, and events
1183	Trailokyaraj	Srimat Trailokyaraja Maulibhusana Warmadewa	Dharmasraya	Grahi inscription dated 1183 in Grahi (Chaiya), Southern Thailand Malay Peninsula.
1286	Tribhuvanaraj	Srimat Tribhuvanaraja Mauli Warmadewa	Dharmasraya	Pamalayu expedition launched by Singhasari from Java, Padang Roco inscription dated 1286 in today Dharmasraya Regency.
1300	Akrendravarman	Sri Maharajadhiraja Srimat Sri Akarendrawarman	Dharmasraya or Pagaruyung or Suruaso	Suruaso inscription in today Tanah Datar Regency.
1347	Adityavarman	Srimat Sri Udayadityawarman Pratapaparakrama Maulimali Warmadewa	Pagaruyung or Suruaso	Moving the capital to Pagaruyung or Suruaso, inscription on Amoghapasa dated 1347 in today Dharmasraya Regency, Kuburajo inscription in today Tanah Datar Regency.
1375	Ananggavarman		Pagaruyung or Suruaso	Batusangkar inscription today Tanah Datar Regency.
?	Vijayandravarman		Parwatapuri (Rao Mapattunggul or Pasaman?)	Erected stupa at Parwatapuri, possibly Tarung-Tarung temple and Pancahan in Rao Mapattunggul, or a temple ruin (biaro) in Tanjung Medan, Petok village, Panti Panti, Pasaman Regency. Lubuk Layang inscription

== See also ==
- History of Indonesia
- Melayu Kingdom
- Srivijaya
- Malay
