= Lubuk Layang inscription =

14th century inscription found in Sumatra, Indonesia

Lubuk Layang inscription, also known as Kubu Sutan inscription, is an inscription found in 1970 in Kubu Sutan, Lubuk Layang, Rao Selatan district, Pasaman Regency, of West Sumatra, Indonesia.

The inscription is carved into a sloping sandstone, partially submerged in the ground. It is 85 cm tall on the non-submerged side, and 43 cm on the immersed side, with 42 cm wide and 18 cm thick. The writing is on both front and back sides, the front contains 9 lines and the back contains 7 or 8 lines, and written in a mixed language of Old Malay and Old Javanese. Much of the writing is difficult to read because it is already worn out. The inscription is not dated, but paleographically it is viewed to be from the reign of King Adityawarman (14th century CE).

The content of this inscription mentions a vice king/crown prince (Sanskrit: yuwaraja) named Bijayendrawarman, who made a temple (stupa) in a place called Parwatapuri. This suggests the possibility of a government system similar to that of Majapahit at that time, in which younger children of a king were sent to the borders to become local rulers.

== Text ==
Text of the inscription as read by de Casparis, as follows:

A. (front side)

1. . . . śrī /
2. pūrṇṇa .. nira
3. ......surimadana
4. dhr . . iḥ // O // O //
5. _______ amarawijaya yauwāsutajata
6. tendrawarma . satatawibhawa pujāpa-
7. / dhid. . itatārasadawaca ti
8. / ṛṣ a[r.ārsa]-bhakti di mātapitāra sakala
9. / prāptiswastha śanta . . tan

B. (back side)

1. sugatayawāta /
2. nṛpati Bijayawarmma
3. namokṣam // O // O //
4. srī yauwarāja Bijayendrasekhara
5. . . kṛtya . astu paripūrṇṇasobhitā / ku
6. na pamuja di pitāmahā darādi
7. srī Indrakīlaparwwatapurī // O //

== See also ==
- Adityawarman
- Mauli dynasty
- Pagaruyung Kingdom
