= Dara Jingga =

Malay Dharmasraya princess

- Born: Dara Jingga "scarlet dove" Kingdom of Dharmasraya
- Spouse: Adwayabrahma
- Issue: Adityawarman
- House: Mauli
- Father: Tribhuwanaraja

Dara Jingga, was one of the Malay Dharmasraya princess who was intended to be betrothed to Javanese King Kertanegara of Singasari after the Pamalayu expedition 1275–1293.

Dara Jingga was the older sister of Dara Petak, the consort of Kertarajasa Jayawardhana, King of Majapahit. She married Adwayabrahma (Rakryan Mahamantri), and the mother of Adityawarman, later become the king of her native kingdom Dharmasraya in Sumatra. The name Dara Jingga in old Malay means "scarlet dove".

== Early life ==
Dara Jingga was the daughter of King Srimat Tribhuwanaraja Mauliawarmadewa of the Dharmasraya Kingdom in Sumatra, and, along with her sister, was taken to Java to wed the Singhasari King. The Dharmasraya kingdom may have had an alliance with Singhasari in order to face the Mongol invasion.

According to Pararaton, ten days after the expulsion of Mongol forces from Java, the Pamalayu expedition led by Mahisa Anabrang returned to Java. The expedition was sent by Singhasari King Kertanegara in 1275 to conquer Sumatra militarily and diplomatically. The returning Javanese troops brought two Malay princesses, two siblings Dara Jingga and Dara Petak to be presented for Kertanagara.

The two princesses was originally intended for Kertanagara, however because the Singhasari King died, his heir Raden Wijaya took Dara Petak as his wife. According to Pararaton, Dara Jingga was mentioned as sira alaki dewa — she who has a husband named dewa — referring to Adwayawarman, highly likely to be one of the participating Singhasari officials (Dyah Adwayabrahma from Padang Roco inscription) in the Pamalayu expedition that brought the Amoghapasa statue to Dharmasraya. He was sometimes also identified as Mahisa Anabrang, the leader of the Pamalayu expedition, as he bore the high ranking title of rakryan mahamentri, although this hypothesis needs further evidence. According to Pararaton, Dara Jingga lived in the Majapahit capital city and bore a son Tuhanku Janaka who became Malay king in Sumatra with title Mantrolot Warmadewa, identified as Adityawarman.

== Return to Sumatra ==
After lived for some period in Majapahit, Dara Jingga returned to her homeland, Dharmasraya kingdom in Sumatra. She probably came back to accompany her son, Adityawarman, appointed by Majapahit King as the ruler of Sumatra under protection of Majapahit mandala. In Sumatra, Dara Jingga holds important position, according to Minangkabau Tambo (chronicle), Dara Jingga is identified as the first Bundo Kanduang, the matriarch of Minangkabau society.
