= Melayu Kingdom =

Kingdom based in Sumatra (671–692; 1028–1347)

- before 671–692; 1028–1347
- Map of early Malay polities locating the Melayu Kingdom next to Jambi
- Capital: Minanga; Dharmasraya; Pagaruyung
- Common languages: Old Malay
- Religion: Buddhism, Hinduism
- Government: Monarchy
- Maharaja
  - 1183: Trailokyaraja
  - 1286 – 1316: Tribhuwanaraja
  - 1316 – 1347: Akarendrawarman
- History
  - Earliest mention: 671
  - Annexed by Srivijaya: 692
  - Independence restored: 1028
  - Affiliated with Majapahit: 1347
- Currency: Gold and silver coins
Preceded by
Srivijaya
Succeeded by
Pagaruyung Kingdom
Majapahit Empire
Kingdom of Singapura
- Today part of: Indonesia; Singapore; Malaysia; Thailand

The Melayu Kingdom (also known as Malayu, Dharmasraya Kingdom or the Jambi Kingdom; Chinese: 末羅瑜國; pinyin: Mòluóyú Guó, reconstructed Middle Chinese pronunciation mat-la-yu kwok) was a classical Buddhist kingdom located in what is now the Indonesian province of West Sumatra and Jambi.

The primary sources for much of the information on the kingdom are the New History of the Tang, and the memoirs of the Chinese Buddhist monk Yijing who visited in 671. The state was "absorbed" by Srivijaya by 692, but had "broken away" by the end of the 12th century according to Zhao Rukuo. The exact location of the kingdom is the subject of study among historians. One theory is that the kingdom was established around present-day Jambi on Sumatra, Indonesia, approximately 300 km north of Palembang. According to this theory, it was founded by ethnic groups in the Batanghari river area and gold traders from the Minangkabau hinterland of Pagarruyung.

== Etymology ==
There are different theories for the origin of the word Melayu ('Malay'). One theory suggests that it is derived from the Javanese terms melayu or mlayu (to steadily accelerate or to run), to describe the strong current of a river in Sumatra that today bears the name Sungai Melayu ('Melayu river') which is the right branch going upriver of Batang Hari whose watershed reaches Pagarruyung. The name was later possibly adopted by the Melayu Kingdom, as it is common for people in the region to be known by the name of the river on which they settled.

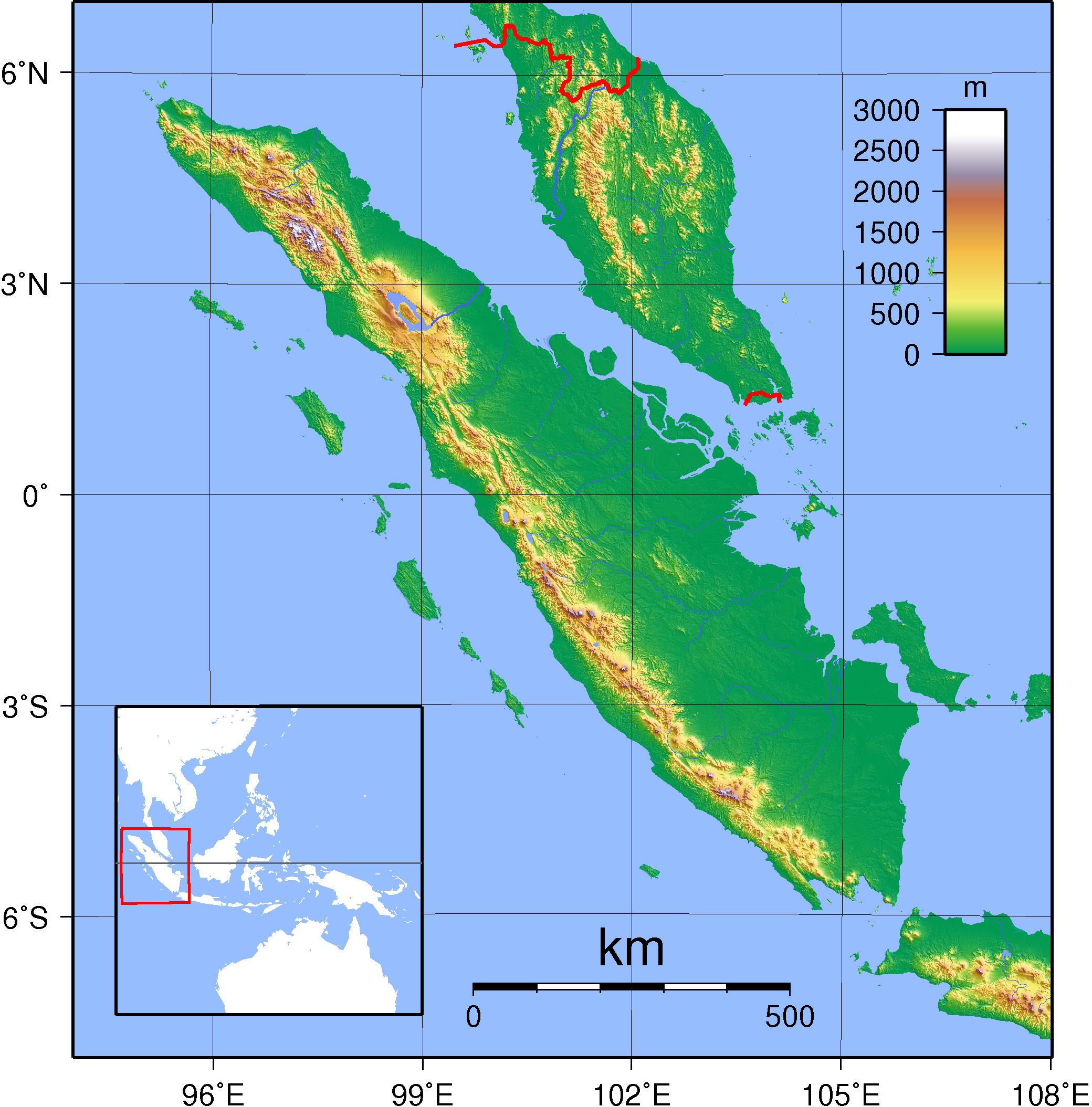
The Topography of Sumatra shows the Barisan Mountains running from north to the south.

Another theory holds that it originated from the Tamil words Malay and ur meaning "mountain or cave" and "city, land", respectively. It could possibly referred to Barisan Mountains, the mountain range in Sumatra.

An early literary appearance can be found in chapter 48, Vayu Purana, where the word "Malayadvipa", which means "mountainous island", is described as one of the provinces in the eastern sea that was full of gold and silver. Some scholars equate the term with Sumatra, but several Indian scholars believe the term may refer to the Malay Peninsula, which is evidence in the formation of Titiwangsa range that runs down the length of Peninsular Malaysia. The area around this mountainous range is known to be rich with gold mineralization, which befits the description of Malayadvipa.

Then, the term "Maleu-Kolon" was used in Ptolemy's Geographia which is believed to have originated from the Tamil term malayakolam or malaikurram, referring to a geographical part of peninsula. In 7th century, the first use of the term for a nation or a kingdom was recorded by Yijing.

The East Javanese Anjukladang inscription, dated from 937 CE in Mataram kingdom, stated that the Sima status was awarded to the Anjukladang village and a jayastambha (victory monument) was later upgraded to a temple, the monument was erected in recognition of their service on repelling the invading forces from Malayu. The temple mentioned here is probably the Candi Lor (made of bricks and now in ruins) located in Candirejo village in Nganjuk Regency. The mentioning of invading Malayu forces refers to the old term "Sumatran Malayu Kingdom", which probably refers to Srivijaya. This means that by the 10th century, the Javanese identified their Sumatra-based enemy as "Malayu" or at least the "Malay soldiers of Srivijaya".

An inscription on the south wall of the 11th century Brihadeeswarar Temple also made a reference to Malaiyur, a kingdom that had "a strong mountain for its rampart" during the Chola invasion of Srivijaya period. This referred to Chola invaders during Rajendra Chola I's campaign.

In the later Yuan dynasty (1271–1368) and Ming dynasty (1368–1644), the word Ma-La-Yu was mentioned often in Chinese historical texts — with changes in spelling due to the time span between the dynasties — to refer to a nation near the southern sea. Among the terms used was "Bok-la-yu", "Mok-la-yu" (木剌由), Ma-li-yu-er (麻里予兒), Oo-lai-yu (巫来由 — traced from the written source of monk Xuanzang), and Wu-lai-yu (無来由). In the chronicle of Yuan dynasty, the word "Ma-li-yu-er" was mentioned in describing the Sukhothai's southward expansion against Malayu:

"..Animosity occurred between Siam and Ma-li-yu-er with both killing each other..."

In response to the Sukhothai's move, a Chinese envoy arrived at the Ram Khamhaeng's court in 1295 bearing an imperial order: "Keep your promise and do no evil to Ma-li-yu-er". This nation of "Ma-li-yu-er" that appeared in the Chinese record may also be the nation that was mentioned by the Venetian traveller Marco Polo (1254–1324) who lived during the same period. In The Travels of Marco Polo, he made a reference to a kingdom named "Malauir" in the Malay peninsula.

The word bhūmi Mālayu (literally "Land of Malayu") is inscribed on the Padang Roco Inscription, dated 1286, according to the inscription, bhūmi Mālayu is associated with the Dharmasraya kingdom. On the Amoghapasa inscription, dated 1347, the word Malayapura (literally "city of Malaya" or "kingdom of Malaya") was proclaimed by Adityawarman, again referring to Dharmasraya. The word "Melayu" is also mentioned in the Malay annals referring to a river in Sumatra:

"...Here now is the story of a city called Palembang in the land of Andelas. It was ruled by Dĕmang Lebar Daun, a descendant of Raja Shulan, and its river was the Muara Tatang. In the upper reaches of the Muara Tatang was a river called Mĕlayu, and on that river was a hill called Si-Guntang Mahameru..." CC Brown

"...There is a country in the land of Andalás named Paralembang, which is at present denominated Palembang, the raja of which was denominated Damang Lebar Dawn, (Chieftain Broad-leaf,) who derived his origin from Raja Sulan, (Chillan ?) whose great-grandson he was. The name of its river was Muartatang, into which falls another river named Sungey Malayu, near the source of which is a mountain named the mountain Sagantang Maha Miru..." J Leyden

For some time, the Melayu kingdom was identified by the Chinese as the successor to Srivijaya. As indicated when Sanfoqi sent a mission to China in 1028, but this would actually refer to Malayu-Jambi, not Srivijaya-Palembang. No Sanfoqi mission came to China between 1028–1077. This indicates that the mandala of Srivijaya had faded. It is very possible that Srivijaya had collapsed by 1025. In the following centuries, Chinese chronicles still refer to Sanfoqi, but this term probably refers to the Malayu-Jambi kingdom. The last epigraphic evidence that mentions the word Srivijaya comes from the Tanjore inscription of the Chola kingdom in 1030 or 1031.

== History ==
=== Yijing's account ===
The primary sources for the kingdom are the New History of the Tang, and the memoirs of the Chinese Buddhist monk Yijing who visited in 671.

On his route via Maritime Southeast Asia, Yijing visited Srivijaya twice where he stayed from 688 to 695, studying and translating the original texts in Sanskrit. Srivijaya appears to have been flourishing around the time of Yijing's visit, which he initially called "Bogha (室利佛逝)" during his first visit. At its greatest extent, the kingdom extended to Malayu, which seems to have been annexed or to have come spontaneously under the realm of Bogha prince. The whole country as well as the capital received the name "Sribogha" or Srivijaya. The change of the name Malayu to Sribogha is likely to have occurred before Yijing's time or during his stay there, for whenever he mentions Malayu by name, he added that "it is now changed to Sribogha".

The following extract from Yijing's work, The Great Tang Biographies of Eminent Monks who Sought the Dharma in the Western Regions (大唐西域求法高僧傳), further describes a route via Bogha and Malayu, which a monk named Wuxing(無行) have taken to Srivijaya:

(Wuxing) came to Bogha after a month's sail. The king received him very favourably. ... And the king respected him as a guest from the land of the son of heaven of the Great Tang. He went on board the king's ship to the country of Malayu and arrived there after fifteen days sail. Thence he went to Ka Cha, again after fifteen days. At the end of winter he changed ship and sailed to the west.

Further, for the determination of the location of Sribogha-Malayu, Yijing furnishes the following in his work A Record of Buddhist Practices Sent Home from the Southern Sea(南海寄歸內法傳):

In the country of Sribogha, we see the shadow of the gnomon(圭) become neither long nor short (i.e "remain unchanged" or "no shadow") in the middle of the eighth month (Autumnal equinox), and at midday no shadow falls from a man who is standing on that day, so it is in the middle of spring (Vernal equinox).

Thus it can be inferred that the country of Sribogha covered the place lying on the equator, and the whole county therefore must have covered the north east side of Sumatra, from the southern shore of Malacca, to the city of Palembang, extending at least five degrees, having the equatorial line at about the centre of the kingdom.

According to Yijing, Hinayana Buddhism was predominantly adopted in Srivijaya, represented for the most part by the Mulasarvastivada school, however there were few Mahayanists in Malayu. Gold seems to have been abundant in the kingdom, where people used to offer the Buddha a lotus flower of gold and used golden jars. Moreover, people of the kingdom wore a type of long cloth and used fragrant oil.

Further, Melayu had accessed to gold producing areas in the hinterland of Sumatra. This slowly increased the prestige of Melayu which traded various local goods, including gold, with foreigners.

The state was "absorbed" by Srivijaya by 692.

=== Golden age ===
Between 1079 and 1088, Chinese records show that Sanfoqi sent ambassadors from Jambi and Palembang. In 1079 in particular, an ambassador from Jambi and Palembang each visited China. Jambi sent two more ambassadors to China in 1082 and 1088. That would suggest that the centre of Sanfoqi frequently shifted between the two major cities during that period. The Chola expeditions as well as the changing trade routes weakened Palembang, allowing Jambi to take the leadership of Sanfoqi from the 11th century onwards.

By the 12th century, a new dynasty called Mauli rose as the paramount of Sanfoqi. The earliest reference to the new dynasty was found in the Grahi inscription from 1183 discovered in Chaiya (Grahi), Southern Thailand Malay Peninsula. The inscription bears the order of Maharaja Srimat Trailokyaraja Maulibhusana Warmadewa to the bhupati (regent) of Grahi named Mahasenapati Galanai to make a statue of Buddha weighing 1 bhara 2 tula with a value of 10 gold tamlin. The artist responsible for the creation of the statue is Mraten Sri Nano.

According to the Chinese Song dynasty book Zhu Fan Zhi, written around 1225 by Zhao Rugua, the two most powerful and richest kingdoms in the Southeast Asian archipelago were Sanfoqi and Java (Kediri), with the western part (Sumatra, the Malay Peninsula, and western Java/Sunda) under Sanfoqi's rule and the eastern part was under Kediri's domination. It says that the people in Java followed two religions, Buddhism and the religion of Brahmins (Hinduism), while the people of Sanfoqi followed Buddhism. The book describes the people of Java as being brave, short-tempered and willing to fight. It also notes that their favourite pastimes were cockfighting and pig fighting. The coins used as currency were made from a mixture of copper, silver and tin.

Zhu fan zhi also states that Java (Kediri) was ruled by a maharaja and included the following "dependencies": Pai-hua-yuan (Pacitan), Ma-tung (Mataram), Ta-pen (Tumapel, now Malang), Hi-ning (Dieng), Jung-ya-lu (Hujung Galuh, now Surabaya), Tung-ki (Note: Teng-che in source.) (Jenggi, West Papua), Ta-kang (Sumba), Huang-ma-chu (Southwest Papua), Ma-li (Bali), Kulun (Note: Niu-lun in source.) (Gurun, identified as Gorong or Sorong in West Papua or an island in Nusa Tenggara), Tan-jung-wu-lo (Tanjungpura in modern-day West Kalimantan, Borneo), Ti-wu (Timor), Pingya-i (Banggai in Sulawesi) and Wu-nu-ku (Maluku). Additionally, Zhao Rugua said that Sanfoqi "was still a great power at the beginning of the thirteenth century" with 15 colonies: Pong-fong (Pahang), Tong-ya-nong (Terengganu), Ling-ya-si-kia (Langkasuka), Kilan-tan (Kelantan), Fo-lo-an (Dungun, eastern part of Malay Peninsula, a town within state of Terengganu), Ji-lo-t'ing (Cherating), Ts'ien-mai (Semawe, Malay Peninsula), Pa-t'a (Sungai Paka, located in Terengganu of Malay Peninsula), Tan-ma-ling (Tambralinga, Ligor or Nakhon Si Thammarat, South Thailand), Kia-lo-hi (Grahi, (Krabi) northern part of Malay Peninsula), Pa-lin-fong (Palembang), Sin-t'o (Sunda), Lan-wu-li (Lamuri at Aceh), Kien-pi (Jambi) and Si-lan (Cambodia or Ceylon (?)).

=== Demise ===
Almost a century after taking over the role of Palembang as the centre of an empire, Jambi experienced a decline in influence. This was caused by a change of policy in 1178 by the Song dynasty to no longer accept ambassadors from Sanfotsi, and Jambi's inability to cope with the changing scenario. Instead of Jambi controlling the trade through a tributary system, traders were allowed to trade directly.

In 1275, Kertanegara, of the Singhasari Kingdom, took advantage of Melayu's decline and sent a military expedition to establish Javanese control over Melayu's realm in Sumatra. Mahesa Anabrang (or Kebo/Lembu Anabrang) was a general of Singhasari, who conquered Palembang and Jambi (Malayu) in 1288. However, embassies by Malayu were still being sent to China in 1299 and 1301.

According to George Coedes, by the beginning of the 14th century, Melayu "remained the only Sumatran state of some political importance and it had become the refuge of the Buddhist Dharmic Indian culture in opposition to the sultanates of the north that were already Islamised or in the process of becoming so".

The History of Ming in 1371 mentions three kings that divided the ancient territory of Srivijaya, whose center was then Jambi and according to their titles were heir to Malayu. There were still sending embassies in 1374 and 1375. One king who reigned in the Jambi region in 1376 received the title 'King of San-fo-ch'i' from China, even though the Javanese (Majapahit) had conquered this region. According to the chronicle, the Javanese became very angry as their supposed vassal displayed a tendency towards independence and so they made a punitive expedition to Palembang. The chronicle continues: "[San-fo-ch'i] became gradually poorer and no tribute was brought from this country any more."

=== Melayu's last prince Parameswara ===
In the year 1347, Tribhuwana Wijayatunggadewi, the Queen of Majapahit, delegated Adityawarman as the ruler of Melayu to prevent the revival of Srivijaya. Adityawarman later conquered Tanah Datar to take control of the gold trade and founded a kingdom in Pagaruyung. In the year 1377, the Majapahit defeated Palembang and ended efforts to revive Srivijaya. The last prince of Srivijayan origin, Parameswara (thought to be the same person as Iskandar Shah in the Malay Annals), fled to Temasik to seek refuge before moving farther north, where he founded what would become the Malacca Sultanate.

== See also ==
- Pamalayu expedition
- Dharmasraya
