= Adwayawarman =

Adwayawarman was the father of King Adityawarman of Malayapura kingdom (now in West Sumatra province, Indonesia) as mentioned in the Kuburajo I Inscription. His alias name was Adwayadwaja, as he was called in the Bukit Gombak Inscription.

Historian Slamet Muljana suspected that Adwayawarman was also the same person as Adwayabrahma, who was mentioned in the Padang Roco Inscription. Adwayabrahma was the name of one of the Javanese high officials (Rakryan Mahamantri) of the Singhasari kingdom, who was sent to transport the statue of Amoghapasha to the Dharmasraya kingdom. If this notion is right, Adityawarman was a king of Malayo-Javanese mixed blood.

It was told in the Javanese chronicle Pararaton (Book of Kings) that Dara Jingga, one of the Malay princesses who was brought back to Java with the Pamalayu expedition, was married to a Javanese nobleman (alaki Dewa). His son was called Tuhan Janaka or Sri Marmadewa, who finally reigned in Sumatra with the title Aji Mantrolot. However, there are no other explicit historical sources that can be used to confirm that the Dewa was Adwayawarman, or that his son Tuhan Janaka (or Sri Marmadewa, Aji Mantrolot) was indeed Adityawarman.
