= Tribhuwanaraja =

13th century king of the Melayu Kingdom

- Sri Maharaja Srimat Tribhuwanaraja Mauli Warmadewa
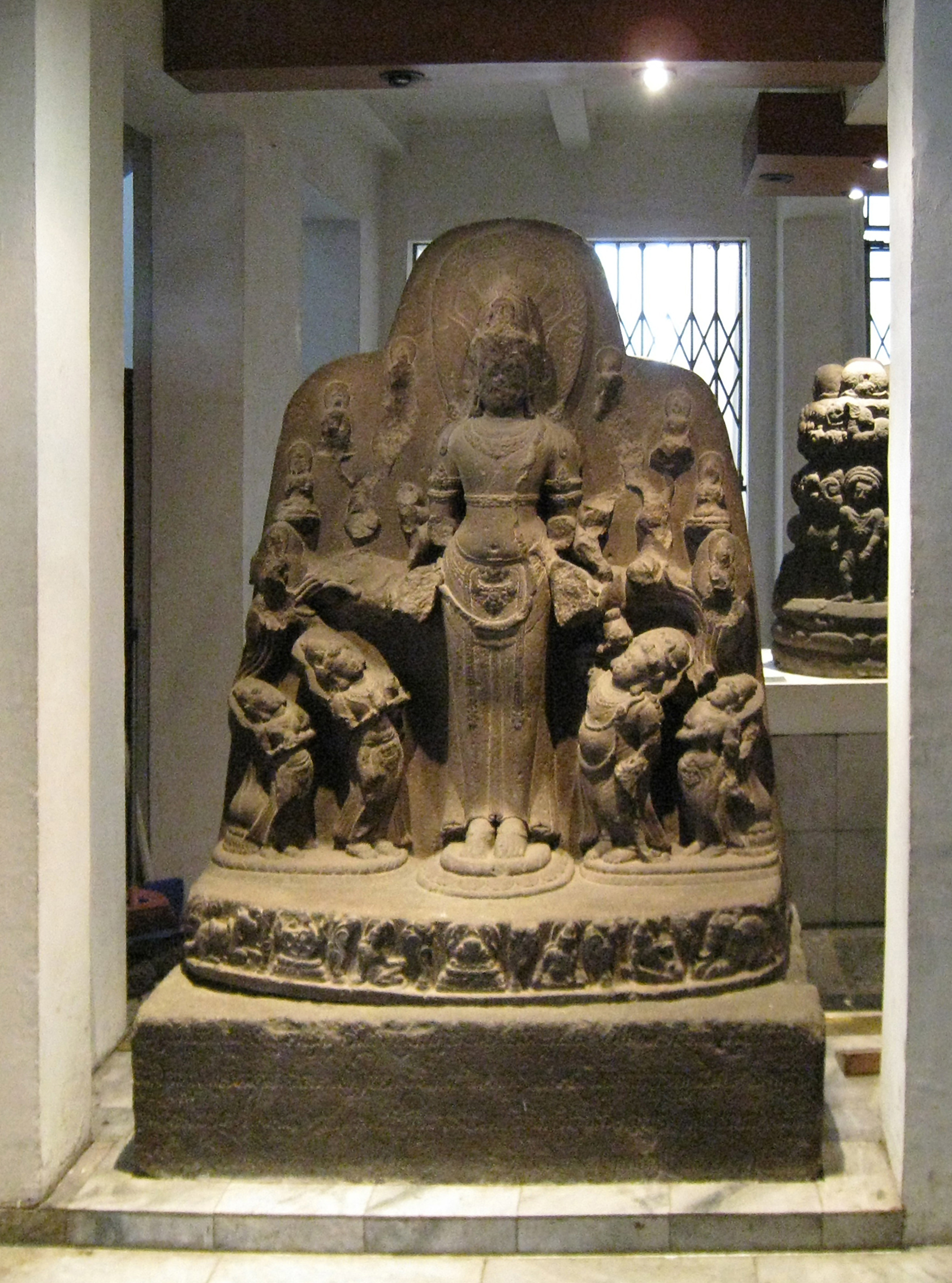
- The Paduka Amoghapasa statue. The inscription is written on the pedestal.

King of Dharmasraya
- Reign: 1286 – 1316
- Successor: Akarendrawarman
- Issue: Dara Jingga; Dara Petak
- House: Mauli

Sri Maharaja Srimat Tribhuwanaraja Mauliwarmadewa was a king of Dharmasraya in Bhumi Malayu (Sumatra), as written on the Padang Roco inscription (1286).

The inscription mentioned that the king and his people of all classes felt grateful to receive a gift of Paduka Amoghapasa statue from King Kertanagara, the king of Singhasari in Bhumi Java (Java).

The presence of the inscribed statue carried from Java by the Singhasari's nobles and high officials can be seen as an affirmation of the Dharmasraya's vassalage to the Singhasari; or at least a cordial relationship between the two kingdoms.

The historian Cœdès argued that this king was related to the previous King Srimat Trailokyaraja Maulibhusana Warmadewa of Srivijaya, whose name is written on the Grahi inscription (1183) in Chaiya, Southern Thailand.

== See also ==
- Dharmasraya
- Mauli dynasty
- Padang Roco Inscription
- Pamalayu expedition
