= Pagaruyung kingdom =

1347–1833 monarchy in modern Sumatra, Indonesia

Pagaruyung Pagaruyung Darul Qarar ڤݢرويڠ دار القرار
- 1347–1833
- Marawa Minangkabau Royal seal of Sultan Tangkal Alam

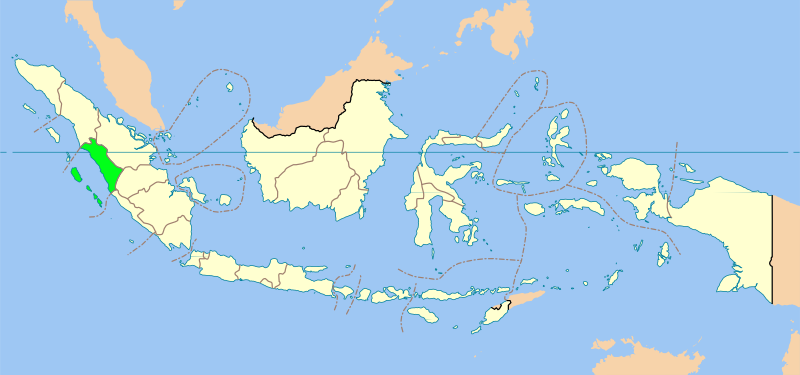
- Central Territorial of Pagaruyung now in West Sumatra Province of Indonesia (green area)
- Capital: Pagaruyung
- Common languages: Sanskrit, Minang, and Malay
- Religion: Hindu-Buddhism (first era), Animism, Sunni Islam (last era)
- Government: Monarchy
- Maharaja-Diraja (Note: According to the royal seals, the monarchs of Pagaruyung officially used the titles Maharaja-Diraja, Sultan, and Yang Dipertuan.)
  - 1347–1375 (First King): Adityawarman
  - 1789–1833 (Last King): Sultan Tangkal Alam
- History
  - Established: 1347
  - Padri War: 1833
Preceded by	Succeeded by
Dharmasraya	Sumatra's Westkust; Inderapura Kingdom
- Today part of: Indonesia

Pagaruyung (Minangkabau: Karajaan Pagaruyuang, other name: Pagaruyung Darul Qarar), also known as Pagarruyung, Pagar Ruyung and Malayapura or Malayupura, was a kingdom that once stood in the island of Sumatra and the seat of the Minangkabau kings of Western Sumatra. Modern Pagaruyung is a village in Tanjung Emas subdistrict, Tanah Datar regency, located near the town of Batusangkar, Indonesia.

Prior to its establishment, the kingdom was part of Malayapura, a kingdom that the Amoghapasa inscription mentions was ruled by Adityawarman, who established himself as the ruler of Bhumi Malayu (Suvarnabhumi). Also included in Malayapura were the kingdom of Dharmasraya and several other kingdoms or conquests of Adityawarman. The region gradually became Muslim throughout the 16th century and after. In the early 17th century, the kingdom was forced to recognise the sovereignty of the Sultanate of Aceh but rebelled in 1665, also Dutch influence and presence grew in the 17th century. In the early 19th century, turmoil erupted during the Padri War due to factional disputes and the state steadily declined.

== Etymology ==
The name Pagaruyung derives from a Minangkabauan name for the Nibung or Ruyung tree, but it can also be referred to the inscription of the mohor stamp of Sultan Tangkal Alam Bagagar of Pagaruyung, which is in Jawi script in the inner circle which reads (Jawi: سلطان توڠݢل عالم باݢݢر ابن سلطان خليفة الله يڠ ممڤوڽاءي تختا کراجأن دالم نݢري ڤݢرويڠ دار القرار جوهن برداولة ظل الله في العالم; Latin: Sulthān Tunggul Alam Bagagar ibnu Sulthān Khalīfatullāh yang mempunyai tahta kerajaan dalam negeri Pagaruyung Dārul Qarār Johan Berdaulat Zhillullāh fīl 'Ālam). Unfortunately, the mohor stamp does not indicate the year of his reign. The kingdom collapsed during the Padri War, after the signing of an agreement between the Indigenous People (Kaum adat) and the Dutch that put the Kingdom of Pagaruyung under Dutch control.

== History ==
=== Origins ===
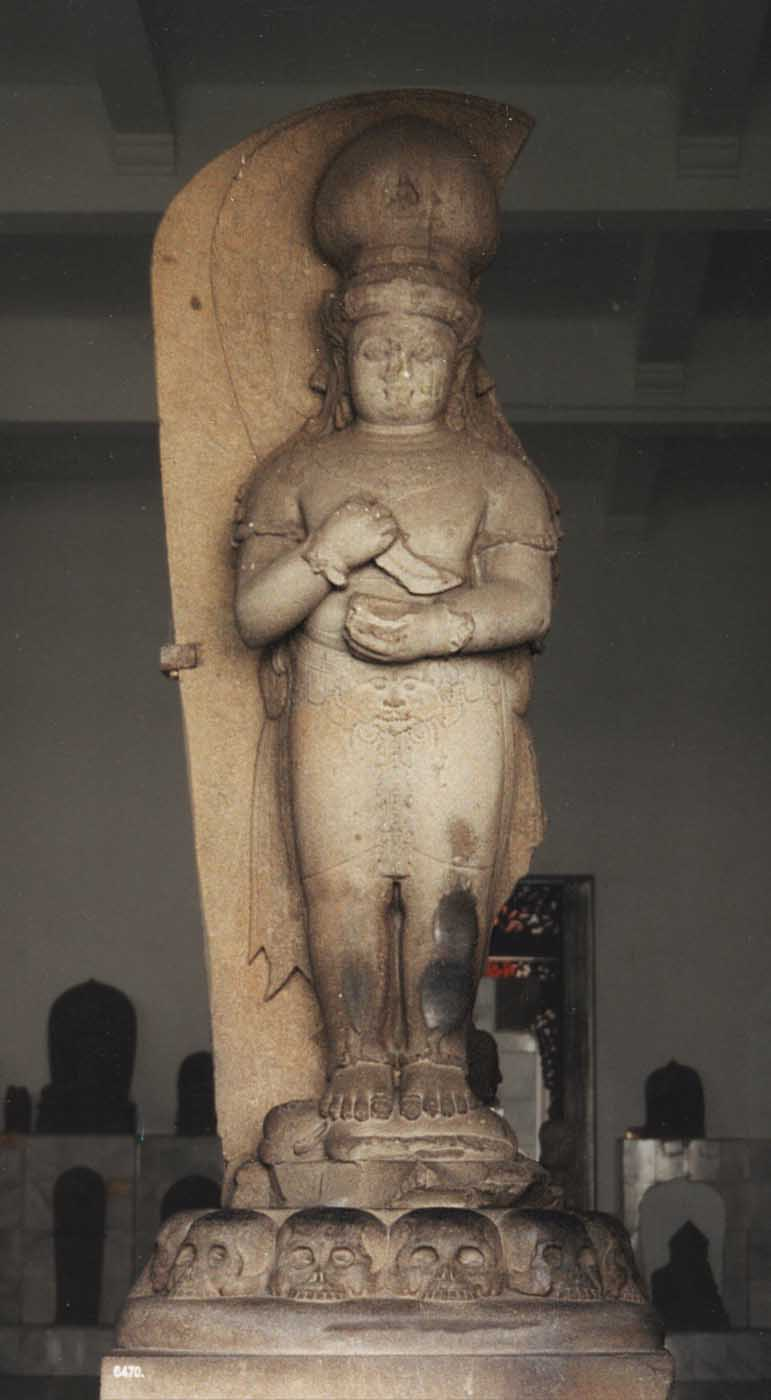
Adityawarman statue in the National Museum of Indonesia.

The emergence of Pagaruyung as a part of Malayapura cannot be known with certainty, from the Tambo received by the Minangkabau people there is no dating of any events told, even if considering Adityawarman as the founder of this kingdom, the Tambo itself also does not clearly mention it. However, some of the inscriptions left behind by Adityawarman show that he was indeed the king of the country, specifically Tuan Surawasa, as interpreted from the Batusangkar inscription. Thus, is believed that Adityawarman founded the kingdom and presided over the central Sumatra region between 1347 and 1375, most likely to control the local gold trade. The few artefacts recovered from Adityawarman's reign include a number of stones containing inscriptions, and statues. Some of these items were found at Bukit Gombak, a hill near modern Pagarruyung, and it is believed a royal palace was located there.

From the manuscript carved by Adityawarman on the back of the Amoghapasa Statue, it is mentioned that in 1347 Adityawarman proclaimed himself king in Malayapura, Adityawarman was the son of Adwayawarman as carved on the Kuburajo Inscription, and the son of Dara Jingga, the daughter of the Dharmasraya Kingdom as mentioned in Pararaton. He had previously fought with Mahapatih Gajah Mada to conquer Bali and Palembang, during his reign it is likely that Adityawarman moved the centre of his government to the interior of Minangkabau.

The Malay-accented Suruaso inscription mentions Adityawarman completing the construction of a ditch to irrigate the 'forever rice-rich garden of Nandana Sri Surawasa', which was previously built by his uncle Akarendrawarman, the previous king, so it is certain that in accordance with Minangkabau customs, inheritance from mamak (uncle) to kamanakan (nephew) had already occurred at that time, although it is likely that Minangkabau customs were only applied by the Pagaruyung Kingdom after adapting to the community environment, especially in the Luhak Nan Tigo region at the beginning of its reign. On the other side of the irrigation canal, there is also an inscription in Nagari or Tamil script, which could indicate the presence of a significant number of people from southern India in the area.

Adityawarman was initially sent to subdue important areas in Sumatra, and reigned as a vassal king (uparaja) of Majapahit. However, none of the inscriptions left by this king mentioned anything related to Bhumi Jawa and then from Berita Tiongkok it was known that Adityawarman had sent envoys to China 6 times during the period 1371 to 1377.

After Adityawarman's death, Majapahit possibly sent another expedition to conquer the kingdom in 1409. Minangkabau legends record a fierce battle with the Majapahit army in the Padang Sibusuk area. It is said that the area was so named because of the many corpses that lay there. According to the legend, the Javanese army was defeated.

Before the kingdom was established, the people in the Minangkabau region already had a political system such as a confederation, which was a deliberative body of various Nagari and Luhak. In terms of historical continuity, the Pagaruyung kingdom was a kind of administrative system change for the local people (ethnic Minang).

=== Hindu-Buddhist influence ===
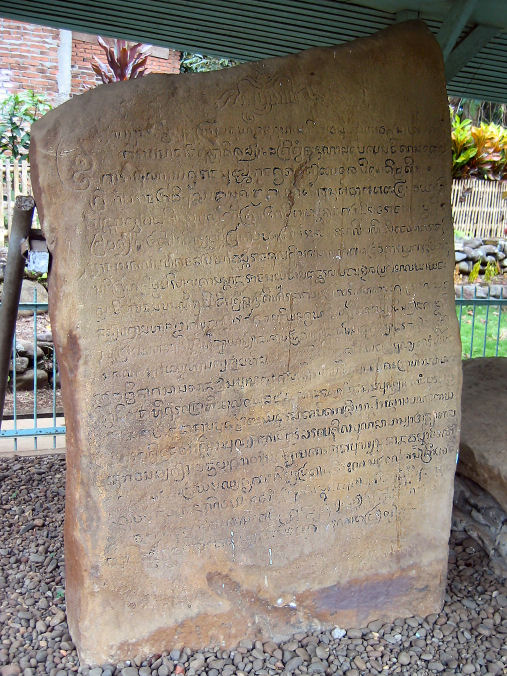
An inscribed stone from Adityawarman's kingdom

Hindu-Buddhist influence in central Sumatra had emerged around the 13th century, beginning with the dispatch of the Pamalayu Expedition by Kertanagara, and later during the reign of Adityawarman and his son Ananggawarman. The rule of Adityawarman is thought to have been strong enough to dominate the central Sumatra region and its surroundings. This can be proven by the title Maharajadiraja carried by Adityawarman as carved on the back of the Amoghapasa Statue, which was found in the upper reaches of the Batang Hari river (now included in the Dharmasraya Regency area).

The Batusangkar inscription mentions that Ananggawarman as yuvaraja performed a Tantric Buddhist ritual called hevajra, a ceremony to transfer power from Adityawarman to his crown prince, which can be related to the Chinese chronicle of 1377 about the emissary of San-fo-ts'i to the Emperor of China asking for recognition as the ruler of the San-fo-ts'i region.

Several areas in the interior of central Sumatra are still found to be influenced by Buddhism, including the Padangroco temple area, Padanglawas temple area and Muara Takus temple area. It is likely that these areas included the conquest area of Adityawarman. While recorded devout adherents of this teaching in addition to Adityawarman in the earlier period were Kubilai Khan of Mongol and king Kertanegara of Singhasari.

=== Islamic influence ===
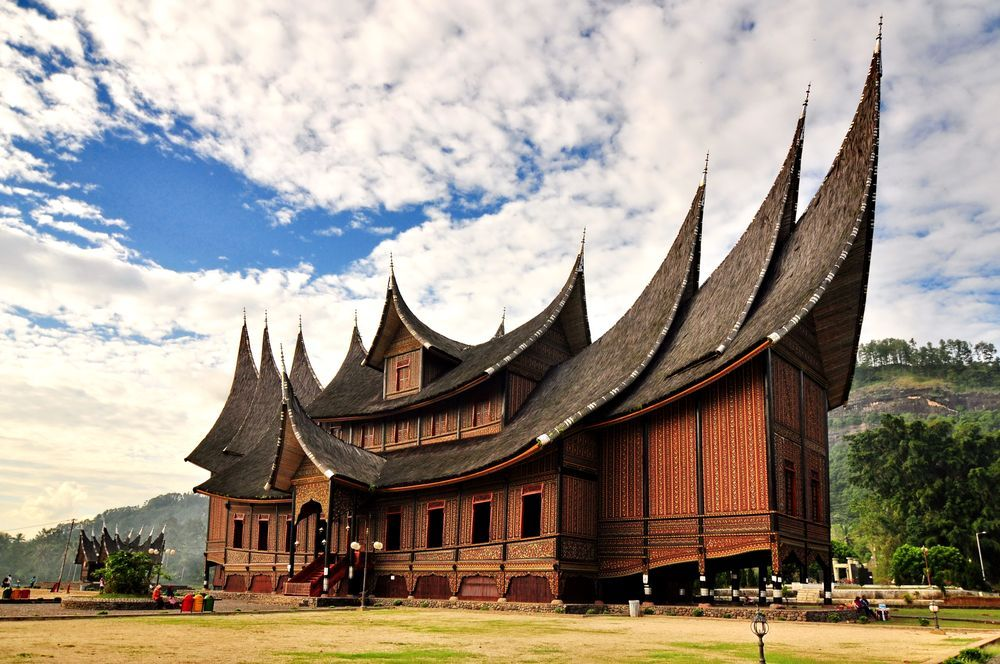
Replica of the Pagaruyung palace in West Sumatra.

The development of Islam after the end of the 14th century influenced the patriarchal system to some extent, and brought a relatively new phenomenon to the society in the interior of Minangkabau. But during this time, there was a major gap in the historical picture in the Minangkabau highlands between the last date of Adityawarman's inscription in 1375 and Tomé Pires Suma Oriental. By the 16th century, the time of the next report after the reign of Adityawarman, royal power had been split into three recognised reigning kings. They were the King of the World (Raja Alam), the King of Adat (Raja Adat), and the King of Religion (Raja Ibadat). Collectively they were called the Kings of the Three Seats (Rajo Tigo Selo). The Suma Oriental, written between 1513 and 1515, recorded that of the three Minangkabau kings, only one had become a Muslim 15 years earlier.

Islamic influence in Pagaruyung developed around the 16th century, through travellers and religious teachers who stopped over or came from Aceh and Malacca. One of the students of the famous Acehnese scholar Syaikh Abdurrauf Singkil (Tengku Syiah Kuala), Syaikh Burhanuddin Ulakan, is considered to be the first scholar to spread Islam in Pagaruyung. In the 17th century, the Kingdom of Pagaruyung was finally transformed into an Islamic sultanate. The first Islamic king is mentioned in the Minangkabau traditional tambo as Sultan Alif.

With the advent of Islam, customary rules that contradicted the teachings of Islam began to be eliminated and the essentials of custom were replaced with Islamic rules. The famous Minangkabau traditional saying: "Adaik basandi syarak, syarak basandi Kitabullah", which means that Minangkabau custom is based on Islam, while Islam is based on the Qur'an. However, in some cases, some customary systems and methods were still maintained and this is what led to the outbreak of the civil war known as the Padri War, which was initially between the Padri (ulama) and the Adat, before the Dutch became involved in this war.

Islam also influenced the government system of the Pagaruyung Kingdom with the addition of governmental elements such as Tuan Kadi and several other terms related to Islam. The naming of the village of Sumpur Kudus, which contains the word kudus derived from the word Quddūs (holy) as the seat of Rajo Ibadat, and Limo Kaum, which contains the word qaum, are clearly influenced by Arabic or Islam. In addition, the terms Imam, Katik (Khatib), Bila (Bilal), Malin (Mu'alim) also appear in the Adat (customary law), which are replacements for the Hindu and Buddhist terms used previously, such as the term Pandito (priest).

=== Relations with the Dutch and the British ===
"..., there is a striking consistency in the style of writing, not only of books in prose and verse, but also of epistolary correspondence, and my own experience has proved to me that no greater difficulty attends the translation of letters from the princes of the Molucca islands, than from those of Kedah or Trangganu in the peninsula, or of Menangkabau in Sumatra."

— Excerpt from William Marsden.

In the early 17th century, the kingdom was forced to recognise the sovereignty of the Sultanate of Aceh, and acknowledge the Aceh governors appointed for the west coast of Sumatra. But around 1665, the Minang people on the west coast rose up and rebelled against the Aceh governors. During this time, the first arrival of the Vereenigde Oostindische Compagnie (VOC) in 1663, which then established a trading office in the city of Padang, had set interest among local rulers. A letter from the Minangkabau ruler calling himself the Raja of Pagaruyung made a request to the VOC, and the VOC took the opportunity at that time to stop Aceh's monopoly on gold and pepper. Subsequently, the VOC, through its regent in Padang, Jacob Pits, whose jurisdiction extended from Kotawan in the south to Barus in the north of Padang, sent a letter on 9 October 1668 to Sultan Ahmadsyah, Iskandar Zur-Karnain, the gold-rich ruler of Minangkabau, informing him that the VOC had taken control of the west coast so that the gold trade could be re-established on the coast. According to Dutch records, Sultan Ahmadsyah died in 1674 and was succeeded by his son, Sultan Indermasyah.

When the VOC succeeded in expelling the Sultanate of Aceh from the coast of West Sumatra in 1666, Aceh's influence on Pagaruyung weakened. The relationship between the overseas and coastal regions and the centre of Pagaruyung Kingdom became close again. At that time Pagaruyung was one of the centres of trade on the island of Sumatra, due to the production of gold there. This attracted the attention of the Dutch and the British to establish relations with Pagaruyung. It is recorded that in 1684, the first European to enter the region, a Portuguese explorer named Thomas Dias, paid a visit to Pagaruyung on the orders of the Dutch governor-general in Malacca. He travelled from the east coast to reach the region in 1684 and reported, probably from hearsay, that there was a palace at Pagaruyung and that visitors had to go through three gates to enter it. The primary local occupations at the time were gold panning and agriculture, he reported.

Around 1750, the Pagaruyung kingdom began to dislike the VOC presence in Padang and tried to persuade the British in the Bencoolen (now modern-day Bengkulu) to join forces to expel the Dutch, although the British did not respond. However, during the Fourth Anglo-Dutch War in 1781, the British managed to temporarily control Padang without a fight and netted the British 500,000 florins in goods and money. At that time a delegation from Pagaruyung came to congratulate the British on their success in expelling the Dutch from Padang. In 1784, The fortress at Padang was destroyed before the town was returned to VOC control. According to Marsden, Minangkabau had long been considered the richest in gold, and at that time the power of the Minangkabau king was said to have been divided between the king of Suruaso and the king of Sungai Tarab with equal power. Earlier in 1732, the VOC regent in Padang had recorded that a queen named Yang Dipertuan Puti Jamilan had sent spears and swords made of gold, as a sign of establishing herself as the ruler of the bumi emas (golden earth). Even after the Dutch and British reached the interior of Minangkabau, they never found significant gold reserves in the area.

As a result of the conflict between Britain and France in the Napoleonic Wars, in which the Dutch were on the French side, the British fought the Dutch and regained control of the west coast of West Sumatra between 1795 and 1819. In 1818, Thomas Stamford Raffles visited Pagaruyung by reaching it from the west coast, which was already riven by warfare between the Padri and the Adat. Raffles found that the royal capital had been burnt down as a result of the war, and by then it had been burned to the ground three times. It was rebuilt after the first two fires, but abandoned after the third, and Raffles found little more than waringin trees. After a peace between the British and the Dutch in 1814, the Dutch re-entered Padang in May 1819. The Dutch reasserted their influence on the island of Sumatra and Pagaruyung, with the signing of the Treaty of London in 1824 with the British.

=== Decline ===
"From the ruins of this city (Pagaruyung) it is evident that here once stood a great Malay civilisation, rivalling that of Java, the site of many buildings now no longer exists, destroyed by the ongoing war."

— Opinion from Thomas Stamford Raffles.

The power of the king of Pagaruyung was already very weak by the time of the Padri War, although he was still respected. Areas on the west coast fell under the influence of Aceh, while Inderapura on the south coast became practically an independent kingdom although still officially subject to the king of Pagaruyung. The east coast was already under the influence of the Malay Sultanates, and in the future, other areas, such as Kampar Kiri, Singingi and Kuantan, became independent during the Padri's seizure of most of the Kingdom of Pagaruyung.

In the early 19th century, conflict broke out between the Padri and the Adat. In several negotiations there was no agreement between them. There was turmoil in several areas of the Pagaruyung Kingdom, culminating in the Padri fundamentalist Islamic group, under the leadership of Tuanku Pasaman, in conflict with the traditional syncretic groups, elite families and Pagarruyung royals. Sultan Arifin Muningsyah was forced to step aside and flee from the royal capital to Lubuk Jambi.

The original Pagaruyung Palace on Batu Patah Hill was burned down during a riot in Padri War back in 1804. During the conflict most of the Minangkabau royal family were killed in 1815, on the orders of Tuanku Lintau. Pressured by the Padri, the Pagaruyung royal family turned to the Dutch for help, and had previously conducted diplomacy with the British when Raffles visited Pagaruyung and promised them assistance. On 10 February 1821, Sultan Tunggul Alam Bagagarsyah, a nephew of Sultan Arifin Muningsyah who was in Padang, along with 19 other traditional leaders signed an agreement with the Dutch to cooperate against the Padri. Although Sultan Tunggul Alam Bagagar at the time was not considered entitled to make a treaty on behalf of the kingdom of Pagaruyung. As a result of this agreement, the Dutch made it a sign of the submission of the kingdom of Pagaruyung to the Dutch government. Dutch forces made their first attack on a Padri village in April 1821. Later after the Dutch succeeded in capturing Pagaruyung from the Padri, in 1824 at the request of Lieutenant Colonel Antoine Theodore Raaff, Yang Dipertuan Pagaruyung Raja Alam Muningsyah returned to Pagaruyung, but in 1825, Sultan Arifin Muningsyah, the last king in Minangkabau, died and was later buried in Pagaruyung.

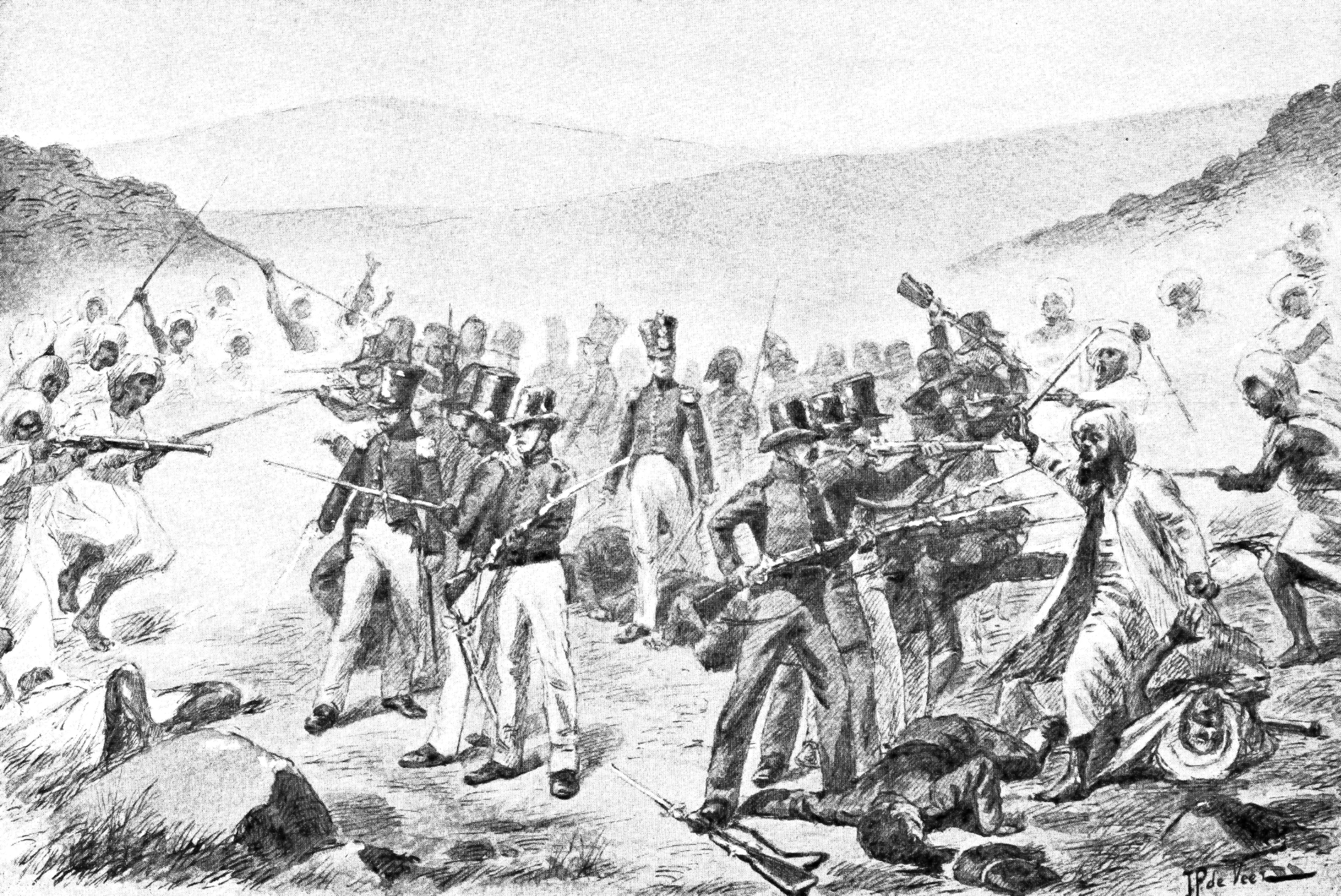
Dutch and Padri forces facing each other on the battlefield. Painting circa 1900.

Sultan Tunggul Alam Bagagarsyah, on the other hand, wanted to be recognised as the Raja of Pagaruyung, but the Dutch East Indies government had limited his authority from the start and only appointed him as the Regent of Tanah Datar. Perhaps this policy gave Sultan Tunggul Alam Bagagar the impetus to start thinking about how to drive the Dutch out of his country.

After ending the Diponegoro War in Java, the Dutch then tried to subdue the Padri with troops from Java, Madura, South Sulawesi and Ambon. Though, Dutch colonial ambitions seemed to make the adat and the Padri factions try to forget their differences and ally in secret to expel the Dutch. On 2 May 1833 Sultan Tunggul Alam Bagagar was arrested by Lieutenant Colonel Cornelis Pieter Jacob Elout in Batusangkar on charges of treason. He was banished to Batavia (present-day Jakarta) for the rest of his life, and buried in the Mangga Dua cemetery.

After its fall, the influence and prestige of the Pagaruyung Kingdom remained high, especially among the overseas Minangkabau community. When the members of the court were scattered following a failed rebellion against the Dutch in 1833, one of the heirs of the Pagaruyung Kingdom was invited to become the ruler of Kuantan. Likewise, when Raffles was still in charge of the Malay Peninsula, he met with Pagaruyung relatives in Negeri Sembilan, and Raffles intended to appoint the Yang Dipertuan Ali Alamsyah, who he considered a direct descendant of the Minangkabau king, as king under British protection. Meanwhile, after the end of the Padri War, Tuan Gadang in Batipuh asked the Dutch East Indies government to give him a higher position than the Regent of Tanah Datar that he held after replacing Sultan Tunggul Alam Bagagar, but this request was rejected by the Dutch, this resulted in one of the drivers of the 1841 rebellion in Batipuh, besides issues relating to cultuurstelsel.

== Territory ==
According to Tomé Pires in the Suma Oriental, The land of Minangkabau, in addition to the inland highlands of Sumatra where the king lived, also included the eastern coastal region of Arcat (between Aru and Rokan) to Jambi and the west coast port cities of Panchur Barus, Tiku, and Pariaman. The records also state that the lands of Indragiri, Siak and Arcat were part of Minangkabau, with Teluk Kuantan as the main port of the Minangkabau king. However, later the overseas areas such as Siak (Gasib), Kampar Pekan Tua and Indragiri were then separated and conquered by the Malacca Sultanate and the Aceh Sultanate.

The political sphere of influence of the Kingdom of Pagaruyung was an area where Minangkabau culture lived, grew and developed. This area can be traced from this statement in the Minang-language Tambo (traditional legend):

Dari Sikilang Aia Bangih
Hinggo Taratak Aia Hitam
Dari Durian Ditakuak Rajo
Hinggo Aia Babaliak Mudiak

Sikilang Aia Bangih was the northern boundary, now in West Pasaman, bordering Natal, North Sumatra. Taratak Aia Hitam is an area of Bengkulu. Durian Ditakuak Rajo is an area in Bungo Regency, Jambi. Finally, Aia Babaliak Mudiak is an area in the lower reaches of the Kampar River, Pelalawan Regency, Riau today. In full, the tambo states that the Alam Minangkabau (area of the Kingdom of Pagaruyung) is as follows:

Nan salilik Gunuang Marapi
Saedaran Gunuang Pasaman
Sajajaran Sago jo Singgalang
Saputaran Talang jo Kurinci
Dari Sirangkak nan Badangkang
Hinggo Buayo Putiah Daguak
Sampai ka Pintu Rajo Hilia
Hinggo Durian Ditakuak Rajo
Sipisau-pisau Hanyuik
Sialang Balantak Basi
Hinggo Aia Babaliak Mudiak
Sailiran Batang Bangkaweh
Sampai ka ombak nan badabua
Sailiran Batang Sikilang
Hinggo lauik nan sadidieh
Ka timua Ranah Aia Bangih
Rao jo Mapek Tunggua
Gunuang Mahalintang
Pasisia Banda Sapuluah
Taratak Aia Hitam
Sampai ka Tanjuang Simalidu
Pucuak Jambi Sambilan Lurah

Luhak Nan Tigo region
Area around Mount Pasaman
Area around Mount Sago and Mount Singgalang
Area around Mount Talang and Mount Kerinci
Area of Pariangan Padang Panjang and its surroundings
Pesisir Selatan Regency and Mukomuko Regency
Western Jambi Area
Areas bordering Jambi
Area around Indragiri Hulu
Area around Mount Sailan and Singingi
Rantau Hilir Kampar area (Pelalawan Regency)
Area around Lake Singkarak and Ombilin River
Area up to the Indonesian Ocean
Edges of Batang Sikilang Area, West Pasaman
Areas bordering the Indonesian Ocean
Area east of Beremas river, West Pasaman
Areas in the region of Rao dan Mapat Tunggul, Pasaman
Areas bordering South Tapanuli
Areas along the west coast of almost the entire region of Pesisir Selatan
Area around Silauik and Lunang
Area up to Tanjung Simalidu
Area around the hills of Batang Hari

== Relations with regional powers ==
The influence of the kingdom of Pagaruyung covered almost the entire island of Sumatra as written by William Marsden in his book The history of Sumatra (1784). Several other kingdoms outside Sumatra also recognized Pagaruyung's sovereignty, although not in a tribute-giving relationship. There are as many as 62 to 75 small kingdoms in the archipelago which are the main ones in Pagaruyung, which are spread in the Philippines, Brunei, Thailand and Malaysia, as well as in Sumatra, East Nusa Tenggara and West Nusa Tenggara in Indonesia. The relationship is distinguished based on gradasi (gradations) of the relationship, namely sapiah balahan (female bloodline), kaduang karatan (male bloodline), Kapak radai, and timbang pacahan who are royal descendants.

== See also ==
- History of Indonesia
- Inderapura Kingdom
- Negeri Sembilan
- Srivijaya
- Minangkabau people

== Sources ==
- Ambler, John S. (1988). "Historical Perspectives on Sawah Cultivation and the Political and Economic Context for Irrigation in West Sumatra" (PDF). Indonesia. 46 (46): 39–77. doi:10.2307/3351044. hdl:1813/53896. JSTOR 3351044.
- Bosch, Frederik David Kan (1931). De rijkssieraden van Pagar Roejoeng (in Dutch). Batavia: Oudheidkundig Verslag (Archaeological Report). pp. 49–108. OCLC 219960806.
- de Casparis, J. G. (1975). Indonesian palaeography: a history of writing in Indonesia from the beginnings to c. AD 1500. Brill. ISBN 978-9004041721.
- Coedès, George (1968). Vella, Walter F. (ed.). The Indianized States of Southeast Asia. trans. Susan Brown Cowing. University of Hawaii Press. p. 232. ISBN 978-0824803681.
- Colombijn, Freek (2005). "A Moving History of Middle Sumatra, 1600–1870" (PDF). Modern Asian Studies. 39 (1): 1–38. doi:10.1017/S0026749X04001374. S2CID 146399326.
- Pires, Tomé (1990) [1513]. Cortesão, Armando (ed.). The Suma Oriental of Tomé Pires. Laurie. ISBN 978-8120605350.
- Dobbin, Christine (1977). "Economic change in Minangkabau as a factor in the rise of the Padri movement, 1784–1830". Indonesia. 23 (1): 1–38. doi:10.2307/3350883. hdl:1813/53633. JSTOR 3350883.
- Drakard, Jane (1999). A Kingdom of Words: Language and Power in Sumatra. OUP. ISBN 978-983-56-0035-7.
- Gallop, Annabel Teh (2002). Malay seal inscriptions: a study in Islamic epigraphy from Southeast Asia. Vol. II. School of Oriental and African Studies, University of London. p. 137. British Library, ILS catalogue number: 12454119.
- Jakarta Post (1 March 2007). "West Sumatra palace destroyed by fire". Syofiardi Bachyul. Padang: The Jakarta Post. Archived from the original on 29 September 2007.
- Jakarta Post (23 November 2013). "Istano Basa Pagaruyung: Restored to glory". Syofiardi Bachyul. The Jakarta Post. Archived from the original on 23 November 2013.
- Kompas (28 February 2007). "Perbaikan Istana Pagaruyung Lebih dari Rp 20 Miliar" (in Indonesian). Mahdi Muhammad. Tanah Datar: Kompas. Archived from the original on 7 March 2007.
- Miksic, John (2004). "From megaliths to tombstones: the transition from pre-history to early Islamic period in highland West Sumatra". Indonesia and the Malay World. 32 (93): 191–210. doi:10.1080/1363981042000320134. S2CID 214651183.
- Tempo (28 February 2007). "Kebakaran Istano Basa Isyarat Kepada Pemerintah" (in Indonesian). Padang: Tempo Interaktif. Archived from the original on 30 September 2007.
