= Pamalayu =

Military campaign

Pamalayu campaign
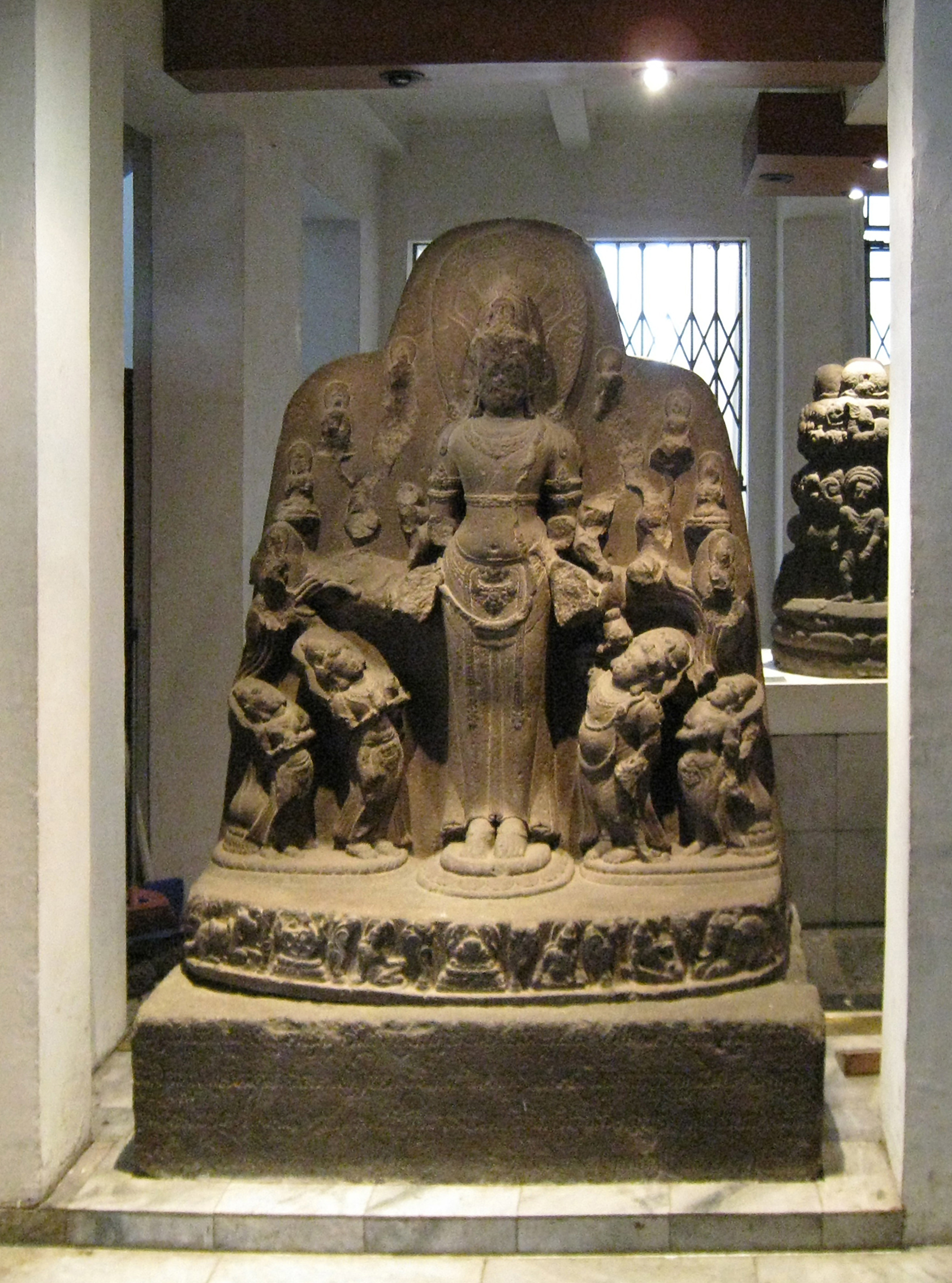
- The statue of Amoghapasa on top of the inscription, sent from Bhumijava (Java) to Suvarnabhumi (Sumatra).
Date	1275–1292 (First phase)
Location	Dharmasraya, Sumatra, Malay Peninsula
Result	Javanese victory

Belligerents
Singhasari (First phase); Majapahit (Second phase)	Melayu Kingdom

Commanders and leaders
Kertanegara; Kebo Anabrang	Tribhuwanaraja

The Pamalayu campaign was a diplomatic and military expeditionary force sent by the Javanese King Kertanegara of Singhasari to conquer the Sumatran Melayu Kingdom. It was decreed in 1275, though perhaps not undertaken until later.

Little is known about the results of the expedition. The Padang Roco Inscription dated from 1286 states that a religious statue of Amoghapasa was established at Dharmasraya on the orders of Kertanagara, and that all the inhabitants of Melayu and especially their king, Tribhuwanaraja rejoiced at the presentation of the gifts.

== History ==
The expedition arguably established Javanese domination over Melayu and trade in the Strait of Malacca. To cement the relationship between the two kingdoms, a political marriage was arranged. According to the Pararaton, two Malay princesses, Dara Petak and Dara Jingga, went to Java, originally intended for Kertanegara. However following his demise by Jayakatwang, princess Dara Petak would later be married to Kertanegara's successor, Raden Wijaya of Majapahit. The union would result in the second king of Majapahit, Jayanegara.

According to Kidung Panji Wijayakrama the leader of the expedition was Mahisa Anabrang (lit. buffalo that crossed), while Batak sources named a figure called Indrawarman, and the Landak kingdom sources named Ratu Sang Nata Pulang Pali. The expedition ended when Kertanegara was killed in 1292, and the forces of Mahisa Anabrang decided to return to Java to bring the two Malay princesses. Mongol forces left Java on 23 April 1293, while the expedition returned to Java on 3 May 1293. In turn, Dara Jingga would marry Adwayawarman or Adwayabrahma, a Javanese high official and gave birth to Adityawarman.

Meanwhile, Indrawarman stayed behind and did not recognize Raden Wijaya as successor to Kertanegara. He controlled pepper producing regions of Dareh river in Dharmasraya, as well as port on Batang Hari river (modern day Jambi), and tried to secure North Sumatra region by having his base near Asahan river. Aru sultanate was founded in 1299 by Sultan Malikul Mansur and managed to take Kutu Kampar region in 1301 from Indrawarman. He and his forces then left Asahan and entered into Simalungun. At the time, between Silo and Bah Bolon river, was the region of the Siregar clan that came from Lottung/East Samosir which was under pressure from Sinaga clan. Siregar clan then asked for help with Indrawarman and his Javanese forces. With the help of Siregar clan, Indrawarman then founded Silo kingdom with the port on Bah Bolon called Indrapura. Indrawarman Javanese forces adopted local Batak Simalungun clan surnames like Saragih-Silo, and Siregar as well as founding new ones like Damanik, Purba, and Girsang. In 1339, Majapahit forces came under the leadership of Adityawarman and destroyed Silo kingdom and Indrapura. Indrawarman was killed but his descendants fled to Haranggaol and founded Dolok Silo Kingdom and Raya Kahean Kingdom. The formerly Silo region was taken over by Sinaga clan and founded Tanah Jawa (lit. Javanese Land) kingdom.

Sang Nata Pulang Pali, one of the noble leader of the expedition, diverted his forces to Tanjungpura instead of coming home to Java. In one version, from Ketapang they followed the Kapuas river before turning to Landak Kecil river and stopped at Kuala Mandor. In another version, they temporarily stayed at Padang Tikar before following Tenganap river and landed on Sekilap (modern day Sepatah). This place would eventually be known as Ningrat Batur or Anggrat Bator. He gained the trust and followers among local people by distributing salt, and with their help, he founded Landak kingdom, and crowned himself Ratu Sang Nata Pulang Pali I.
