= Sultan Tangkal Alam Bagagar =

King of the Pagaruyung Kingdom

Daulat Yang Dipertuan Sultan Alam Bagagarsyah (1789 – 12 February 1849, in Batavia) was the last king of the Pagaruyung Kingdom. He was the grandson of Sultan Alam Muningsyah. He had four brothers and sisters: Puti Reno Sori, Tuan Gadih Tembong, Tuan Bujang Nan Bakundi and Yang Dipertuan Batuhampar. Sultan Alam Bagagarsyah was appointed as regent of Tanah Datar after the Netherlands seized Pagaruyung from the Padri. Because of an alleged conspiracy against the Dutch, Bagagarsyah Sultan Alam was arrested and exiled to Batavia, where he died in 1849.

1803 was the beginning of the Padri War, a bloody dispute with the Padri in Koto Tangah, when Sultan Alam Bagagarsyah was still 15 years old. He managed to escape to Padang, which at that time was controlled by United Kingdom. In Padang he lived as a commoner.

On 10 February 1821, along with 19 other adat leaders Sultan Alam Bagagarsyah signed an agreement to give Pagaruyung, Suruaso, Sungai Tarab and surrounding villages to the Dutch East Indies. They also promised to obey and comply with the Dutch East Indies government. In return the Netherlands would provide troops to aid in expelling the Padri.

After most of the Tanah Datar were ruled by Dutch East Indies, Sultan Alam Bagagarsyah was restored as king of Pagaruyung, replacing the Sultan Muningsyah who died in 1825. At the same time he served as the regent of Tanah Datar.

On 11 January 1833, the Minangkabau rebelled against the Netherlands. Dutch parties, especially Lieutenant Colonel Elout, accused the Sultan Alam Bagagarsyah of being involved in the resistance. Therefore, on 2 May 1833 he was arrested and on 24 May he was exiled to Batavia in handcuffs. The Sultan was later released but not allowed to return to the Minangkabau.

He eventually died on 12 February 1849, and was buried in the cemetery at Mangga Dua. In 1975, with permission from the Indonesian government, his tomb was moved to the Cemetery of Heroes.

Sultan Alam Bagagarsyah had four wives: Siti Badi'ah, Puti Lenggogeni, Tuan Gadih Saruaso and Tuan Gadih Gapuak.

== Family ==
His father was Yang Dipertuan Sultan Alam Muningsyah (II) or Sultan Abdul Fatah Sultan Abdul Jalil (I) or Yang Dipertuan Patah and his mother was Puti Reno Janji Tuan Gadih Pagaruyung XI.

=== Brothers and sisters ===
1. Puti Reno Sori
2. Tuan Gadih Tembong
3. Tuan Bujang Nan Bakundi dan
4. Yang Dipertuan Batuhampar

=== Wives ===
1. Siti Badi’ah from Padang
2. Puti Lenggogeni (niece of Tuan Panitahan Sungai Tarab)
3. Tuan Gadih Saruaso (niece of Indomo Saruaso, salah seorang Basa Ampek Balai Kerajaan Pagaruyung)
4. Tuan Gadih Gapuak (niece of Tuan Makhudum Sumanik)

=== Children ===
1. Sutan Mangun Tuah
2. Puti Siti Hella Perhimpunan (Puti Alam Perhimpunan)
3. Sutan Oyong (Sutan Bagalib Alam)
4. Puti Sari Gumilan
5. Sutan Mangun (then become Tuan Panitahan Sungai Tarab as one from Basa Ampek Balai from Pagaruyung Kingdom)
6. Sutan Simawang Saruaso (then become Indomo Saruaso)
7. Sutan Abdul Hadis (then become Tuan Makhudum Sumanik as one of Basa Ampek Balai from Pagaruyung)
8. Puti Mariam

=== Daughter-in-law ===
- Puti Reno Sumpu Tuan Gadih Pagaruyung ke XIII (daughter of Puti Reno Sori Tuan Gadih Pagaruyung XII and niece of Sultan Alam Bagagarsyah).

== See also ==
- Pagaruyung Kingdom
- Minangkabau

== Footnotes ==
Preceded by Alam Muningsyah	Sultan of Pagaruyung; 1821–1833 CE	Succeeded by –
