= Saruaso II inscription =

Inscription in Indonesia

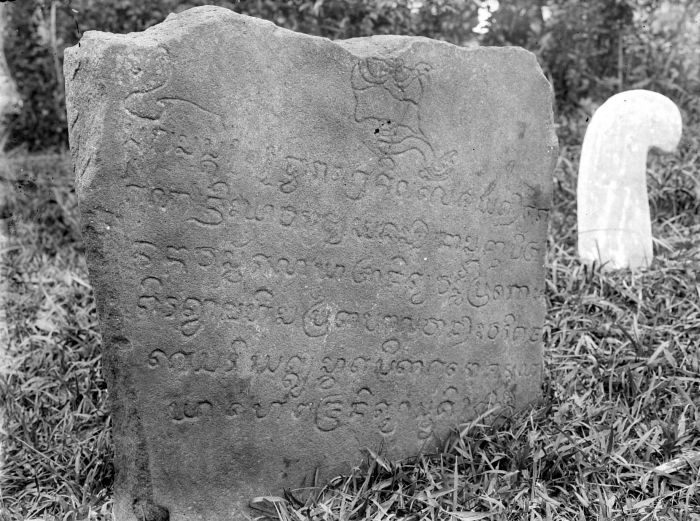
Saruaso II inscription, photo taken between 1910 and 1930.

Saruaso II inscription, also previously known as Batusangkar inscription, is one of the inscriptions from the King Adityawarman era (14th century CE). It is currently located at the Fort van der Capellen area, in the courtyard of the old office of the Monuments Preservation Department (BPCB, the old Balai Adat hall), in Batusangkar city, West Sumatra, Indonesia. The inscription was previously displayed across in front of the Indo Jalito Building, which was the residence of the Regent of Tanah Datar during the Dutch colonial period (researcher L.C. Westenenk once lived there). The inscription is written in Old Javanese script and Sanskrit language.

The inscription is carved into a brown quartz sandstone and slightly yellowish color on both sides. The inscription shape is rectangular, measuring 110 cm high, 75 cm wide, and 17 cm thick. There is writing on both sides (side A and side B), which are basically the same content but in slightly different sentence structures. Some of the scripts have worn out but can be estimated by comparing the two sides. A special feature of this inscription is its unique ornaments; on the front side there are a snake ornament and ornament of a giant (kala) head with large fangs and wearing a small crown, while on the back side there is also an ornament of a giant head but in a shape like an inverted urn, has large protruding eyes and short fangs.

The inscription begins with a salvation prayer as is customary in ancient inscriptions. The next line is a chronogram (candrasangkala), but it has not yet been deciphered. The following lines contain praises to the crown prince (yuwaraja) Ananggawarman, son of Adityawarman, as a person who is devoted to his father, mother, and teacher. Ananggawarman is also mentioned in connection with the phrase Hewajra nityasmrti, which indicates that his religious sect is the same as his father's, namely the Tantric Buddhism. This reveals that some rulers in Sumatra followed esoteric Buddhism at least until the 14th century CE.

== Text ==
The writing of this inscription according to de Casparis, as follows:

(1) Subham astu

dvārāgre śilalekha yat kṛta(2)guṇā Śrīyauvarājya=padam

nāmnaś=cāpi A(3)naṅgavamrma taṇaya Ādityavarmmaprabho

tiratvāmahimapratāpabalavān vairigaja(5)kesari

sattyam=mātapītagurau karuṇayā Hevajra-nityāsmṛtiḥ

== Translation ==
Tentative translation of the inscription according to de Casparis, as follows:

Anaṅgavarma, son of the lord king Ādityavarman, pays homage to the inscription in stone (placed) before the entryway of the place (palace) of the Eminent Crown Prince who is accomplished in all virtues, has crossed to the other shore of greatness in courage and strength, who is a "lion-elephant", and through his truth and compassion towards his preceptors, his mother and father, ever practices the vow of the Hevajra(-tantra).

== See also ==
- Adityawarman
- Ananggawarman
- Pagaruyung Kingdom
