= Suvarnabhumi =

Name of a land, bordering the Indian Ocean, mentioned in many ancient sources

Suvarṇabhūmi (Sanskrit: सुवर्णभूमि, IPA: [suʋɐrɳɐbʰuːmi]; Pali: Suvaṇṇabhūmi, IPA: [suʋɐɳːɐbʰuːmi]; lit. 'golden land') (Note: Spelled in various local languages as: Malay: Suwarna Bumi; Burmese: သုဝဏ္ဏဘူမိ [θṵwʊ̀ɰ̃na̰bùmḭ]; Khmer: សុវណ្ណភូមិ [soʔ.ʋan.naʔ.pʰuːm]; and Thai: สุวรรณภูมิ, RTGS: Suwannaphum.) is a toponym that appears in many ancient Indian literary sources and Buddhist texts such as the Mahavamsa, some of the Jataka tales, the Milinda Panha and the Ramayana.

Though its exact location is unknown and remains a matter of debate, Suvarṇabhūmi was an important port along trade routes that run through the Indian Ocean, setting sail from the wealthy ports in Basra, Ubullah, and Siraf, through Muscat, Malabar, Ceylon, the Nicobars, Kedah and on through the Strait of Malacca to fabled Suvarṇabhūmi.

Ian Glover, Emeritus Reader in Southeast Asian Archaeology at the University of London, has said: “It is widely accepted in the 21st century that Suvarnabhumi as reported in early Indian literature was not a specific location which can be marked on a map. Rather, it was an idealised place, perhaps equivalent to Atlantis in Western history, a distant somewhere to the east of India where traders, sailors, and Buddhist and Hindu teachers went to make their fortunes and spread their teachings and bring back gold and other exotic products desired by a rising elite and the wealthy classes at home.”

== Historiography ==
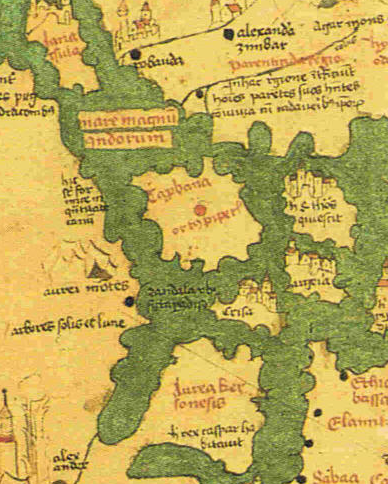
Crisa and Aureia, the Isles of Gold, near the Aurea Chersonese, the Golden Peninsula, near Java in the Indian Ocean, on the map of Andreas Walsperger, around 1448

Suvarṇabhūmi means 'golden land' or 'land of gold' and the ancient sources have associated it with one of a variety of places throughout the Southeast Asian region.

It might also be the source of the Western concept of Aurea Regio in Claudius Ptolemy's Trans-Gangetic India or India beyond the Ganges, and the Golden Chersonese of the Greek and Roman geographers and sailors. The Periplus of the Erythraean Sea refers to the Land of Gold, Chryse, and describes it as “an island in the ocean, the furthest extremity towards the east of the inhabited world, lying under the rising sun itself, called Chryse... Beyond this country... there lies a very great inland city called Thina”. Dionysius Periegetes mentioned: “The island of Chryse (Gold), situated at the very rising of the Sun”.

Or, as Priscian put it in his popular rendition of Periegetes: "if your ship… takes you to where the rising sun returns its warm light, then will be seen the Isle of Gold with its fertile soil." Avienius referred to the Insula Aurea (Golden Isle) located where “the Scythian seas give rise to the Dawn”. Josephus speaks of the "Aurea Chersonesus", which he equates with the Biblical Ophir, whence the ships of Tyre and Israel brought back the gold for the Temple of Jerusalem. The city of Thina was described by Ptolemy’s Geography as the capital city of the country on the eastern shores of the Magnus Sinus (Gulf of Thailand).

== Location ==
The location of Suvarṇabhūmi has been the subject of much debate, both in scholarly and nationalistic agendas. It remains one of the most mystified and contentious toponyms in Asia. Scholars have identified two regions as possible locations for the ancient Suvarṇabhūmi: Insular Southeast Asia and Southern India. In a study of the various literary sources for the location of Suvarṇabhūmi, Saw Mra Aung concluded that it was impossible to draw a decisive conclusion on this and that only thorough scientific research would reveal which of several versions of Suvarṇabhūmi was the original.

Some have speculated that this country refers to the Kingdom of Funan. The main port of Funan was Cattigara Sinarum statio (Kattigara the port of the Sinae).

Due to many factors, including the lack of historical evidence, and the absence of scholarly consensus, various cultures in Southeast Asia identify Suvarṇabhūmi as an ancient kingdom there, and claim ethnic and political descendancy as its successor state. As no such claim or legend existed before the translation and publication of the Edicts, scholars see these claims as based on nationalism or attempts to claim the title of the first Buddhists in Southeast Asia.

Chingduang Yurayong and colleagues read the sources as describing more than one such land. In their reading the Sanskrit texts use Suvarṇadvīpa for the mainland and the islands together and Suvarṇabhūmi for the mainland alone. Chinese usage separates the two in the same way, with Jīndì or Jīndìguó for a mainland Golden Land and Yijing’s Jīnzhōu, Golden Island, for Śrī Vijaya on Sumatra. Following Étienne Lamotte, they take the notices together as describing a broad region of several Golden Lands rather than a single polity.

=== Mainland Southeast Asia ===
==== Cambodia ====
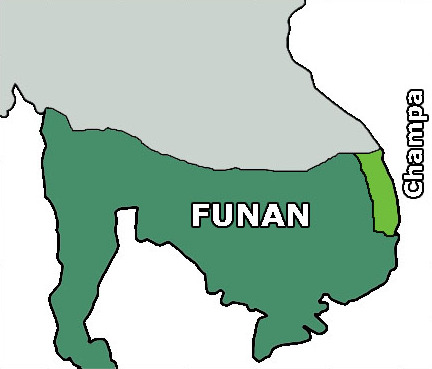
The territorial extent of the Kingdom of Funan (1st to 7th century) covers much of mainland Southeast Asia including present-day Cambodia, Laos, Myanmar, Thailand, and Vietnam.

Funan (1st–7th century) was the first kingdom in Cambodian history and it was also the first Indianized kingdom that prospered in Southeast Asia. Both Hinduism and Buddhism flourished in this kingdom. According to the Chinese records, two Buddhist monks from Funan, named Mandrasena and Sanghapala, took up residency in China in the 5th to 6th centuries, and translated several Buddhist sūtras from Sanskrit (or a Prakrit) into Chinese.

The oldest archaeological evidence of Indianized civilization in Southeast Asia comes from central Burma, central and southern Thailand, and the lower Mekong Delta. These finds belong to the period of Funan Kingdom or Nokor Phnom, present-day Cambodia, and South Vietnam including part of Burma, Laos, and Thailand, which was the first political centre established in Southeast Asia. Taking into account the epigraphic and archaeological evidence, the Suvarṇabhūmi mentioned in the early texts must be identified with these areas. Of these areas, only Funan had maritime links with India through its port at Óc Eo. Therefore, although Suvarṇabhūmi in time was broadly applied to all lands east of India, particularly Sumatra, its earliest application was probably to Funan. Furthermore, the Chinese term of “Funan” for Cambodia, may be a transcription of the "Suvaṇṇa" in “Suvaṇṇabhumī”.

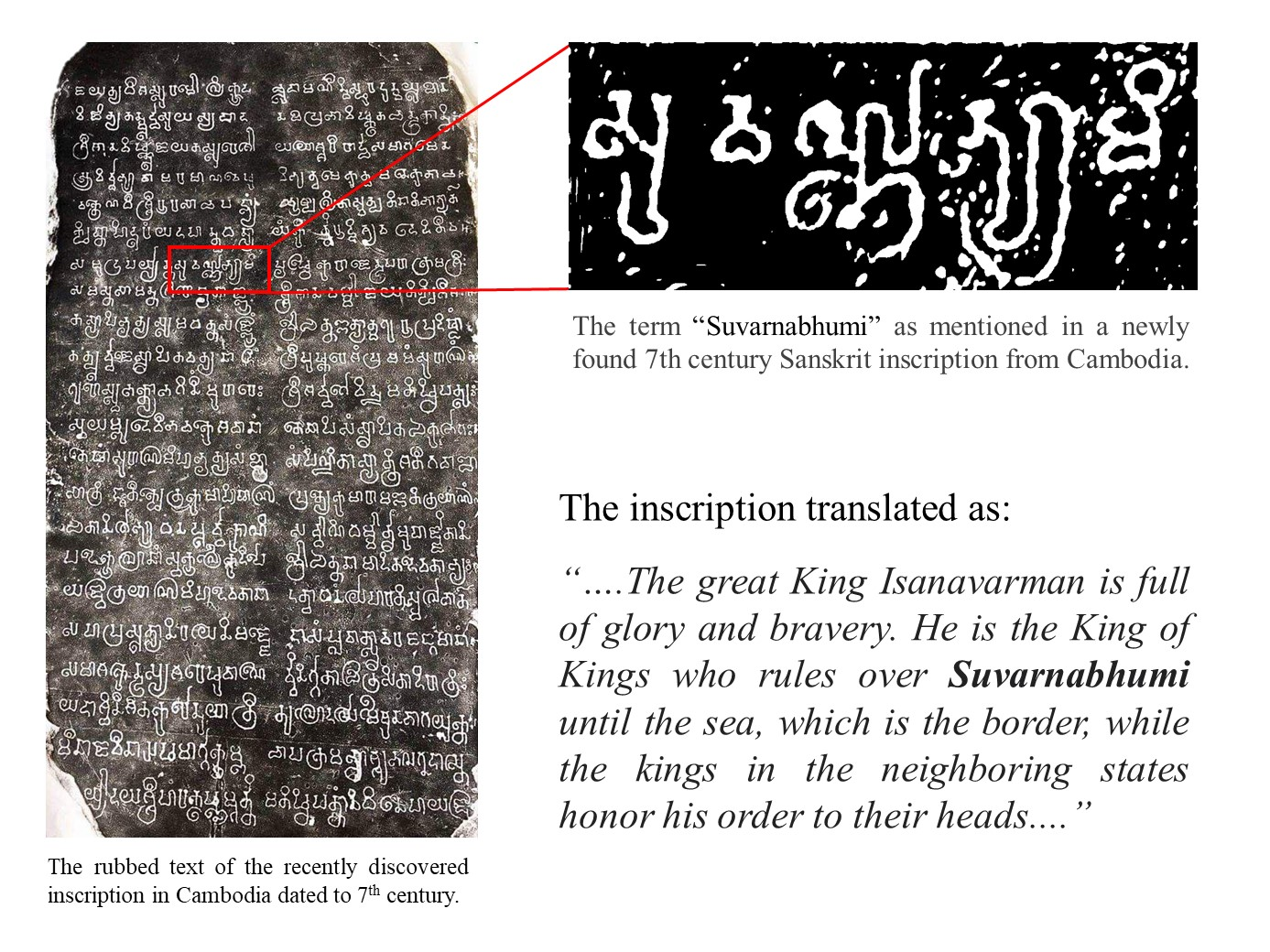
The oldest Southeast Asian inscription from Cambodia, dated to the 7th century, issued during the reign of King Isanavarman I, identifies Suvarnabhumi with the kingdom of Chenla (6th-9th century), the successor of Funan (1st-7th century).

In December 2017, Dr Vong Sotheara, of the Royal University of Phnom Penh, discovered a Pre-Angkorian stone inscription in the Province of Kampong Speu, Basedth District, which he tentatively dated to 633 AD. According to him, the inscription would “prove that Suvarnabhumi was the Khmer Empire.” The inscription was issued in the reign of King Isanavarman I (616–637 AD) of the Cambodian Kingdom of Chenla, the successor of Funan and the predecessor of the Khmer Empire. The inscription, translated, read:

“The great King Isanavarman is full of glory and bravery. He is the King of Kings, who rules over Suvarnabhumi until the sea, which is the border, while the kings in the neighbouring states honour his order to their heads”.

The Inscription is the oldest found mention of Suvarṇabhūmi in Southeast Asia, identifying it with Chenla. The inscription is now exhibited in the National Museum of Cambodia in Phnom Penh. However, his claim and the findings are yet to be peer-reviewed, and remain in doubt with other historians and archaeology experts across the region.

==== Myanmar ====
Mon tradition maintains that the Thaton Kingdom in Lower Myanmar was called Suvannabhumi (Burmese: သုဝဏ္ဏဘူမိ Thuwunnabhumi). However, dating the Thaton Kingdom independent of traditional chronicles gives an terminus post quem foundation year of 825; even this date remains unattested.

There are several sites within Mon State that local archaeologists cite as Suvarṇabhūmi. Suvarnabhumi City in Bilin Township is one such site with limited excavation work. The site, called Winka Old City by other archaeologists, contains 40 high-grounds of which only four have been excavated. The Winka site, along with nearby walled sites like Kyaikkatha and Kelasa, have been dated as early as the sixth century. While the archaeology of early Lower Burmese sites requires more work, other urban centres in Myanmar like the Sri Ksetra Kingdom in modern Pyay were Buddhist as early as the 5th century.

The scholarly search for Suvannabhumi within Myanmar is attached to various nationalistic and religious narratives about Suvannabhumi. The fifteenth century legend of Shwedagon Pagoda enshrining a few hairs of the Buddha brought back by Mon merchants highlights the cultural significance placed on early Buddhist missionaries in Myanmar. In many such legends, the narrative of the conversion of Suvarṇabhūmi is that it Burmanizes key historical Buddhist figures.

==== Thailand ====
In modern Thailand, government proclamations and national museums insist that Suwannaphum was somewhere on the coast of the central plain, especially at the ancient city of U Thong, which might be the origin of the Mon Dvaravati Culture. These claims are not based on any historical records but on archaeological evidence of human settlements in the area dating back more than 4,000 years and the findings of 3rd-century Roman coins. The Thai government named the new Bangkok airport, Suvarnabhumi Airport, after the mythic kingdom of Suwannaphum, honouring this tradition that is still debated by scholars for the same reasons as the Burman claim. Suphan Buri (from the Sanskrit, Suvarnapura, "Golden City") in present west/central Thailand, was founded in 877-882 as a city of the Mon-speaking kingdom of Dvaravati with the name, Meuang Thawarawadi Si Suphannaphumi ("the Dvaravati city of Suvarṇabhūmi"), indicating that Dvaravati at that time identified as Suvarṇabhūmi.

Manop Nakkarnrian and his co-authors, reviewing the U Thong evidence in 2025, record that many scholars do not accept the identification of the lower central plain with the Suvarṇabhūmi of Ashoka's mission, for want of clear archaeological evidence. Most of what has been recovered there shows only trade contact with India from the late Indian Iron Age, in etched and plain agate and carnelian beads and in high-tin bronze vessels. The same review reports Somjet Thinnaphong and colleagues, in a 2019 volume issued by the Thai Ministry of Science and Technology. They hold that a century of work on Indian, Lankan, Greek, Roman and Chinese sources, and on later archaeological evidence, agrees that Suvarṇabhūmi was real. On their account it had reached the level of a city-state or kingdom about 2,000 years ago.

According to Thai chronicles, around 241 BCE, during the times that two Buddhist monks named Sona Thera and Uttara Thera came from Magadha to spread Buddhism to Suvarṇabhūmi, the majority of the kingdom's population were Mon people, while Thai people arrived later, around 50 BCE. The Suvarnabhumi Kingdom was destroyed by the invasion of Funan around the 1st-2nd centuries, and most of its population was forcibly moved to Funan resulting in it being left abandoned. After Funan lost to Bhavavarman I of Chenla in 550, Suvarṇabhūmi de facto became a tributary state of Chenla as well.

The kingdom's area reached Lamphakappa Nakhon (ลัมภกัปปะนคร, present-day Lampang) in the north, and was ruled in mandala style with five royal cities, including Suvarnabhumi (the present old town of Nakhon Pathom), Ratchaburi, Singburi, Phetchaburi, and Tanintharyi.

The area surrounding the old capital of Suvarnabhumi was resettled in 590 when Sri Sittichai Phromthep (ท้าวศรีสิทธิไชยพรหมเทพ) from Yossothon (possibly the city in Chenla) established the new city, Nakhon Chai Si (old name of the present-day Nakhon Pathom). Most of its population were Thai people from the Ngao, Yom, and Salween river basins. Lavo was also founded during such a period. Both later created a new kingdom, Dvaravati; however, the new capital together with the other nearest settlement, Pong Tuek (พงตึก, present-day Ratchaburi) were sacked by Chenla 300 years later, around the 8th-9th centuries. After that, the center of Dvaravati culture shifted to Lavo, and the people of the sacked Dvaravati moved westward and founded a new city in 807 in the area of the present-day Ladya subdistrict, Kanchanaburi (Kanchanaburi old city) while the affected area was almost left abandoned. The new settlement was named Suvarṇabhūmi and was then renamed Sri Ayutthaya and Kanchanaburi, respectively.

At the peak of power around the 13th-14th centuries, the border of the new Suvarṇabhūmi or Suphannabhumi met Lavo Kingdom at the Pasak River in the east, the west to Dawei on the coast of the outer sea (Andaman Sea), northwest to the south of Mawlamyine, which was the sea trading harbor of the Chaliang Kingdom (Si Satchanalai), while the south to the tip of the Malay Peninsula, and the north to Phraek Siracha (present-day Sankhaburi). In 1351, the Suphannabhumi Kingdom was merged into its succeeding state, Ayuttaya, after its last ruler, Uthong, moved eastward to create a new capital Ayutthaya on present-day Ayutthaya Island.

=== Insular Southeast Asia ===
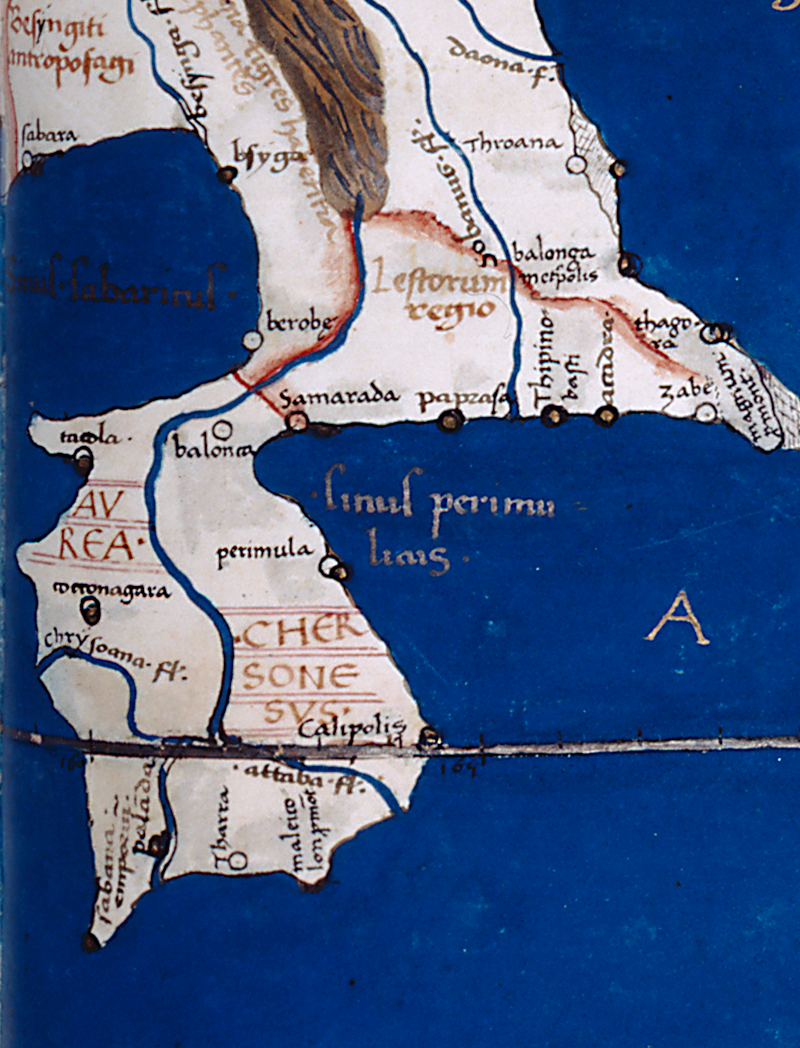
The Golden Chersonese - details from the eleventh map of Asia (Southeast Asia). Details from Nicolaus Germanus' 1467 copy of a map from Ptolemy's Geography, showing the Golden Chersonese, i.e. the Malay Peninsula. The horizontal line represents the Equator, which is misplaced too far north due to its being calculated from the Tropic of Cancer using the Ptolemaic degree, which is only five-sixths of a true degree.

A clue referring to the Malay Peninsula came from Claudius Ptolemy's Geography, who referred to it as Golden Chersonese (literally 'golden peninsula'), which pinpointed exactly that location in South East Asia.

The term Suvarṇabhūmi ('land of gold') is commonly thought to refer to the Southeast Asian Peninsula, including lower Burma and the Malay Peninsula. However there is another gold-referring term Suvarnadvipa (the Golden Island or Peninsula, where “–dvipa” may refer to either a peninsula or an island), which may correspond to the Indonesian Archipelago, especially Sumatra. Both terms might refer to a powerful coastal or island kingdom in present-day Indonesia, possibly centered on Sumatra or Java. This corresponds to the gold production areas traditionally known in Minangkabau Highlands in Barisan Mountains, Sumatra, and interior Borneo. The eighth-century Indian text Samaraiccakaha describes a sea voyage to Suvarnadvipa and the making of bricks from the gold rich sands which they inscribed with the name “dharana” and then baked. These pointing out to the direction of western Insular Southeast Asia, especially Sumatra, the Malay Peninsula, Borneo and Java.

Benefitting from its strategic location on the narrow Strait of Malacca, the insular theory argued that other than actually producing gold, it might also be based on such a kingdom's potential for power and wealth (hence, "Land of Gold") as a hub for sea-trade also known from vague descriptions of contemporary Chinese pilgrims to India. The kingdom referred to as the center of maritime trade between China and India was Srivijaya. Due to the Chinese writing system, however, the interpretations of Chinese historical sources are based on supposed correspondences of ideograms – and their possible phonetic equivalents – with known toponyms in the ancient Southeast Asian civilizations. Hendrik Kern concluded that Sumatra was the Suvarnadvipa mentioned in ancient Hindu texts and the island of Chryse mentioned in the Periplus of the Erythraean Sea and by Rufius Festus Avienius.

The Chinese pilgrim and Buddhist scholar Yijing (義淨), visited the kingdom of Srivijaya on Sumatra in 672 and identified it with Suvarnadvipa, the Island of Gold (金洲 jin-zhou).

The interpretation of early travel records is not always easy. Javanese embassies to China in 860 and 873 CE refer to Java as rich in gold, although it was in fact devoid of any deposits. The Javanese would have had to import gold possibly from neighbouring Sumatra, the Malay Peninsula or Borneo, where gold was still being mined in the 19th century and where ancient mining sites were located. Even though Java did not have its own gold deposits, the texts make frequent references to the existence of goldsmiths, and it is clear from the archaeological evidence such as Wonoboyo Hoard, that this culture had developed a sophisticated gold working technology, which relied on the import of substantial quantities of the metal.

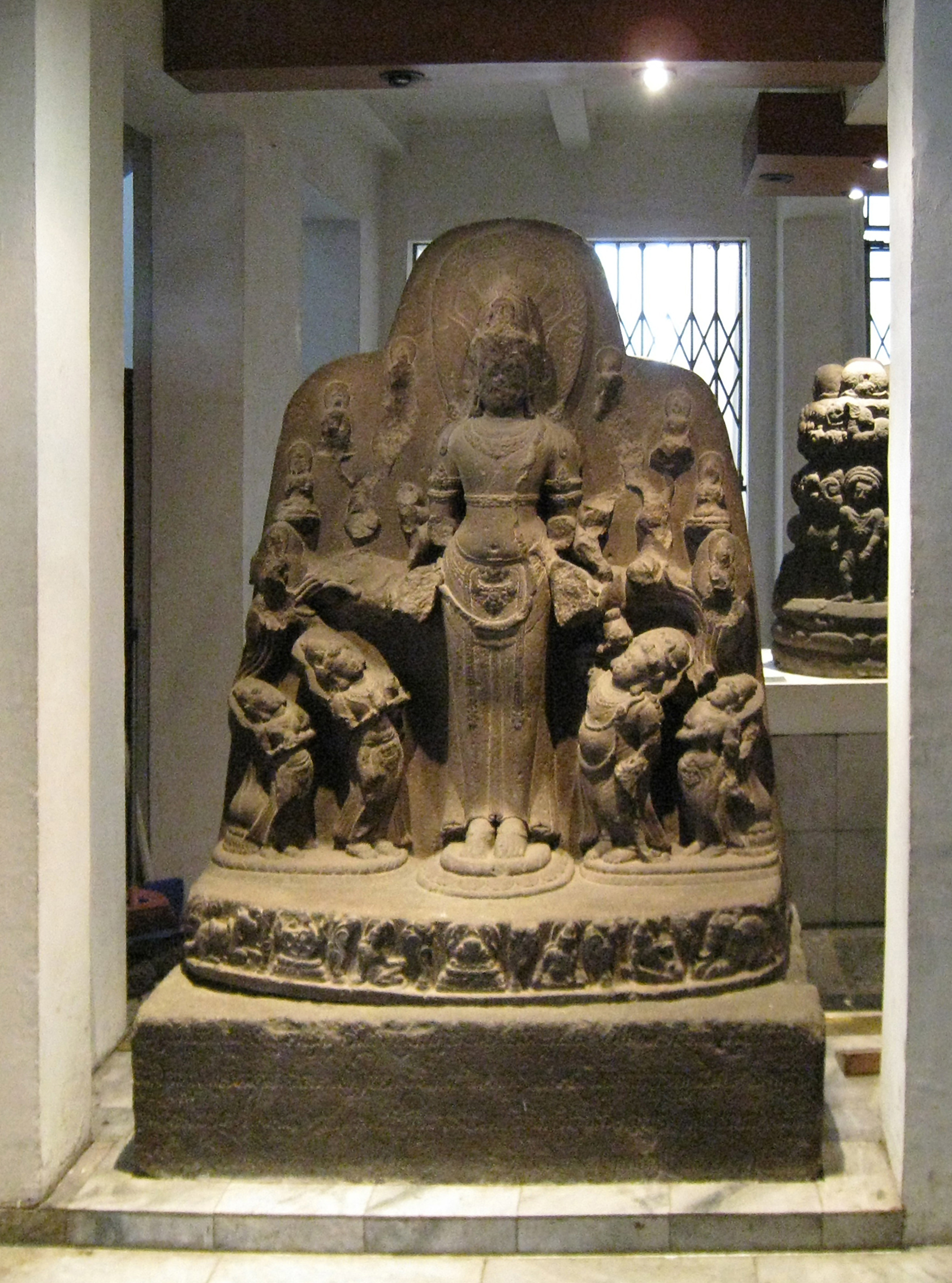
Padang Roco Inscription dated 1286 from Sumatra, mentioned the statue of Amoghapasa Lokesvara taken from Bhumi Jawa to Suvarṇabhūmi (Sumatra), in order to be erected at Dharmasraya

The Padang Roco Inscription of 1286 CE, states that an image of Buddha Amoghapasa Lokeshvara was brought to Dharmasraya on the Upper Batang Hari - the river of Jambi - was transported from Bhumi Java (Java) to Suvarnabhumi (Sumatra), and erected by order of the Javanese ruler Kertanegara: the inscription clearly identifies Sumatra as Suvarṇabhūmi.

Butuan on the southern Philippine island of Mindanao was rich in treasures. A museum curator, Florina H. Capistrano-Baker, stated it was even richer than the more well-known western maritime kingdom of Srivijaya; “The astonishing quantities and impressive quality of gold treasures recovered in Butuan suggest that its flourishing port settlement played an until recently little-recognized role in early Southeast Asian trade.The amount of gold discovered in Butuan far exceeds that found in Sumatra, where the flourishing kingdom of Srivijaya is said to have been located.” This despite that most of the gold of Butuan were already looted by invaders.

=== Bangladesh ===
A popular interpretation of Rabindranath Tagore's poem Amar Shonar Bangla serves as the basis for the claim that Suvarṇabhūmi was actually situated in central Bengal at Sonargaon. In some Jain texts, it is mentioned that merchants of Anga (in present-day Bihar, a state of India that borders with Bengal) regularly sailed to Suvarṇabhūmi, and ancient Bengal was in fact situated very close to Anga, connected by rivers of the Ganges-Brahmaputra Delta. Bengal has also been described in ancient Indian and Southeast Asian chronicles as a "seafaring country", enjoying trade relations with Dravidian kingdoms, Sri Lanka, Java and Sumatra. Sinhalese tradition holds that the first king of Sri Lanka, Vijaya Singha, came from Bengal. Moreover the region is commonly associated with golden color - the soil of Bengal is known for its golden color (Gangetic alluvial), golden harvest (rice), golden fruits (mangoes), golden minerals (gold and clay) and yellow-brown skinned people. Bengal is described in ancient Sanskrit texts as 'Gaud-Desh' (Golden/Radiant land). During the reign of the Bengal Sultans and the Mughal Empire, central Bengal was home to a prosperous trading town called "Sonargaon" (Golden village), which was connected to North India by the Grand Trunk Road and was frequented by Arab, Persian and Chinese travelers, including Ibn Battuta and Zheng He. Even today, Bengalis often refer to their land as 'Shonar Bangla' (Golden Bengal), and the national anthem of Bangladesh - Amar Shonar Bangla (My Bengal of Gold), from Tagore's poem - is a reference to this theory.

== European Age of Discovery ==
The thirst for gold formed the most powerful incentive to explorers at the beginning of modern times; but although more and more extensive regions were brought to light by them, they sought in vain in the East Indian Archipelago for the Gold and Silver Islands where, according to the legends, the precious metals were to be gathered from the ground and did not need to be laboriously extracted from the interior of the earth. In spite of their failure, they found it difficult to give up the alluring picture. When they did not find what they sought in the regions which were indicated by the old legends and by the maps based thereon, they hoped for better success in still unexplored regions, and clutched with avidity at every hint that they were here to attain their object.

The history of geography thus shows us how the Gold and Silver Islands were constantly, so to speak, wandering towards the East. Marco Polo spoke, in the most exaggerated language, of the wealth of gold in Zipangu, situated at the extremity of this part of the world, and had thus pointed out where the precious metals should preferably be sought. Martin Behaim, on his globe of 1492, revived the Argyre and Chryse of antiquity in these regions.

In 1519, Cristóvão de Mendonça, was given instructions to search for the legendary Isles of Gold, said to lie to "beyond Sumatra", which he was unable to do, and in 1587 an expedition under the command of Pedro de Unamunu was sent to find them in the vicinity of Zipangu (Japan). According to Antonio de Herrera y Tordesillas, in 1528 Álvaro de Saavedra Cerón in the ship Florida on a voyage from the Moluccas to Mexico reached a large island which he took for the Isla del Oro. This island has not been identified although it seems likely that it is Biak, Manus or one of the Schouten Islands on the north coast of New Guinea.

== General references ==
- Thepthani, Phra Borihan (1953). Thai National Chronicles: the history of the nation since ancient times (in Thai). S. Thammasamakkhi. Archived from the original on 5 November 2023.

== See also ==
- Golden Chersonese
- Greater India
- Nanyang (region)
