= Kuburajo inscription =

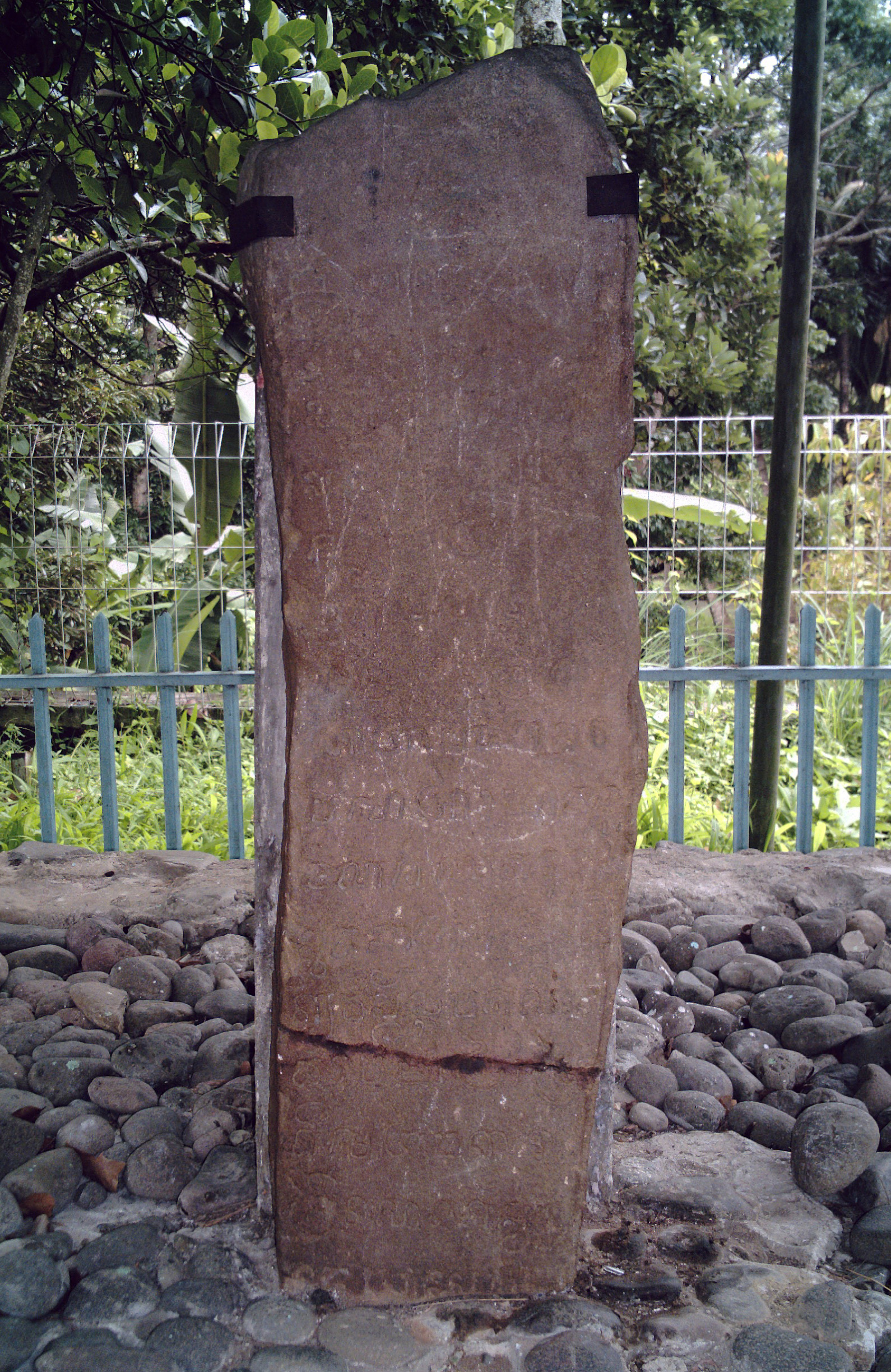
Kuburajo inscription (August 2010)

Kuburajo Inscription, also called Kuburajo I Inscription, is one of the many inscriptions left by King Adityawarman of central Sumatra. The inscription was found in Kuburajo village, Lima Kaum district, Tanah Datar Regency, West Sumatra, Indonesia in 1877 besides the main road from Batusangkar city to Padang city. The inscription was registered by N.J. Krom in Inventaris der Oudheden in de Padangsche Bovenlanden ('Inventory of Antiquities in the Padang Highlands', OV 1912: 41). The inscription is written in Sanskrit, and consists of 16 lines. This inscription was lost in 1987, but was rediscovered.

When first publishing about the inscription in 1913, H. Kern initially thought that it was a memorial tombstone (Dutch: grafsteen) of King Adityawarman; based on the name of the discovery village Kuburajo (kubur = tomb, and rajo = king). F.D.K. Bosch refined this interpretation in Verslag van een reis door Sumatra ('Report of a trip through Sumatra', OV 1930: 133-57), based on Minangkabau language, to the "king's fort" (kubu = fort).

== Content ==
The inscription begins with referring to Adwayawarman as King Adityawarman's father. The king's title as Kanakamedinindra ('Gold Land Lord') was mentioned; and he was likened to Kalpataru, a wish-fulfilling divine tree. Adityawarman was also stated as descended from the Kulisadhara dynasty, and was seen as a manifestation of Lokeshvara and Mai.. (possibly Maitreya).

== Text ==
The inscription text according to Kern's transcription, as follows:

1. Om mamla viragara
2. Advayavarmma
3. mputra Kanaka
4. medinīndra
5. sukrta a vila
6. bdhakusalaprasa
7. ǁdhruǁ maitri karu
8. na a mudita u
9. peksa a ǁ yacakka
10. janakalpatarurupa
11. mmadana ǁaǁ Adi
12. tyavarmma mbhupa kulisa
13. dharavansa ǀoǀ pra
14. tiksa avatara
15. srilokesvara
16. deva ǁ mai

== See also ==
- Pagaruyung Kingdom
