= Grahi inscription =

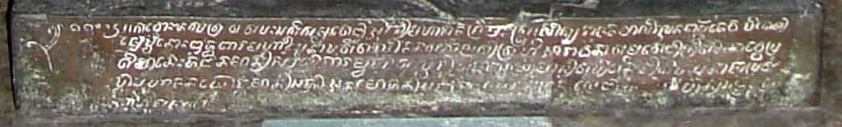
- The five-line inscription

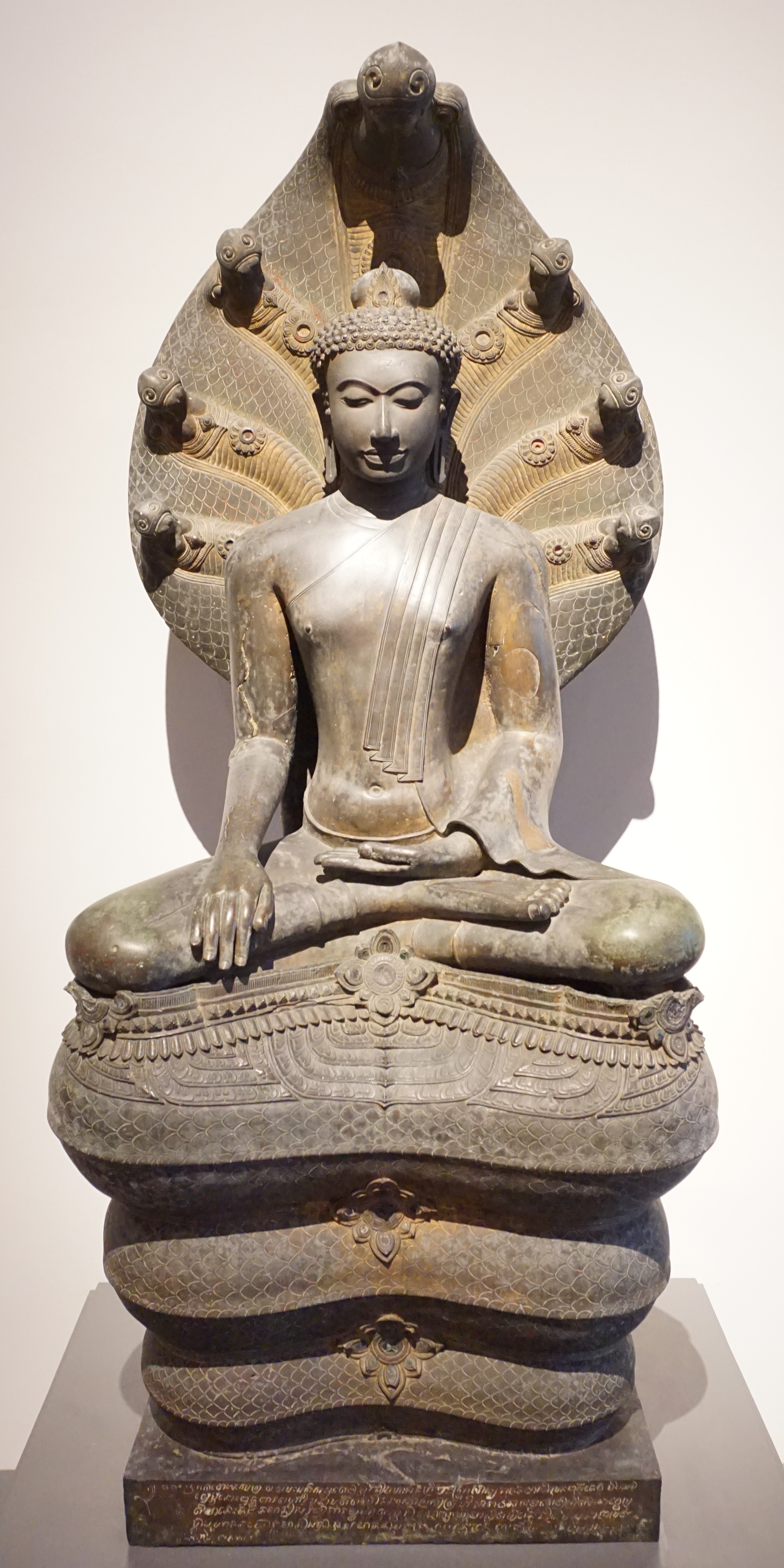
- The inscription in situ, at the pedestal of the 12th-century Buddha statue, Bangkok National Museum
- Type: Inscription
- Writing: Old Khmer
- Created: 1183
- Discovered: 1904 in Wat Wiang, Chaiya
- Present location: Bangkok National Museum

Grahi inscription (Thai: จารึกครหิ; RTGS: kharahi), or officially Than Phra Phuttharup Wat Hua Wiang Inscription (Thai: จารึกบนฐานพระพุทธรูปวัดหัวเวียง; lit. 'the inscription on the base of a Buddha statue in Wat Hua Wiang') is an inscription found in Chaiya, southern Thailand, written in Old Khmer language with Old Sumatran script, and dated to 1183 CE. The five-line inscription is written on the pedestal of a bronze Buddha statue that was discovered in 1904 at Wat Wiang temple in Chaiya and was stored at Wat Hua Wiang temple. The Buddha statue is currently a collection of Bangkok National Museum. The name Grahi, called Kia-lo-hi in the Chinese Zhu Fan Zhi record, is considered to be the old name of Chaiya. The city was part of Tambralinga, once a border polity between Srivijaya and Khmer kingdoms in the Malay Peninsula.

Damrong Rajanubhab found the statue at the wihan of Wat Wiang Temple in Chaiya district, Surat Thani province during his governmental inspection visit to the southern coastal provinces in 1904. Phraya Worasit Sewiwat (Taihak), then provincial governor of Monthon Chumphon was assigned by Damrong Rajanubhab to ship the statue to him in Bangkok, alongside two other inscriptions from the same wihan (later titled Wat Hua Wiang Mueang Chaiya Inscription No. 1 and 2). The items arrived in Bangkok on 31 October 1904 with the Phum Riang district governor Luang Sewi Worarat (Daeng), who was appointed by the provincial governor, accompanying the delivery.

Older names of the inscription as registered in Thai official records include S.D.9 and 25th inscription; at the base of Wat Hua Wiang's Buddha statue.

== Text ==
The transliteration of the inscription according to Cœdès is as follows:

1. 11006 (sic) çaka thoḥ nakṣatra ta tapaḥ sakti kamrateṅ añ Mahārāja çrīmat Trailokyarājamaulibhūṣanabarmmadeba pi ket
2. jyeṣṭha noḥ buddhabāra Mahāsenāpati Galānai ta cāṃ sruk Grahi ārādhanā ta mrateṅ çrī Ñāno thve pra
3. timā neḥ daṃṅon mān saṃrit bhāra mvay tul bir ta jā byāy mās tap tanliṅ ti ṣthāpanā jā prati
4. mā mahājana phoṅ ta mān sarddhā ‘anumodanā pūjā ṇamaskāra nu neḥ leṅ sa -- pān sarvvajñatā
5. — ha ta jā --

== Translation ==
The approximate translation of the inscription is as follows:

In the year of Saka 1105 (1183 CE), on the orders of Kamraten An Maharaja Srimat Trailokyaraja Maulibhusanavarmadeva, on the third day of the rising month of Jyestha, Wednesday, Mahasenapati Galanai [Talanai], who governs the land of Grahi, invited Mraten Sri Nano to create this statue. The weight of samrit is 1 bhara 2 tula and the value of gold is 10 tamlin. This statue has been erected so that all the faithful can enjoy, venerate, and adore it here .... obtain the omniscience ..

== See also ==
- Chaiya District in southern Thailand
- Dharmasraya kingdom
- Mauli dynasty
