= Akarendrawarman =

Akarendrawarman was a ruler of Malayapura kingdom in the Minangkabau plateau. His name was found in the Pagaruyung VII inscription, which is written in Old Malay, his full title is Paduka Sri Maharajadhiraja Srimat Sri Akarendrawarman. In carrying out his administration, he was assisted by various other officials, among others was a minister called Tuhan (lord) Parpatih. The kingdom was mentioned to be located in Parhyangan on Mount Mahameru (Mount Marapi).

De Casparis concluded that Akarendrawarman was the predecessor of King Adityawarman, and that the inscription explained the move of the kingdom's capital from Jambi to West Sumatra. However, that reading conclusion is seen as incorrect by Griffiths and Miksic.

== See also ==
- Bijayendrawarman
- Mauli dynasty
