= Dharmasraya =

Capital of the Melayu Kingdom

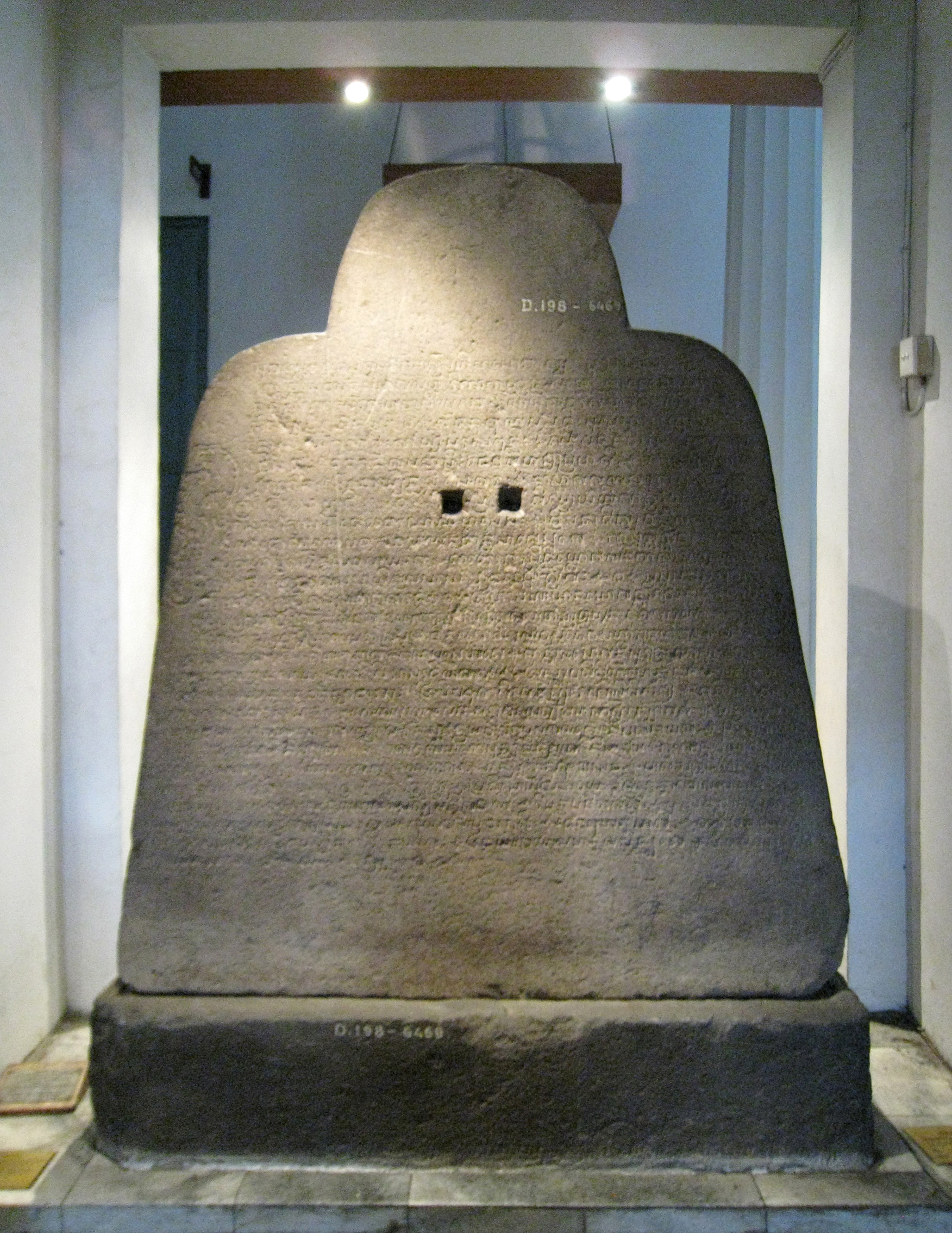
Padang Roco inscription where the name Dharmasraya was mentioned

Dharmasraya or Dharmmāśraya was the capital of the 11th century Buddhist polity known as Melayu Kingdom, based on the Batanghari river system in modern-day West Sumatra and Jambi, on the island of Sumatra, Indonesia. The kingdom itself could be identified by the name of its capital Dharmasraya or by the name Bhumi Malayu or Suvarnnabhumi according to Padang Roco Inscription.

== Formation ==
After the invasion by Rajendra Chola I the king of the Chola Empire from Koromandel, authority of Sailendra dynasty over the islands of Sumatera and the Malay Peninsula weakened. Some time later came a new dynasty that took over the role of Sailendra Dynasty, called by the name of Mauli dynasty. The Dharmasraya can be considered as the successor of Srivijaya.

The oldest inscription bearing the name of Maharaja Mauli is the Grahi inscription dated 1183 discovered in Chaiya (Grahi) Malay Peninsula, Southern Thailand. The inscription bears the order of Maharaja Srimat Trailokyaraja Maulibhusana Warmadewa to the bhupati (regent) of Grahi named Mahasenapati Galanai to make a statue of Buddha weight 1 bhara 2 tula with the value of 10 gold tamlin. The artist name that responsible to create the statue is Mraten Sri Nano.

The second inscription from Mauli dynasty appear approximately a hundred years later in 1286. The inscription in which the name Dharmasraya (and the name of king Srimat Tribhuwanaraja Mauli Warmadewa) appears dates from the 13th century, namely the Padang Roco inscription discovered around the headwaters of Batanghari river (now Dharmasraya Regency in West Sumatera), dated 1286.

== List of rulers ==
The Maharajas of Dharmasraya:

Date	King's of name	Capital	Stone inscription or embassies to China and events
1183	Srimat Trailokyaraja Maulibhusana Warmadewa	Dharmasraya	Grahi inscription 1183 at Chaiya, South of Thailand, the order to regent Grahi, namely Mahasenapati Galanai to make a Buddha stone.
1286	Srimat Tribhuwanaraja Mauli Warmadewa	Dharmasraya	Padang Roco inscription 1286 at Siguntur, (now Dharmasraya regency), Pamalayu expedition.
1347	Srimat Sri Udayadityawarman Pratapaparakrama Rajendra Mauli Warmadewa	Pagaruyung	Moved to Pagaruyung Amoghapasa Statue 1347 at Dharmasraya, Kuburajo inscription at Pagaruyung (now Tanah Datar regency).

== See also ==
- History of Indonesia
- Melayu Kingdom
- Srivijaya
- Malay
