= Adityawarman =

King of Malayapura Suvarnabhumi (1294–1375)

- Srimat Sri Udayadityawarman Pratapaparakrama Rājendra Maulimali Warmadewa: Lord of the Golden Earth; Sang Arya Dewaraja Mpu Aditya; Mantrolot Warmadewa; Sengk'ia-lie-yu-lan
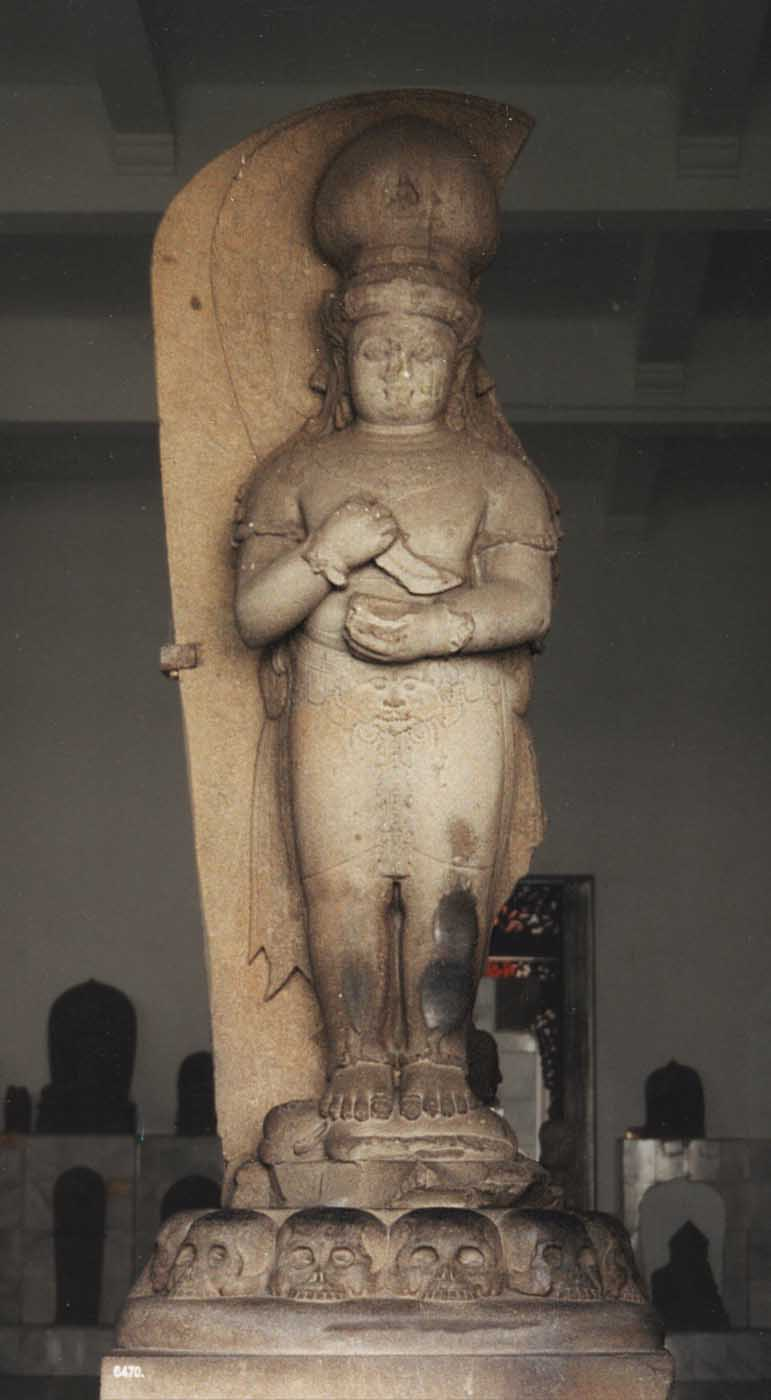
- Adityawarman as Bhairava idol, in the National Museum of Indonesia
- Reign: 1347–1375
- Predecessor: Akarendrawarman
- Successor: Ananggawarman
- Born: 1294; Trowulan, Majapahit or Siguntur, West Sumatra
- Died: 1375 (aged 80–81); Batusangkar
Names
- Adtyawarman
- House: Malayapura
- Dynasty: Mauli dynasty
- Father: Adwayawarman
- Mother: Dara Jingga
- Religion: Tantric Buddhism

Adityawarman (formal regnal name Maharajadiraja Srīmat Srī Udayādityawarma Pratāpaparākrama Rājendra Maulimāli Warmadewa. ) was a king of Malayapura Suvarnabhumi, and is the successor of the Mauli dynasty based in central Sumatra. He was the cousin of Jayanegara, king of Majapahit from 1309 to 1328, and the grandson of Tribhuwanaraja, king of Melayu Kingdom. Adityawarman was awarded the Senior Minister of Majapahit (wreddamantri) and used this authority to launch Majapahit military expansion plans and conquer east coast region in Sumatra. Adityawarman then founded the royal dynasty of Minangkabau in Pagaruyung and presided over the central Sumatra region to take control of the gold trade between 1347 and 1375.

== Early life ==
The exact date and place of Adityawarman’s birth remain uncertain. Scholars generally propose two principal possibilities: Sumatra, particularly the Minangkabau region or Java, within the sphere of Majapahit authority. Nevertheless, the Pararaton records that Adityawarman was born around 1294 in Trowulan, East Java, the capital of the kingdom of Majapahit. According to Kuburajo inscription found in Limo Kaum, West Sumatra, Adityawarman's father was Majapahit nobleman Adwayawarman; and according to the 15th East Javanese text Pararaton his mother was Dara Jingga, a Malay princess of Dharmasraya. He might have visited China for a diplomatic expedition in 1325 if, as some historians believe, he is the envoy whom a Chinese source calls Sengk'ia-lie-yu-lan.

According to George Coedes, "His name appears in Java as early as 1343 on an image of Bodhisattva Manjusri that was originally located in Candi Jago." This is the sanctuary built by Kertanegara for his father Visnuvardhana. In one of the various inscriptions about him, he explicitly calls himself Lord of the Golden Earth (Kanakamedinindra). An inscription in localised Malay Sanskrit found on the back of the Amoghapasa statue found at Rambahan, West Sumatra, dated 1347, written (and perhaps composed) by Adityawarman, commemorates his role as protector and source of welfare to the people of the capital of Malaya (Malayapura) and his power as an embodiment of Amoghapasa. "At Malayapura, Adityawarman bore the royal title of Udayadityavarman (or Adityavarmodaya) Pratapaparakrama Rājendra Maulimalivarmadewa, a title which one scholar believes he can detect an attempt at synthesis of the royal title traditionally in use in Srivijaya and Malayu." His kingdom is believed to be the predecessor of the present-day Minangkabau matrilineal society in Indonesia.

Adityawarman's inscriptions as a Sumatran ruler, show that he was a devotee of Tantric Buddhism. He ruled until at least 1375, the year of his last known inscription. He was described as the Lord of Suravasa; and the name Suruaso itself is still used to refer to the area near Pagaruyung, Kingdom of the Minangkabau people.

His son was Ananggawarman.

== See also ==
- Dharmasraya
- Pagaruyung Kingdom

Preceded by Akarendrawarman	King of Pagaruyung; 1347–1375 CE	Succeeded by Ananggawarman
