= Padang Roco Inscription =

Inscription found in West Sumatra, Indonesia

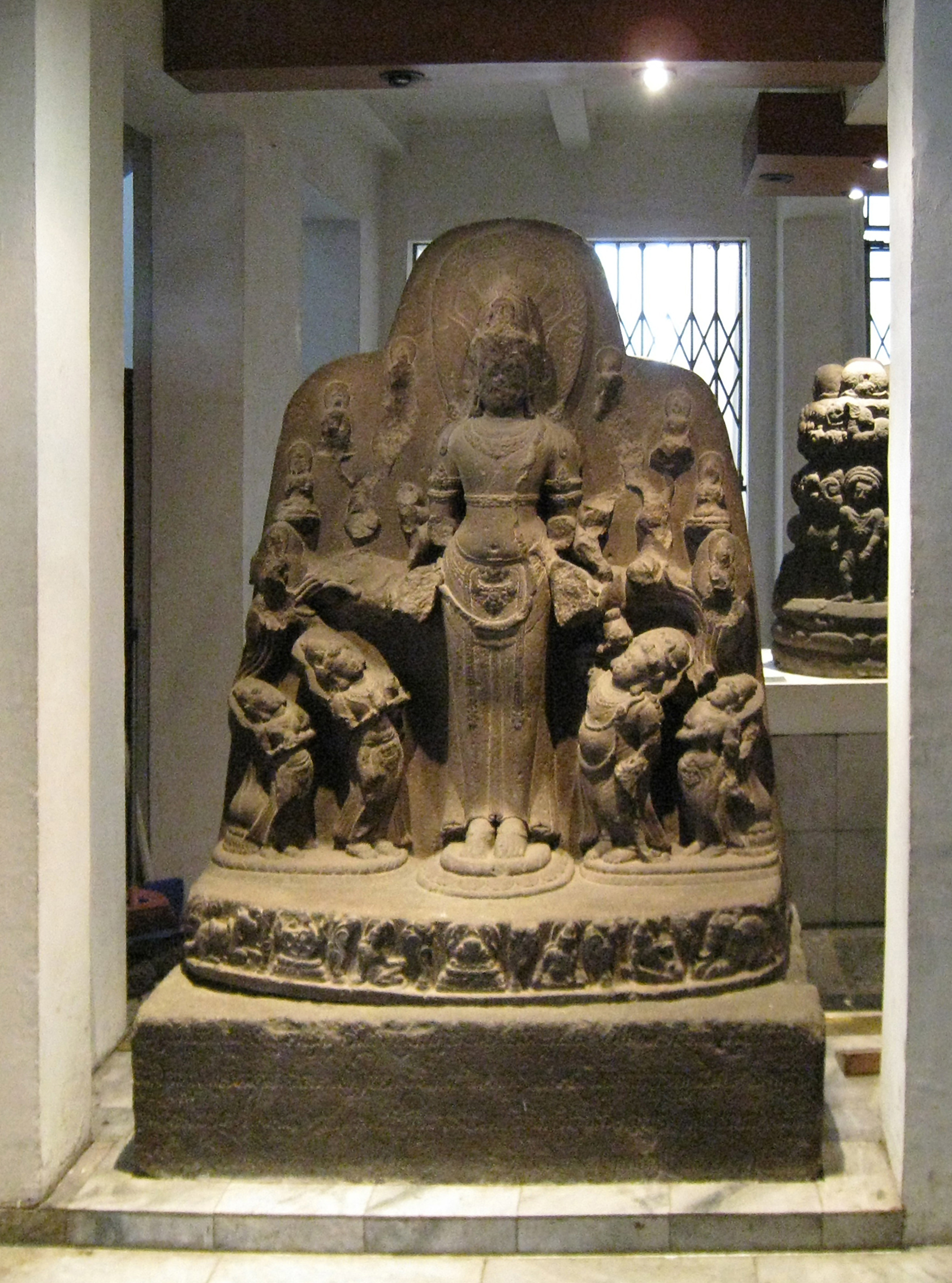
- The statue of Amoghapasa on top of the inscription.
- Material: Andesite stone
- Created: 1208 Saka or 1286 CE
- Discovered: Padangroco, nagari Siguntur, kecamatan Sitiung, Dharmasraya Regency, West Sumatra, Indonesia (1911)
- Present location: National Museum of Indonesia, Jakarta
- Registration: D.198-6468

The Padang Roco Inscription, in Indonesian Prasasti Padang Roco, is an inscription dated 1286 CE, discovered near the source of Batanghari river, Padangroco temple complex, Nagari Siguntur, Sitiung, Dharmasraya Regency, West Sumatra, Indonesia.

== Etymology ==
The inscription was named after the location where it was discovered; Padang Roco, which is the local Minangkabau language, translated to "field of statues". Padang means "field", while roco is equated to arca or murti, the image of Hindu-Buddhist deities.

== Description ==
The inscription was discovered in 1911 near the source of the Batanghari River, Padangroco. The inscription was carved on four sides of rectangular-shaped stone is served as the base of the Amoghapasa statue. On the back side of the statue carved inscription called Amoghapasa inscription dated from a later period in 1347 CE(NBG 1911: 129, 20e). The inscriptions were carved in ancient Javanese letters, using two languages (Old Malay and Sanskrit) (Krom 1912, 1916; Moens 1924; dan Pitono 1966). Today the inscription is stored in the National Museum of Indonesia, Jakarta, with inventory code numbers D.198-6468 (the base or inscription part) and D.198-6469 (the statue part).

== Origin ==
The inscription was dated 1208 Saka or 1286 CE, in the same period of Singhasari kingdom in Java and Melayu Kingdom Dharmasraya in Sumatra. The inscriptions tell that in the year 1208 Saka, under the order of King Kertanegara of Singhasari, a statue of Amoghapasa Lokeshvara was transported from Bhumijawa (Java) to Suvarnabhumi (Sumatra) to be erected at Dharmasraya. This gift made the people of Suvarnabhumi rejoice, especially their king Tribhuwanaraja Mauliwarmmadewa.

== Content ==
The content of the inscription as translated by Slamet Muljana:

1. Rejoice ! In the year Śaka 1208, in the month of Bādrawāda, first day of rising moon, Māwulu wāge day, Thursday, Wuku Madaṇkungan, with the king star located on southwest ...
2. .... that is the time of the statue of lord Amoghapasa Lokeśvara accompanied with all fourteen followers and also seven ratna jewel taken from bhūmi Jāwa to Swarnnabhūmi, in order to be erected at Dharmmāśraya,
3. as the gift of Srī Wiśwarūpa Kumāra. For that purpose pāduka Srī Mahārājādhirāja Kṛtanagara Wikrama Dharmmottunggadewa has ordered Rakryān Mahā-mantri Dyah Adwayabrahma, Rakryān Śirīkan Dyah Sugatabrahma and
4. Samagat Payānan hań Dīpankaradāsa, Rakryān Damun pu Wīra to presented lord Amoghapāśa. May this gift make all the people of bhūmi Mālayu, including its brāhmaṇa, ksatrya, waiśa, sūdra and especially the center of all āryyas; Srī Mahārāja Srīmat Tribhuwanarāja Mauliwarmmadewa.

== Adityawarman's addition ==
In 1347, Adityawarman moved the statue further uphill to Rambahan site near Langsat River, the source of Batanghari river. He also added inscription inscribed on the back side of the statue, this inscription refer as Amoghapasa inscription dated 1347 CE. While the rectangular base refer as Padang Roco inscription remain in Padang Roco area.
