= Pagaruyung IX inscription =

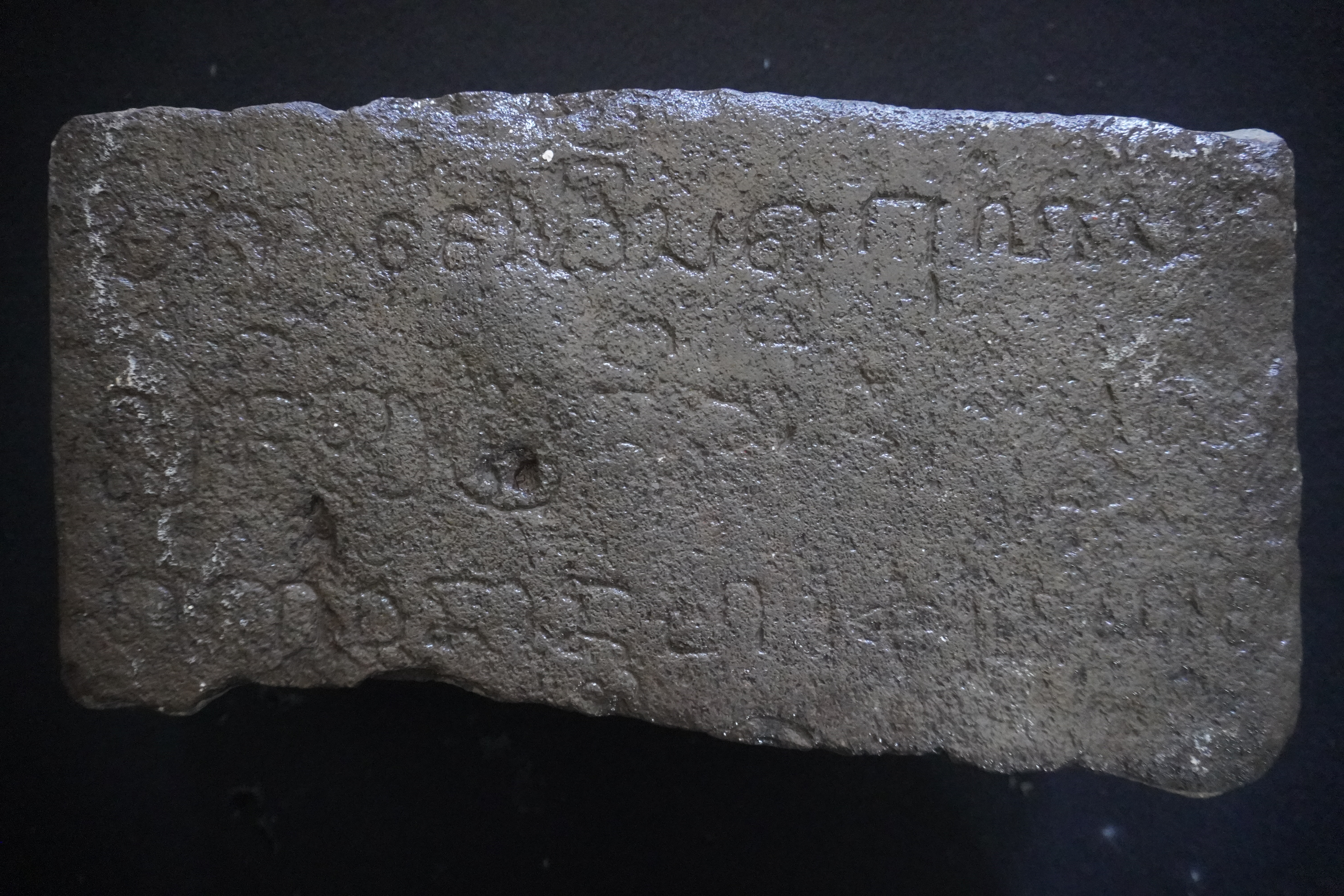
- Material: Andesite stone
- Writing: Post-Pallava Sumatran script
- Created: 1291 Śaka / 1369 CE
- Discovered: Ponggongan, Pagaruyung, West Sumatra, Indonesia
- Present location: Archaeological Heritage Preservation Office of Batusangkar, West Sumatra
- Coordinates: 0°28′45″S 100°37′25″E
- Registration: SMS-04/1/-/b/9
- Language: Sanskrit

Location
- Pagaruyung IX inscription (Sumatra) Location of Pagaruyung IX inscription

Pagaruyung IX inscription is a stone inscription believed to date back to the reign of King Adityawarman. This inscription is written on a piece of gray andesite stone in a condition where the writing is still relatively legible, even though it only consists of a few characters. This inscription contains the date 1291 Śaka or 1369 CE, and is written in Sanskrit language using the Post-Pallava Sumatran script. This inscription was found in the Ponggongan area, Pagaruyung Nagari, Tanjung Emas District, Tanah Datar Regency, West Sumatra, Indonesia, along with a number of other inscriptions.

Unlike other inscriptions from the reign of Adityawarman, which generally contain the names of figures or kings, this inscription does not mention any names in its content. Some researchers argue that this inscription, which only contains the date, is the upper part of a separate, more complete inscription.

This inscription is currently stored in the Collection Room of the Ancient Heritage Preservation Center (BP3) in Batusangkar, along with several other collections of inscriptions and ancient artifacts. This inscription is currently registered as a cultural heritage site in West Sumatra with the inventory number SMS-04/1/-b/9.

== Background ==
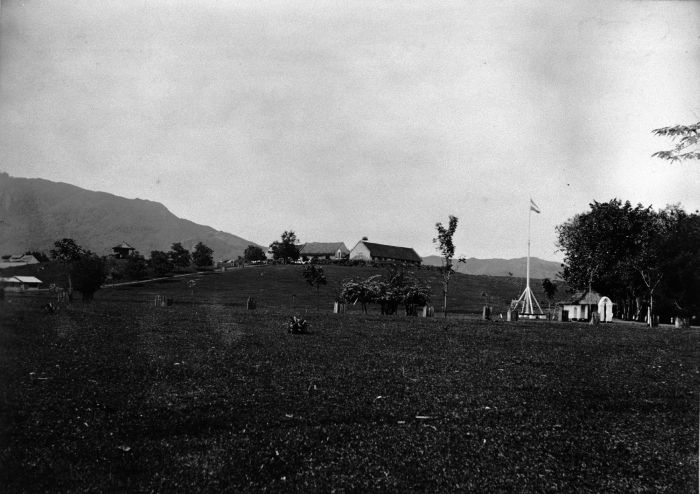
A photograph of the Van der Capellen Fort (c. 1895) in Batusangkar, West Sumatra. Collection of the Tropenmuseum, Amsterdam.

The Pagaruyung Inscription IX was first published by Nicolaas Johannes Krom, Chairman of the Archaeological Research Commission for Java and Madura in the Dutch East Indies, in the Oudheidkundig Verslag (Archaeological Report) of 1912. Krom was commissioned by the Dutch East Indies government through the Government Regulation No. 12 dated March 23, 1912, to research inscription artifacts around the Fort van der Capellen in Batusangkar, West Sumatra. This research was conducted in the last week of April 1912 to early May 1912.

In his report, Pagaruyung IX inscription was listed in an inventory of the Fort van der Capellen subdivision number 34, and specifically found in the Ponggongan area, Bukit Janggo Jorong, now part of Pagaruyung Nagari, Tanjung Emas District, Tanah Datar Regency. It was also mentioned that several other inscriptions were found in Ponggongan, including Pagaruyung V, Pagaruyung VIII, Pagaruyung X inscriptions, as well as a fourteen-line inscription found in the middle of a rice field (now known as the Ponggongan inscription).

Krom reported that at that time, that Pagaruyung IX inscription was still stored in Pagaruyung but had been planned for transfer to the museum in Batavia (now Jakarta). However, Istiawan (2006) noted that the inscription is currently housed in the collection room of the Archaeological Heritage Preservation Center (BP3) in Batusangkar, along with other collection of ancient inscriptions and artifact fragments. Therefore, its location remains in West Sumatra.

== Description ==
The Pagaruyung IX inscription is a piece of grayish andesite stone, flat in shape with dimensions of approximately 40 cm long and 12 cm wide. Its minimal thickness makes it unusual for a stone inscription. The size of this inscription is the smallest when compared to other inscriptions from the Adityawarman period.

This inscription contains a line of a date (candra sengkala). The condition of the writing is generally quite good, even though it only consists of one line. Krom describes this inscription as being decorated with a circle surrounded by eight lines resembling rays. On these lines, which resemble rays of light, there is text carved on both sides.

=== Transliteration ===
This inscription was initially translated and transcribed by Budi Istiawan (2006), who contended that it was composed in Old Javanese script. It was then re-read with minor modifications by Sri Ambarwati Kusumadewi (2012), a researcher from the University of Indonesia. She deduced that the Post-Pallava script was the script in use. Kusumadewi's transliteration of this inscription is as follows:

Śaka i ti(thi) satwa gun1a sa t(rs2) ni(?) ta _ ni_ (wa)rasati gata tha(wa)n(a) nr□pa_pata (Note: Kusumadewi provides additional notes for critical transliteration of certain words, namely ^{1} guna: guṇa, and ^{2} tṛṣni)

=== Translation ===
While Kusumadewi claims that solely Sanskrit was used to write the complete inscription, Istiawan contends that the language utilized in this inscription is similar to Old Javanese. Istiawan and Kusumadewi translated the inscription as follows:

According to Istiawan (2006):

In the past Śaka year (12)91 --king—

According to Kusumadewi (2012):

When the Śaka year (12)91 passed___king

== Interpretation ==
Pagaruyung IX inscription differs from others inscriptions that it does not mention any individual, making it unique within the context of Hindu-Buddhist historical relics in Sumatra. The majority of inscriptions from the reign of Adityawarman, by contrast, record the names of prominent figures, particularly Adityawarman himself, along with his various titles. This can be observed in the Ombilin inscription; the Amoghapāśa inscription; as well as the Pagaruyung I, II, III, IV, and V inscriptions; the Saruaso I and II inscriptions; the Rambatan inscription, the Kuburajo I inscription, and the Bandar Bapahat inscription, which even reference additional rulers such as Ananggawarman and Sri Akarendrawarman.

=== Date ===
The initial part of the inscription shows the presence of a chandrasengkala, which is a symbolic dating system (chronogram) that hides the year number in the form of a sentence or phrase. Istiawan states that this dating system is commonly found in Old Javanese inscriptions from the 8th to the 14th century CE on the island of Java.

In his book Selintas Prasasti dari Melayu Kuno (A Glimpse of Ancient Malay Inscriptions), he states that the readable portion of the text on the fragment of the Pagaruyung IX inscription contains a dating element. The text in question is written as satwa guna sa(trs)ne, with the following part unreadable. Based on the symbolic numerical values, satwa means 1 and guna means 9. Istiawan estimates that the next two words mean 2 and 1, based on the characteristics of inscriptions thought to originate from the time of Adityawarman. Through reverse reading (according to the rules of chandrasengkala), the resulting year is 1291 Saka or 1369 CE.

=== Script and language ===
The Post-Pallava script and Sanskrit language, which were employed in many inscriptions during the Adityawarman period, were used to write this Pagaruyung IX inscription. According to Louis-Charles Damais (1995), this Pallava script derivative evolved separately in Sumatra, giving rise to a writing system he refers to as the Ancient Sumatran script that has traits unique to that region. The Pagaruyung IX Inscription and other Adityawarman inscriptions use this Sumatran Post-Pallava script, which has features that set it apart from the Old Javanese (Kawi) script. This suggests that Sumatra's script development was distinct from Java's writing development.

When it came to referring to dates, praising the king or those who ordered the inscriptions to be written, recording the titles of rulers, and elucidating Buddhist teachings, Sanskrit played a significant role in the Ādityawarman inscriptions. The script and language used in Adityawarman's inscriptions vary; for example, they combine Old Malay, Old Javanese, and Sanskrit. Sanskrit was used to write the majority of Adityawarman's inscriptions, including the Pagaruyung IX Inscription. However, as Sumatra's native tongue, Old Malay was more frequently used for adjectives, official and positional names, and a few verbs. The same is true of Old Javanese, although it was not used very often.

The geopolitical, economic, and cultural background of Adityawarman's kingdom at the time—where local customs and external influences collided—is reflected in the use of diverse scripts and languages. Aspects of language use are typically highlighted in research on these inscriptions, especially due to the numerous irregularities in punctuation and compound word writing. Furthermore, differences in the identification of grammatical cases were also discovered. Overall, though, the Sanskrit grammar still followed the general guidelines that were in place in India.

== See also ==
- Dharmasraya
- History of Indian influence on Southeast Asia
- Melayu Kingdom
- Sanskrit inscriptions in Maritime Southeast Asia
