= Ponggongan inscription =

Archaeological stone relic, West Sumatra, Indonesia

- Ponggongan I inscription
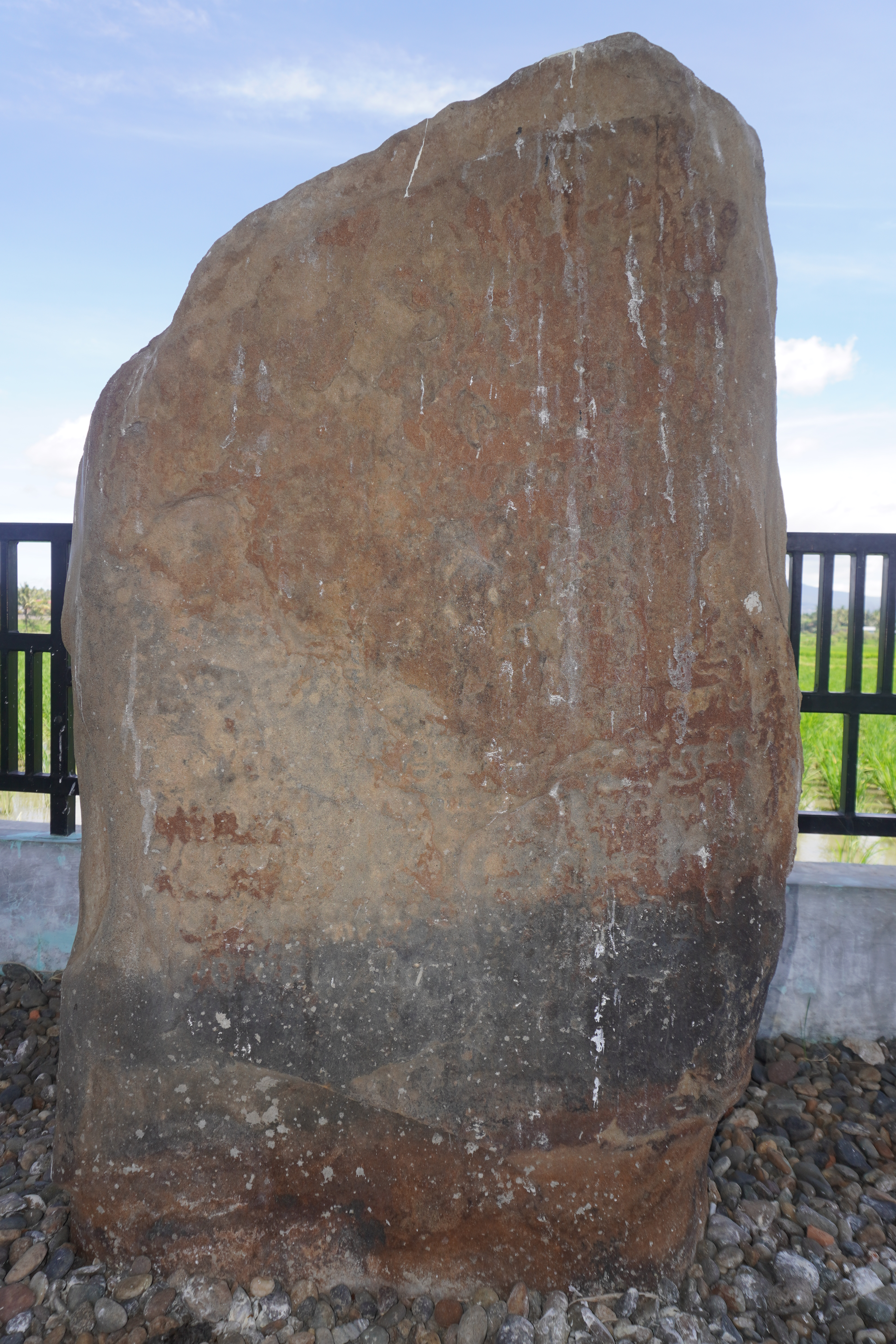
- Ponggongan inscription
- Type: Stone inscription
- Material: tuff
- Size: 150 cm × 90 cm × 30 cm
- Discovered: Late 19th CE
- Place: Ponggongan, Pagaruyung, Tanjung Emas, Tanah Datar, West Sumatra
- Present location: Ponggongan, Pagaruyung, Tanjung Emas, Tanah Datar, West Sumatra (in situ)
- Coordinates: 0.4718946°S 100.6093000°E
- Registration: 04/BCB-TB/A/12/2007

Location
- Ponggongan inscription (West Sumatra) Ponggongan inscription

Ponggongan inscription is an archaeological relic in the form of an ancient stone inscription found in Ponggongan, Pagaruyung, Tanjung Emas, Tanah Datar, West Sumatra, Indonesia. Also known as the Ponggongan I inscription, to distinguish it from other inscriptions discovered at the same site, it is estimated to date from the 13th or 14th century CE, around the reign of King Adityawarman. The inscription remains in situ, located in the middle of a rice field.

The inscription is made of tuff stone, and the writing has been badly eroded, making it difficult to read. No comprehensive interpretation of its contents has yet been made, though it is believed to have served as a memorial monument. Since 2010, the Ponggongan inscription has been designated a National Cultural Heritage object with inventory number 04/BCB-TB/A/12/2007 by the Ministry of Culture and Tourism of Indonesia

== Discovery and location ==
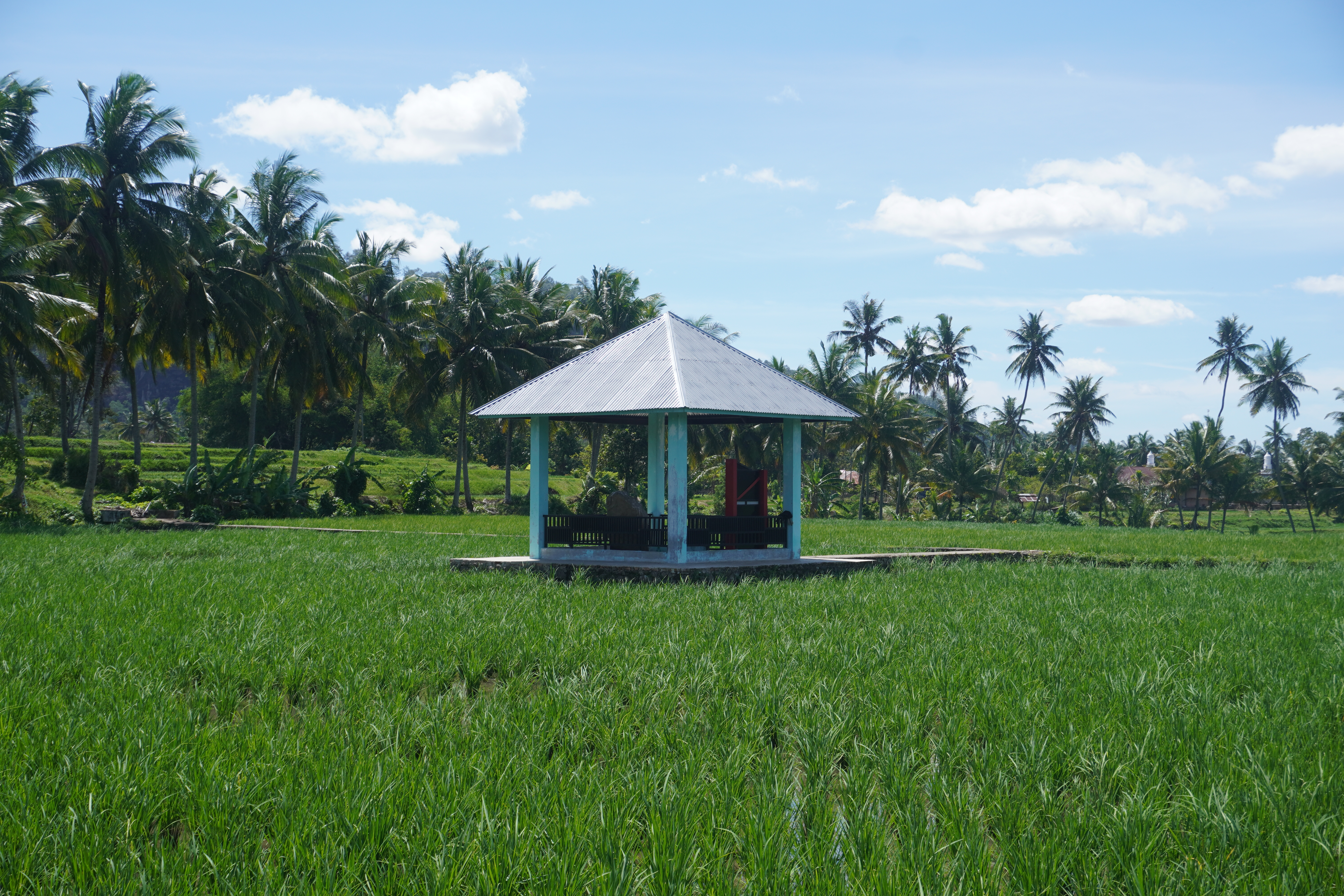
The Ponggongan inscription is located in the middle of rice fields and is protected by a fence and a roof.

This inscription was first reported by Nicolaas Johannes Krom, an epigraphist and archaeologist, in Oudheidkundig Verslag (or Archaeological Report), published by the Bataviaasch Genootschap van Kusten en Wetenschappen (the Royal Batavian Society of Arts and Sciences) in 1912. The archaeological inventory data was primarily compiled by Louis Constant Westenenk, the Dutch Assistant Resident assigned to Fort de Kock (now Bukittinggi).

The Ponggongan inscription is believed to have been discovered in an irrigated rice field, located specifically in Ponggongan, Pagaruyung Nagari (village), Tanjung Emas District, Tanah Datar Regency, West Sumatra. Ponggongan can be reached by following the Batang Selo river upstream, just to the north of Bukit Gombak. The inscription itself is situated on a plateau, approximately 430 meters above sea level. The rice field lies within an alluvial plain with a gently sloping topography (2%). To reach the inscription's location, one must walk about 30 meters across the rice field embankment. When it was first discovered, the inscription was submerged in the field's water, but it has since been relocated onto a platform and is now protected by a traditional dome (measuring 6.2 m x 6.3 m, or 39.06 m²) with an iron fence surrounding it.

The inscription is one of five cataloged by Krom in his inventory at Ponggongan. The others are referred to as the Pagaruyung V inscription, the Pagaruyung VIII inscription (also known as Ponggongan II), the Pagaruyung IX inscription, and the Pagaruyung X inscription. The Pagaruyung V and Pagaruyung VIII inscriptions are currently housed in the Adityawarman Inscription Complex, while the Pagaruyung IX inscription is kept in the Collection Room of the Batusangkar Archaeological Heritage Conservation Center.

The word ponggongan in the local language literally means "burning" or "firing places." Nearby, an ancient goldsmith workshop site was uncovered during excavations led by Budi Istiawan in 2010–2011. The site is estimated to date from the 16th or 17th century, and the use of fire at this location likely accounts for the name of the area.

== Physical description ==
Two stone inscriptions were found in the Ponggongan rice field. One of them, known as the Ponggongan inscription, has fourteen lines of eroded inscription, according to Krom. The other stone, located nearby, has no inscription.

This inscription is made of tuff, a common material for inscriptions during the reign of King Adityawarman. The dimensions of the inscription are 150 cm high, 90 cm wide, and 30 cm thick. The flat, but heavily weathered, stone inscription has a slight elevation on the upper right side. The severe damage and abrasion to the surface of the inscription are the result of weathering and time, as well as the fragile nature of the stone, which makes the inscription difficult to read. To date, no in-depth study has been conducted to interpret the inscription's contents due to its severe damage.

== Significance ==
The inscription was found at a site associated with the reign of Adityawarman and is often listed among inscriptions thought to have been issued by Adityawarman. However, due to the worn condition of the inscription which does not allow for reading, no information can yet be drawn from the contents of the inscription. Its location in the Ponggongan rice field, supported by the discovery of an ancient goldsmith's workshop at the site, indicates that the area was part of a center of economic and craft activity at that time. This inscription, along with other inscriptions from the same period found scattered throughout Tanah Datar Regency (such as in Pariangan, Rambatan, Bukit Gombak, Gudam, Saruaso, and Ombilin,) strengthens the evidence that Adityawarman's domain was not centered on a single location (the capital), but rather formed a vast territory encompassing several regions with a widespread network of economic and ritual activities.

Adityawarman, a prince of Malay and Javanese descent, was a newcomer to the Minangkabau highlands, and he ruled the region as king for approximately forty years. Therefore, the existence of these inscriptions is thought to not only serves as a physical marker (landmark), but can also be seen as part of Adityawarman's political strategy to legitimize his authority over the established local community of Tanah Datar, which controlled economic resources, and was rich in natural resources such as agriculture and gold. The existence of this inscription indicates the complexity of the social structure under his rule, which was based on rice paddies, trade, and crafts, as well as efforts to integrate them into his commodity distribution monopoly network. Goods from the interior were sent by land to ports on the west coast, or by boat via the Kampar and Batang Hari rivers to ports on the east coast, and vice versa.

== Preservation ==
This inscription is an asset belonging to the Datuk Bunsu clan, managed under the supervision of the Regional Cultural Preservation Center III (formerly the West Sumatra Cultural Heritage Preservation Center). (Note: The kinship groups of the Minangkabau ethnic community are called kaum (or suku). Each nagari (village) in Minangkabau is formed by at least four kaum. A kaum is led by a penghulu (or datuk). In this case, the Ponggongan inscription is located within the customary territory of the kaum of Datuk Bunsu and is recognized as an asset of that kaum by the government.) This inscription has been officially recognized as a National Cultural Heritage Object. The cultural heritage status was determined through Decree (SK) Number PM.05/PW.007/MKP/2010, issued on January 8, 2010, by the Ministry of Culture and Tourism of the Republic of Indonesia.

== Gallery ==
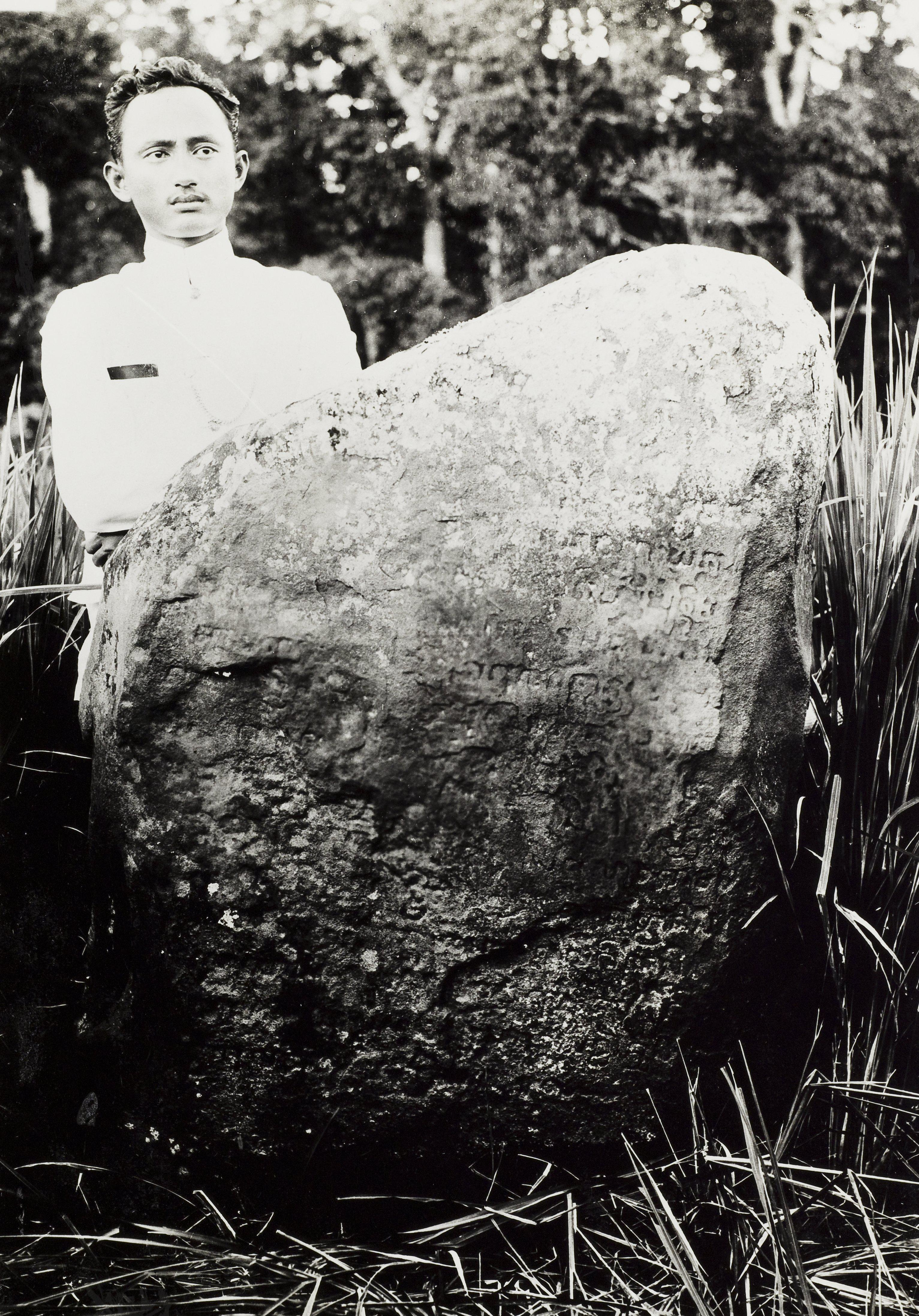
Ponggongan inscription (photograph from the collection of KITLV, c. 1890)

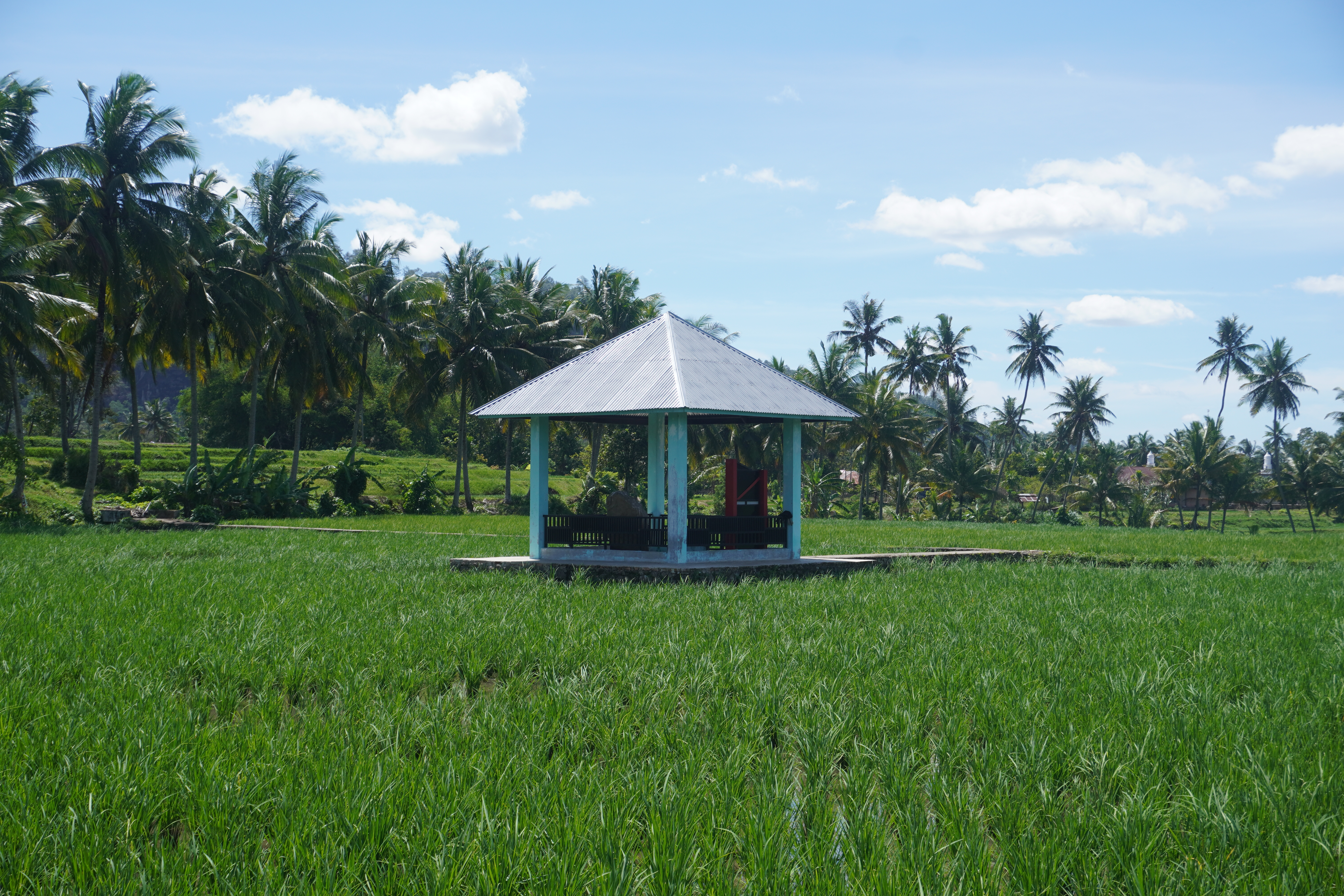
Discovery site of the Ponggongan inscription, in the middle of rice fields. It is now covered with a cungkup (inscription shelter)

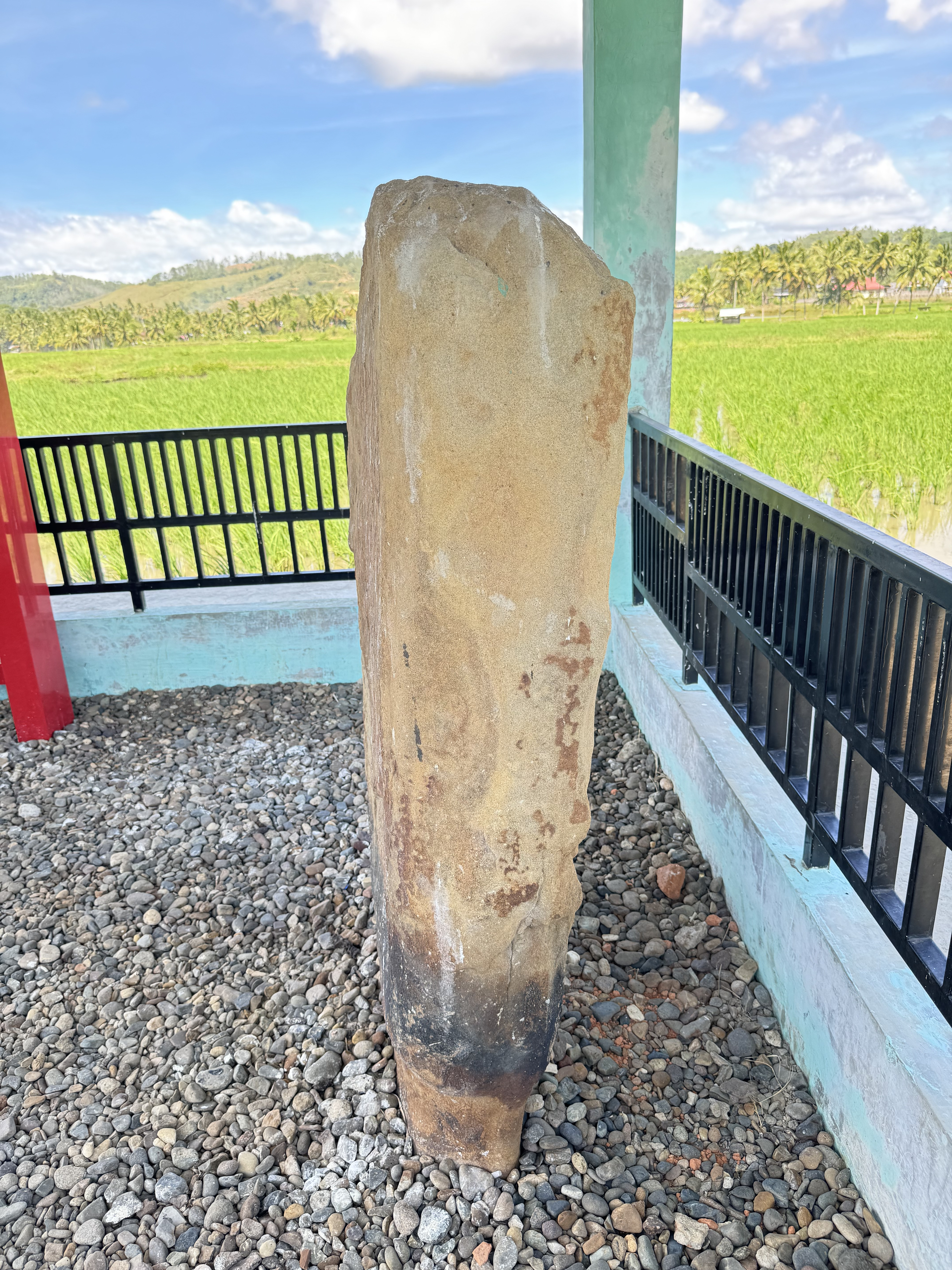
Ponggongan inscription, side view

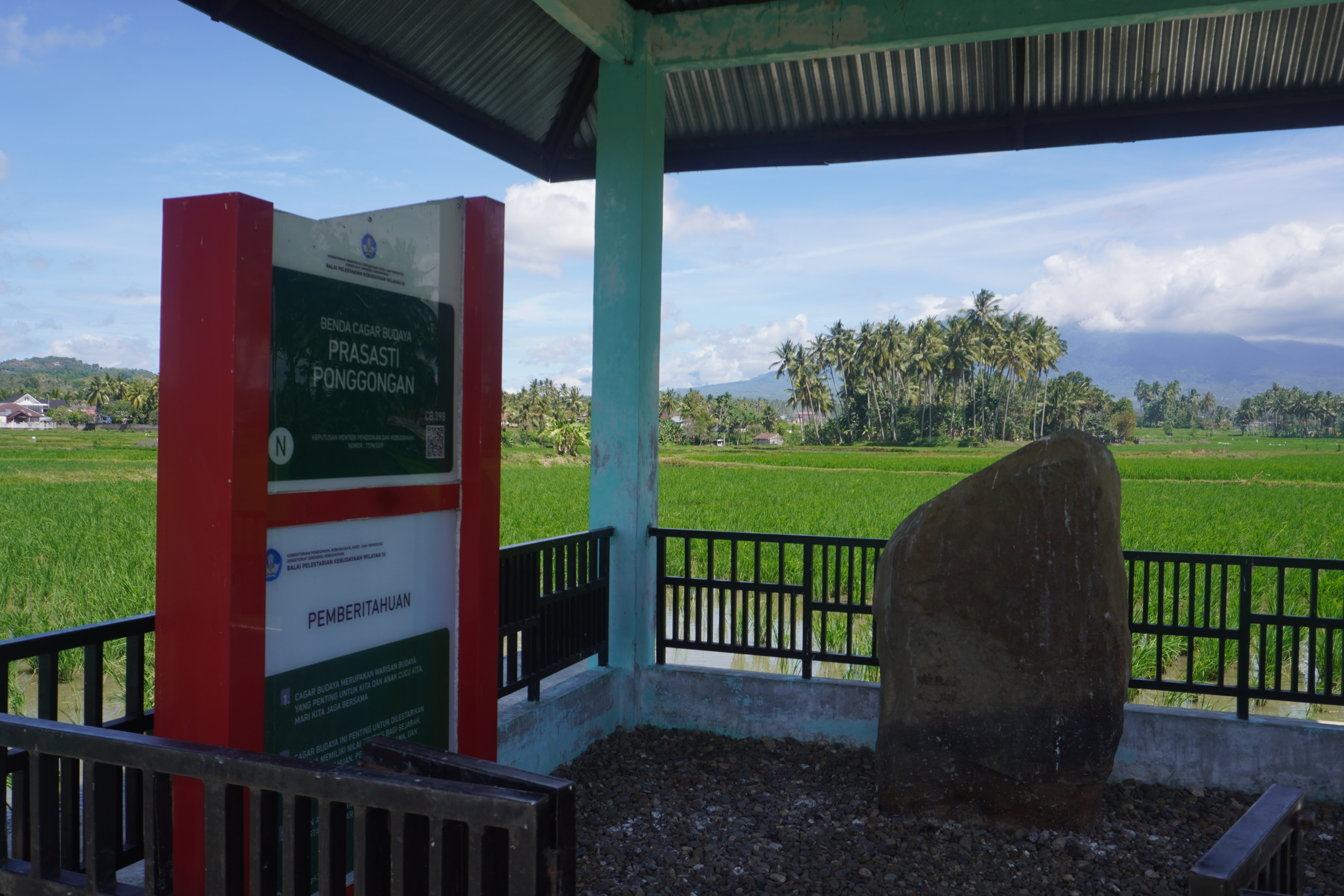
The inscription and its explanatory plaque under the shelter

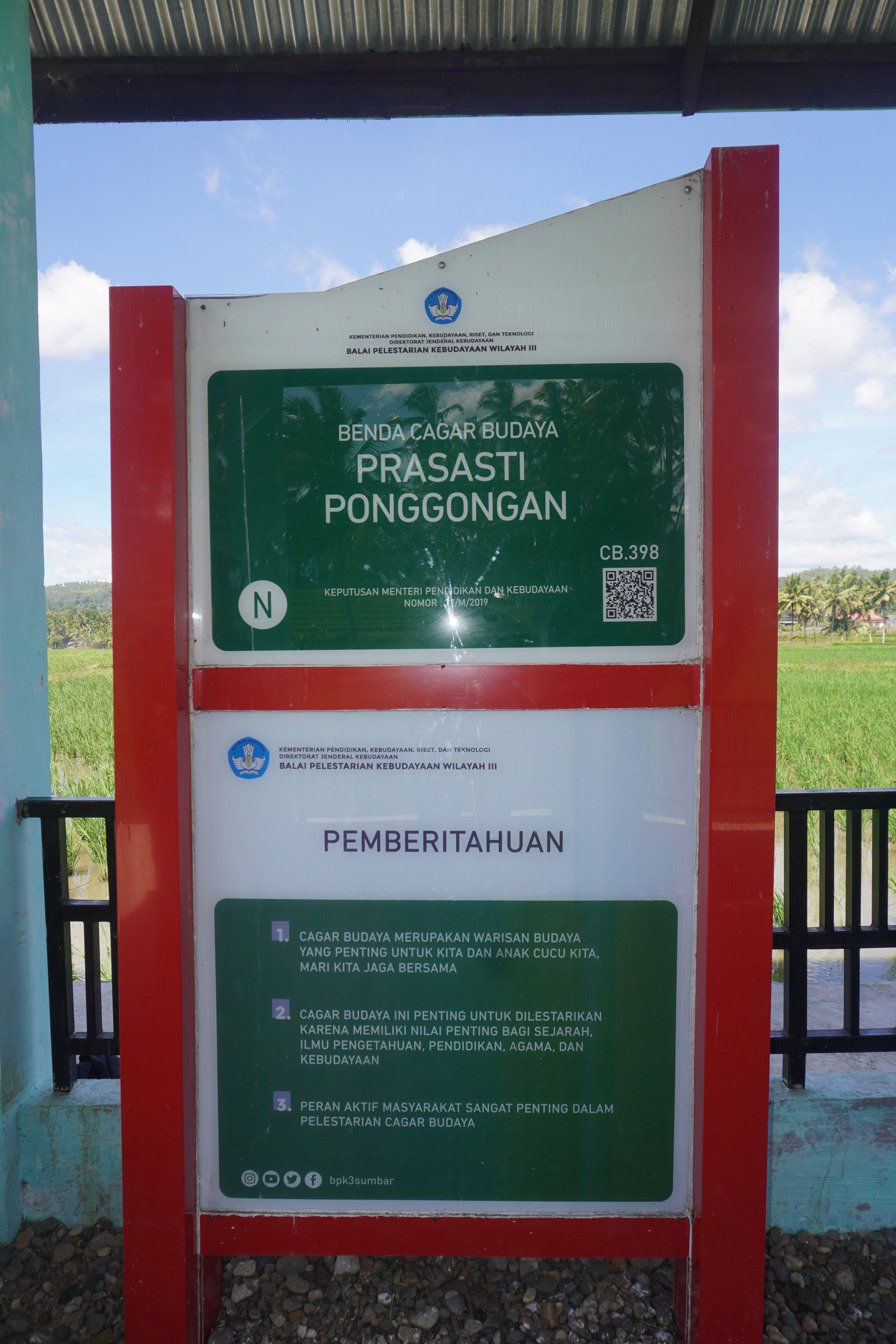
Plaque of the Ponggongan inscription as a Cultural Heritage Object, front view

== See also ==
- Dharmasraya
- Melayu Kingdom
- Pagaruyung kingdom
