= Pagaruyung IV inscription =

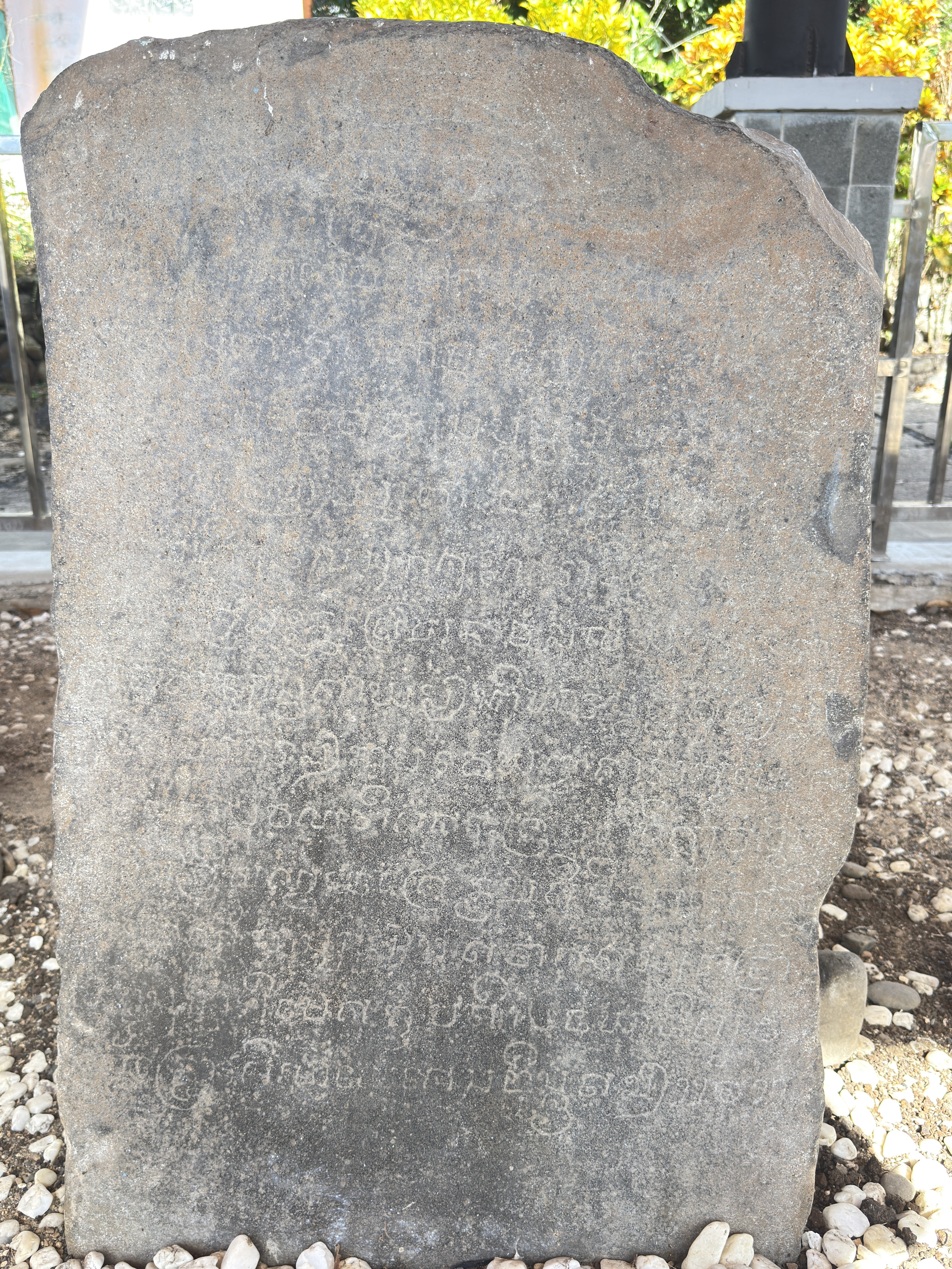
- Pagaruyung IV inscription
- Type: Stone inscription
- Material: Andesite
- Writing: Post-Pallava script
- Created: 14th century CE
- Discovered: Gudam, Pagaruyung, Tanah Datar Regency, West Sumatra
- Present location: Adityawarman Inscription Complex
- Language: Sanskrit
- Culture: Dharmāśraya Malay/Minangkabau

Location
- Pagaruyung IV inscription (Sumatra) Paguruyung IV location

Pagaruyung IV inscription, also known as Gudam I inscription, is one of the inscriptions from the reign of King Adityawarman discovered in the Gudam area, Pagaruyung Village, Tanjung Emas District, Tanah Datar Regency, West Sumatra, Indonesia. This inscription was carved on an andesite stone measuring 100 cm in height, 66 cm in width, and 15 cm in thickness, and decorated with an ornament of a bhoota kala head with its tongue sticking out in the middle of its mouth.

The language used in this inscription is Sanskrit, written using the Post-Pallava script. There are thirteen lines of writing, but the beginning is difficult to read due to erosion, while the lower part is more clearly legible.

Currently, the Pagaruyung IV inscription is kept in the Adityawarman Inscription Complex along with several other inscriptions. This inscription has been registered as a cultural heritage object with inventory registration number 26/BCB-TB/SMB.

== Background ==
The Pagaruyung IV inscription was discovered in the Gudam area, Pagaruyung Village, Tanjung Emas District, Tanah Datar Regency, West Sumatra. During the Dutch colonial period, this inscription was reported, among others, by epigraphist N.J. Krom in the Oudheidkundig Verslag (Archaeological Report) of 1912. The information in that report was largely compiled based on archaeological inventory data collected by L.C. Westenenk, Dutch Assistant Resident at Fort de Kock (now Bukittinggi City).

This inscription was later moved from its original discovery site and is now kept in the Adityawarman Inscription Complex, Pagaruyung, alongside seven other inscriptions from around Pagaruyung and several artifacts. At the site, this inscription has been registered as a cultural heritage object with inventory number 26/BCB-TB/SMB.

The Pagaruyung IV inscription is one of the important evidence of the formation of the political and religious identity of pre-Islamic classical Minangkabau. This is reflected in the form of syncretism with Indian influence, through the use of Sanskrit language and Post-Pallava script.

== Description ==
The Pagaruyung IV inscription was carved on a dark gray andesite stone in a rectangular shape with a relatively flat surface. The inscription measures 100 cm in height, 66 cm in width, and 15 cm in thickness, and remains in good and intact condition. At the top of the inscription is a stylized carving of a bhoota kala head, depicted with a tongue protruding from the middle of its mouth.

There are 13 lines of writing in Sanskrit using the Post-Pallava script, though the condition is generally worn. In the first through eighth lines, the characters are quite eroded and therefore very difficult to read. From the ninth line onward, the writing is relatively clearer, although overall the interpretation of the content or a complete translation has not yet been firmly established.

=== Content ===
Istiawan (2006) made an initial attempt at reading and noted that most of the inscription is already difficult to decipher, making its interpretation unclear. However, from the parts still legible, the word Adityawarman appears on the thirteenth line, and the place name Sarawasa on the ninth line. A quite similar form, Surawasawan, is also found in the Saruaso I inscription. He argued that, if the reading is correct, the place name likely refers to the location where the royal palace once stood.

A more recent attempt was made by Arlo Griffiths (unpublished), producing a much more complete transcription, as cited in Kusumadewi (2012). According to Griffiths, the readable content of the inscription is as follows:

".... on the day, .... and in the Śaka year .... the power of seven golden lands .... a king on earth, Udayadityawarman with his values of virtue.

The great Maitreyanatha, comparable to one who stands in a vihara/religious dwelling yet sheltered in the city, in the perfection of Malayapura, .... the great king among kings, Adityawarman, the wise king of the world ...., gives the name of the city.. that is perfect, when the sun among kings rules in Sriladana (sandalwood, land/city). in the full month of Karttika.

The king’s epithet, standing well on an atom (?) of the jewel of the Tathagata, King Udayadityawarman, [gives the command to obtain] the country in Sanskrit on a stone decree."

=== Ornament ===
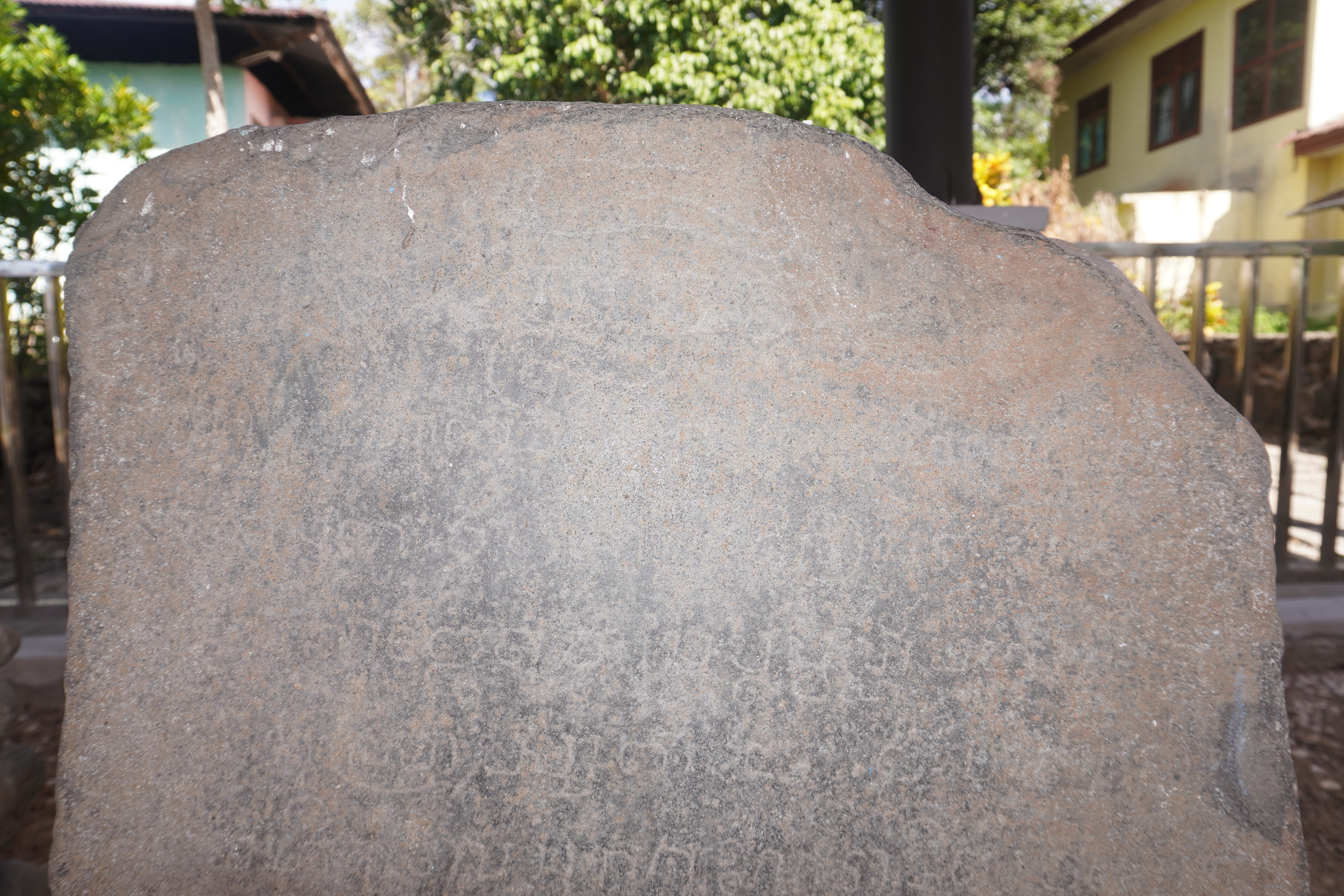
Stylized kala head ornament with tongue protruding at the top of the inscription

The upper part of this inscription contains a stylized kala head ornament with a tongue protruding from the middle of its mouth. Chandra (2016) suggested that this motif may be related to the Buddhist Tantrism tradition adhered to by Adityawarman. The ornament is not directly connected to the content of the inscription. Several other inscriptions of Adityawarman also feature similar ornaments, though the content of each inscription differs.

Pratiwi et al. (2021) argued that the kala head symbol was chosen as a protective emblem for the stone inscription, as well as a reminder that those who commit evil will suffer misfortune like the kala itself.

Witasari (2011) suggested that the ornament was a special identity chosen by Adityawarman to demonstrate his presence. The symbol was used by the king as a marker and unifier of his realm. Its absence from all of Adityawarman’s inscriptions indicates that the sign held special meaning and was not merely decorative.

== Interpretation ==
The Pagaruyung IV inscription is thought to contain an official statement affirming the authority and power of King Adityawarman over the Pagaruyung region, as well as his role in safeguarding the religious teachings practiced at that time. Adityawarman’s authority as a king is demonstrated through the mention of his title, namely Maharajadiraja Srīmat Srī Udayādityawarma Pratāpaparākrama Rājendra Maulimāli Warmadewa in the Amoghapasa inscription issued in 1347. Meanwhile, in the Pagaruyung IV inscription, he asserted that his power encompassed the "seven golden lands"—a designation for the island of Sumatra (Swarnnadwipa or Swarnnabhumi)—as a claim over the vast territory under his rule.

The mention of the word Sarawasa is also significant, as historical studies suggest that in his later years Adityawarman concentrated his power in Saruaso Village, now part of Tanah Datar Regency, West Sumatra. It was here that the king spent the remainder of his life and prepared his son, Ananggawarman, as his successor. In the geopolitical context of the 14th-century Nusantara, Adityawarman’s position in the interior of Sumatra was highly strategic for restoring Malay power, which had previously declined and come under pressure from Palembang, Siam, and Java.

The existence of the Pagaruyung IV inscription cannot be separated from the broader historical context of Adityawarman’s kingdom. It marks the peak of cultural and political integration in the highlands of West Sumatra during the pre-Islamic period and serves as important evidence of the process of forming local political identity. The inscription also reflects the development of Hindu-Buddhist traditions in the Minangkabau interior before the arrival of Islamic influence in the early 16th century, as recorded in the Suma Oriental (1512–1515) by the Portuguese explorer Tomé Pires.

== Significance and preservation ==
This inscription holds important value in demonstrating the geographical and administrative presence of Adityawarman’s strong rule in Minangkabau (West Sumatra) and the Malay world in the mid-14th century. The inscription also forms part of the cultural heritage that strengthens historical awareness and regional identity, as well as serving as an educational medium for society. The inscription has been registered as part of the National Cultural Heritage at the Adityawarman Inscription Complex, through Decree Number 77/M/2019, issued on 12 March 2019 by the Ministry of Education and Culture of the Republic of Indonesia. Physical protection efforts such as monitoring the level of stone weathering and cleaning the surface of the inscription from moss and dirt have been part of basic conservation activities at the complex, carried out by caretakers of inscriptions from the Cultural Heritage Preservation Center Region III West Sumatra.

== See also ==
- Melayu Kingdom
- Pagaruyung Kingdom

== Reference ==
=== Bibliography ===
- Chandra, Dodi (2019). Lambang Raja Adityawarman (1347-1374 M): Sebuah Deskripsi Awal [Sign of King Adityawarman (1347-1374 AD): A Preliminary Description] (in Indonesian). Balai Pelestarian Cagar Budaya Sumatera Barat.
- Istiawan, Budi (2006). Selintas Prasasti dari Melayu Kuno [A Glimpse of Ancient Malay Inscriptions] (PDF) (in Indonesian) (1 ed.). Balai Pelestarian Peninggalan Purbakala Batusangkar (Wilayah Kerja Provinsi Sumatera Barat dan Riau).
- Nastiti, Titi Surti (2015). Inskripsi Nusantara: Kajian Epigrafi Melayu Kuno [Archipelagic Inscriptions: A Study of Old Malay Epigraphy] (in Indonesian). Jakarta: Pusat Arkeologi Nasional. ISBN 978-979-99057-8-9.
- Kozok, Uli (2015). A 14th Century Malay Code of Laws: The Nitisarasamuccaya. Institute of Southeast Asian Studies. ISBN 9789814459747.
- Krom, Nicolaas Johannes (1912). "Inventaris de Oudheden in de Padangsche Bovenlanden" [Inventory of the antiquities in the Padang Highlands]. Oudheidkundig verslag (in Dutch). 49. Bataviaasch Genootschap van Kunsten en Wetenschappen. Weltevreden: Albrecht & Co.: 33–50.
- Kusumadewi, Sri Ambarwati (2012). Adityawarman (1347-1374 Masehi): Kajian Epigrafi [Adityawarman (1347-1374 AD): Epigraphic Study] (in Indonesian). Fakultas Ilmu Pengetahuan Budaya Universitas Indonesia. p. 28.
- Pratiwi, Eka; Sunliensyar, Hafiful Hadi; Adi, Ari Mukti Wardoyo Adi (2024). "Legitimasi Kekuasaan Ādityawarman di Kerajaan Malayu Berdasarkan Sumber-Sumber Prasasti" [The Legitimacy of Ādityawarman’s Sovereignty in Malayu Kingdom Based on the Inscriptions]. Berkala Arkeologi. 44 (2). doi:10.55981/jba.2024.6852. ISSN 2548-7132.
- Setiawan, Taufiqurrahman; Susilowati, Nenggih; Hidayati, Dyah; Soedewo, Ery; Oetomo, Repelita Wahyu; Chandra, Dody; Nasoichah, Churmatin; Koestoro, Lucas Partanda (2016). Sumatera Barat: Catatan sejarah dan arkeologi [West Sumatra: Historical and archaeological notes] (in Indonesian). Medan: Balai Arkeologi Sumatera Utara. ISBN 978-979-751-682-6.
- Witasari, Vernika Hapri (2011). Lambang Raja pada Kerajaan Kuna di Kawasan Indonesia Abad XI- XV Masehi: Suatu Rekonstruksi Makna [Royal Symbols of Ancient Kingdoms in the Indonesian Region in the 11th-15th Centuries AD: A Reconstruction of Meaning] (PDF) (in Indonesian). Fakultas Ilmu Pengetahuan Budaya Universitas Indonesia.
