= Umbul Temple =

Hindu temple in Java, Indonesia

Coordinates: 7°21′35.86″S 110°17′52.15″E

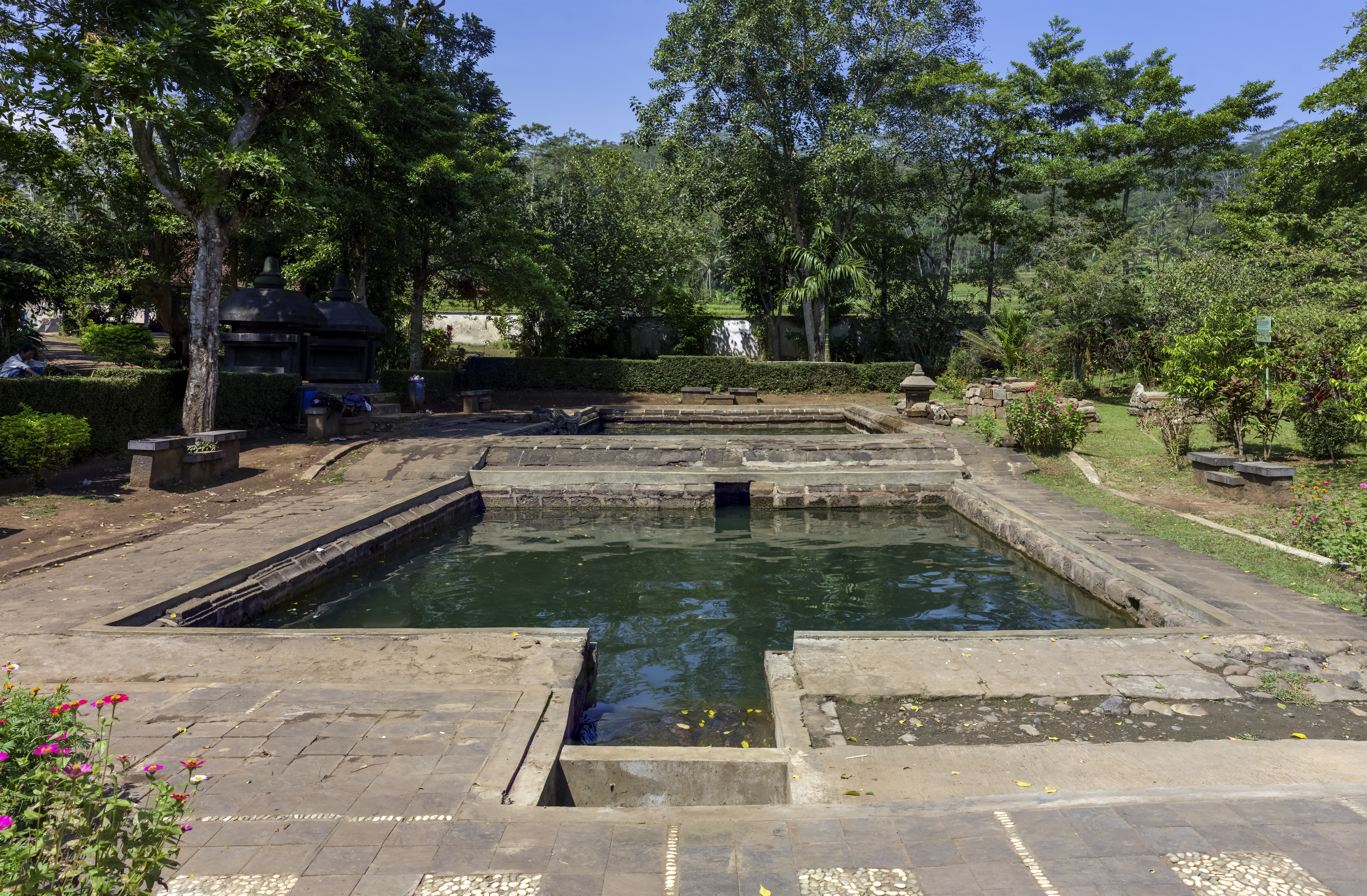
A bathing area at Umbul Temple

Umbul Temple (Indonesian: Candi Umbul) is a Mataram-era Hindu temple in Kartoharjo, Grabag, Magelang, Central Java, Indonesia. It consists of numerous stones around two bathing pools which derive their water from a spring. Thought to have been built in the 9th century as a bathing and resting place for the King of Mataram, it was abandoned in the early 11th century but rediscovered by the 19th century. The temple complex, considered a Cultural Property of Indonesia, is open to tourists – including bathers and pilgrims.

== Description ==
The Umbul temple complex has two rectangular bathing areas, a larger upper pool (measuring 7.15 by 12.5 metres (23.5 by 41.0 ft)) and a smaller lower pool (measuring 7 by 8.5 metres (23 by 28 ft)). The warm, green-tinted water, which is derived from a spring, flows from the large pool into the smaller one through a 2-metre (6 ft 7 in) long water duct.

Around the pools is a garden, as well as various stones, including some in the shape of lingga and yoni. In 1876, the Dutch scholar R.H.T. Friederich proposed that there may have been two temples at the site, although no bases have been discovered. His proposal of two temples is supported by similarities in the carving of the stones and reliefs, suggesting that they were not part of the same temple. An original wall lies some 20 metres (66 ft) east of the bathing pool.

Various artefacts have been found at Umbul, including religious sculptures. Statues found include two of Ganesha, two of Durga, and one of Agastya. In a 1923 inventory, N.J. Krom wrote that a garuda with a human body had been found as well.

== Location and history ==
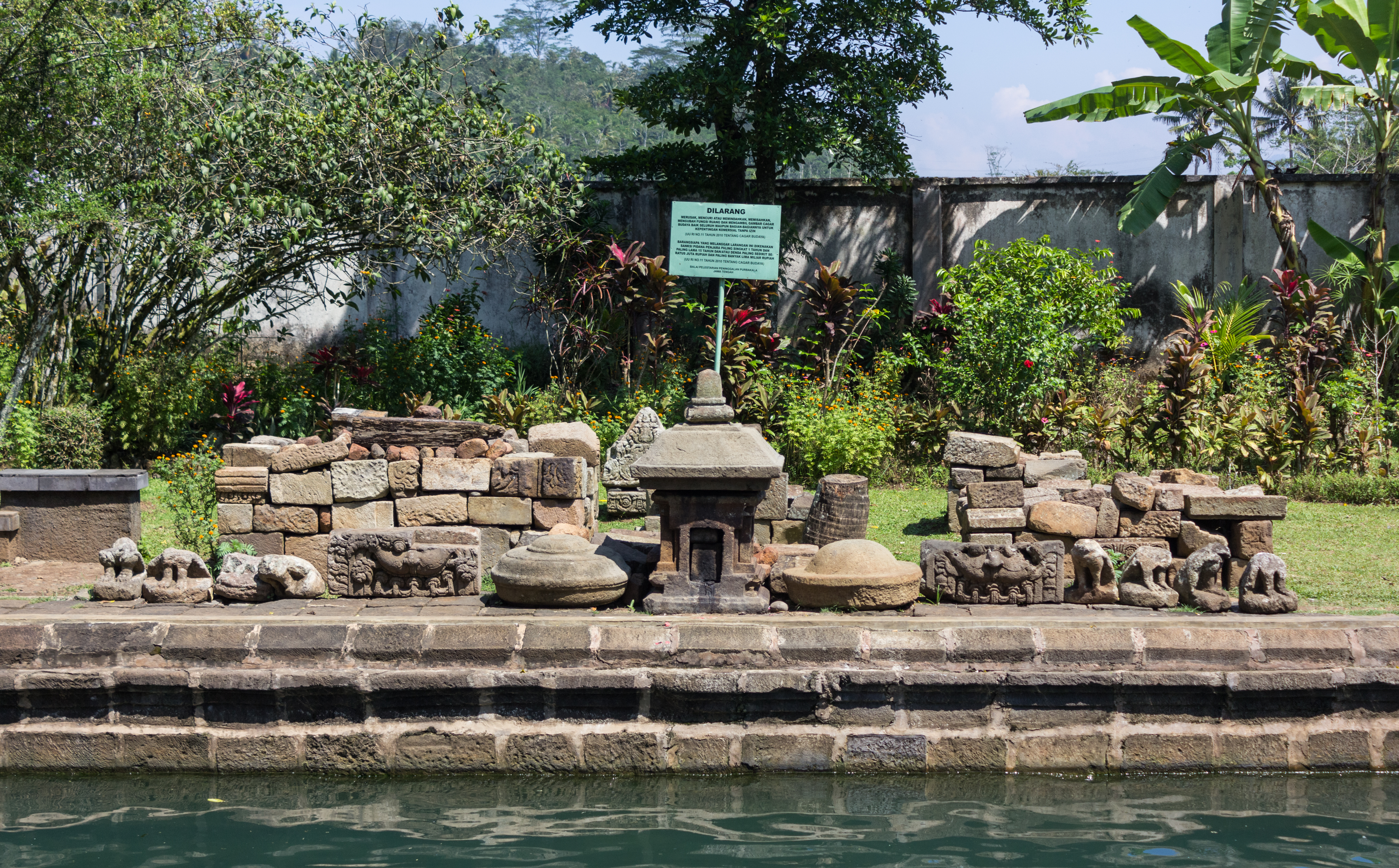
Stones at the temple

Umbul is located in Kartoharjo, Grabag, Magelang, Central Java, Indonesia, at the bottom of a valley and surrounded by hills, approximately 550 metres (1,800 ft) above sea level. It is one of eleven temples in the area around the Elo River; Umbul is 50 metres (160 ft) south of the waterway. Umbul is one of several water-related attractions in the area, which is also home to Sekar Langit waterfall and Telaga Bleder. The temple is known by several names, including Air Panas and Candi Panas, and its waters are believed to cure skin diseases.

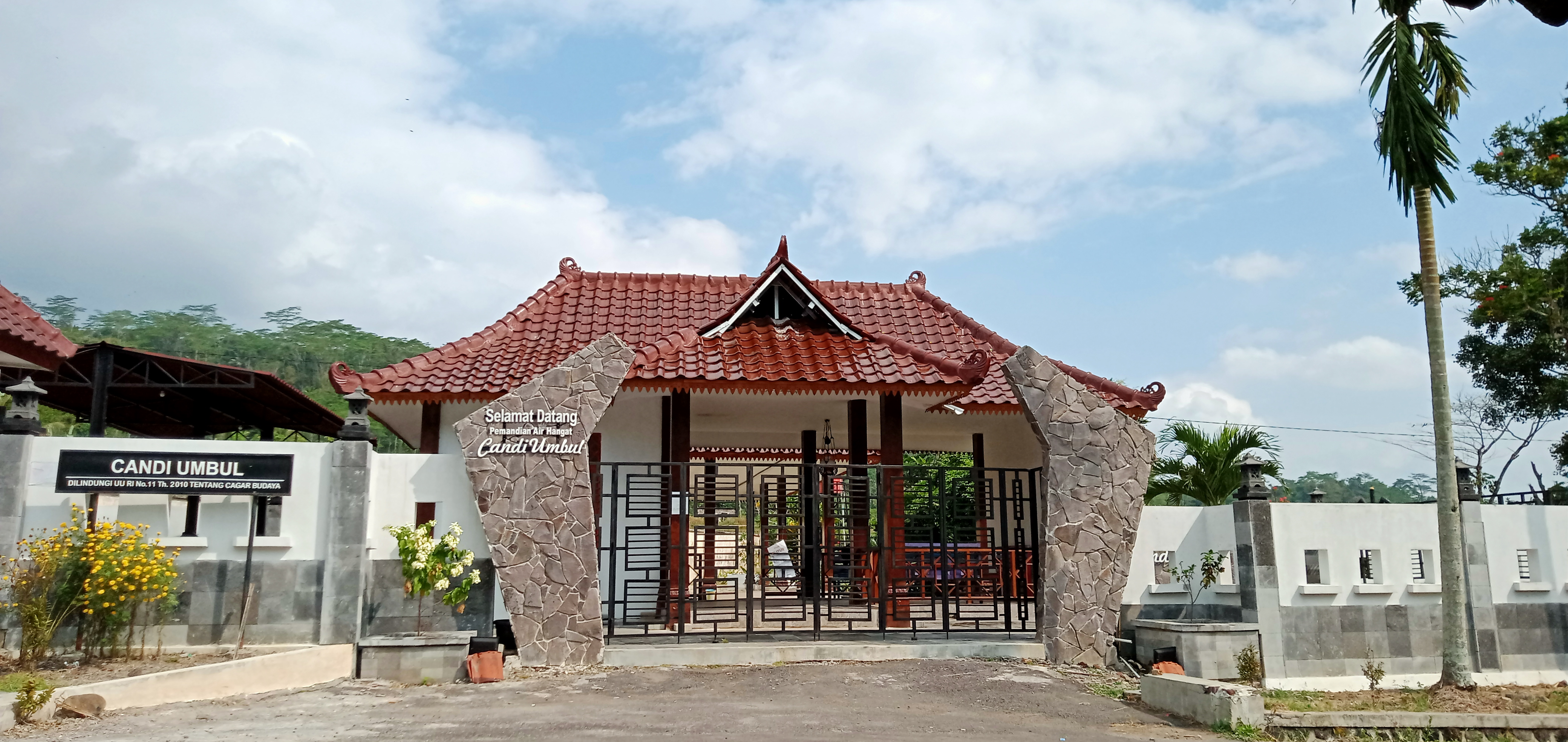
New appearance of Umbul Temple

The exact year of the temple's construction is not certain, though it is thought to have been constructed in the 9th century, perhaps between 800 and 890, predating the better-known Borobudur. It is thought to have been a resting and bathing area for the Hindu Mataram-era kings, as well as serving as a site of worship. It is one of only four confirmed pools from the era, the others being Sidomukti near Semarang, Cabean Kunti in Boyolali, and Payak in the Special Region of Yogyakarta. Umbul was likely abandoned following the 1006 eruption of Mount Merapi, which covered the area in ash, and a flood not long afterward. Although the year of rediscovery is not recorded, the temple has been known since at least the 19th century, and Dutch coins from the 1700s have been found in the area.

Umbul is open as a tourist attraction. Tribun Jogja reports that, as of June 2014, it receives an average of 30 visitors a day; some come to bathe, others to relax, and others for pilgrimage. Entrance tickets are Rp. 3,300 for adults and 2,300 for children. The growth potential is limited by the narrow streets leading to the temple from the main road. The complex is considered a Cultural Property of Indonesia.

== See also ==
- Candi of Indonesia

== Works cited ==
- Degroot, Véronique (2009). Candi, Space and Landscape: A Study on the Distribution, Orientation and Spatial Organization of Central Javanese Temple Remains. Leiden: Sidestone Press. ISBN 978-90-8890-039-6.
- Jauhary, Rafiq (20 September 2013). "Magelang Ternyata Punya Air Terjun & Pemandian Air Hangat" [So Magelang Has Waterfalls and Hot Springs]. Detik (in Indonesian). Archived from the original on 10 September 2014.
- "Menikmati Sore di Pemandian Air Hangat Candi Umbul" [Enjoying an Evening at the Warm Springs of Candi Umbul]. Tribun Jogja (in Indonesian). 2 June 2014. Archived from the original on 3 June 2014.
- Sugeng Widodo; Sudarno; Damiri; Sunarno; Sutriyono (2001). "Penelitian Arkeologi Situs Candi Umbul: Candi Umbul Kartoharjo Grabag Magelang" [Archeological Research of the Umbul Temple Site: Umbul Temple, Kartoharjo, Grabag, Magelang] (in Indonesian). Body for the Preservation of Borobudur Temple. Archived from the original on 7 July 2014.
