= Sanskrit inscriptions in Maritime Southeast Asia =

Indian script in Southeast Asia

A good number of inscriptions written in Sanskrit language have been found in maritime Southeast Asia, notably in Malaysia and Indonesia. "Early inscriptions written in Indian languages and scripts abound in Southeast Asia. [...] The fact that southern Indian languages didn't travel eastwards along with the script further suggests that the main carriers of ideas from the southeast coast of India to the east - and the main users in Southeast Asia of religious texts written in Sanskrit and Pali - were Southeast Asians themselves. The spread of these north Indian sacred languages thus provides no specific evidence for any movements of South Asian individuals or groups to Southeast Asia.

== Notable inscriptions ==
=== Kutai inscriptions ===
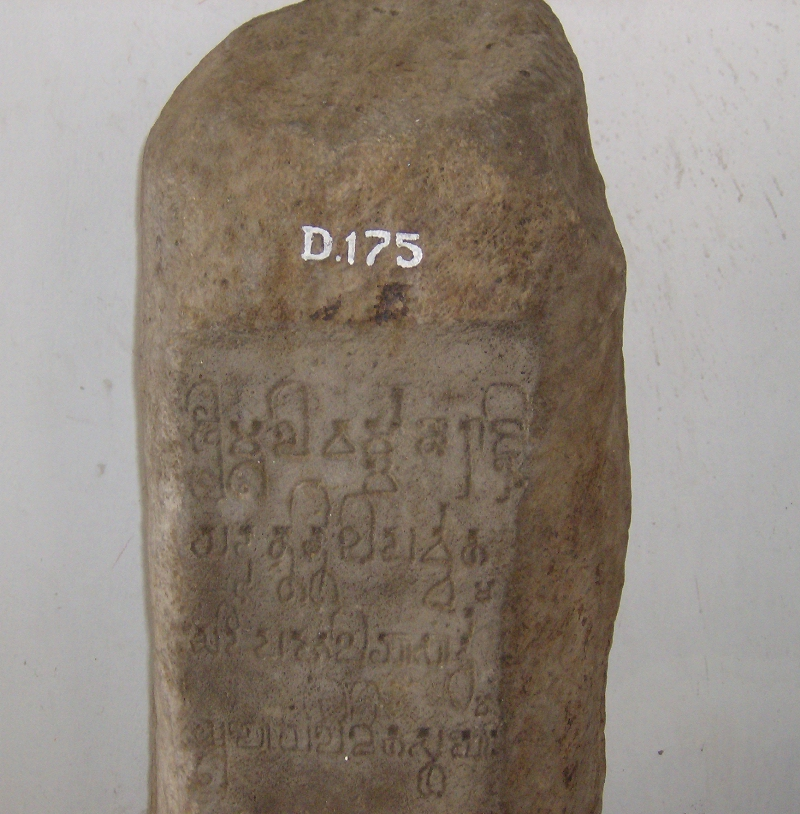
Picture of one of the Kutai inscriptions at the National Museum in Jakarta

The oldest known inscriptions in Indonesia are the Kutai inscriptions, or the Muarakaman inscriptions, which are those on seven stone pillars, or yupa (“sacrificial posts”), found in the eastern part of Borneo, in the area of Kutai, East Kalimantan province. They are written in the early Pallava script, in the Sanskrit language, and commemorate sacrifices held by a king called Mulavarman. Based on palaeographical grounds, they have been dated to the second half of the 4th century AD. They attest to the emergence of an Indianized state in the Indonesian archipelago prior to AD 400, and hence Old Kutai Kingdom (Kutai Kuno) is the earliest known Indianized polity in Indonesia.

In addition to Mulavarman, the reigning king, the inscriptions mention the names of his father Asvavarman and his grandfather Kundungga. It is generally agreed that Kundungga is not a Sanskrit name, but one of native origin. The fact that his son Asvavarman is the first of the line to bear a Sanskrit name indicates that he was probably also the first to adhere to Hinduism.

=== Tugu Inscription ===
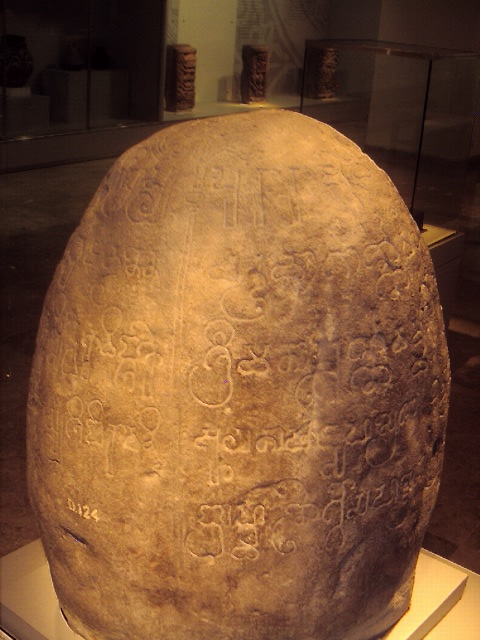
Tugu inscription in National Museum of Indonesia

The Tugu inscription is one several inscriptions associated to Tarumanagara, discovered in Batutumbuh hamlet, Tugu village, Koja, North Jakarta, in Indonesia. The inscription contains information about hydraulic projects; the irrigation and water drainage project of the Chandrabhaga river by the order of a certain Rajadirajaguru, and also the water project of the Gomati river by the order of King Purnawarman in the 22nd year of his reign. The digging project to straighten and widen the river was conducted in order to avoid flooding in the wet season, and as an irrigation project during the dry season.

The Tugu inscription was written in Pallava script arranged in the form of Sanskrit Sloka with Anustubh metrum, consisting of five lines that run around the surface of the stone. Just like other inscriptions from the Tarumanagara kingdom, the Tugu inscriptions do not mention the date of the edict. The date of the inscriptions was estimated and analyzed according to paleographic study which concluded that the inscriptions originated from the mid 5th century. The script of the Tugu inscription and the Cidanghyang inscription bear striking similarity, such as the script "citralaikha" written as "citralekha", leading to the assumption that the writer of these inscriptions was the same person.

The Tugu inscription is the longest Tarumanagara inscription pronounced by edict of Sri Maharaja Purnawarman. The inscription was made during the 22nd year of his reign, to commemorate the completion of the canals of the Gomati and Candrabhaga rivers. On the inscription there is an image of a staff crowned with Trisula straight to mark the separation between the beginning and the end of each sentence.

=== Kedah Inscription ===
An inscription in Sanskrit dated 1086 has been found in Kedah. This was left by Kulothunga Chola I (of the Chola empire. This too shows the commercial contacts the Chola Empire had with Malaysia.

=== Ligor Inscription ===
An inscription was found in the Malay Peninsula in Southern Thailand, at Nakhon Si Thammarat. It has been dubbed the Ligor inscription, being the name given by Europeans to the region in the 16th and 17th centuries. It is written in Sanskrit and bears the date of 775 AD. One side of the inscription refers to the Illustrious Great Monarch (śrīmahārāja) belonging to the "Lord of the Mountain" dynasty (śailendravaṁśa), which is also mentioned in four Sanskrit inscriptions from Central Java; the other side refers to the founding of several Buddhist sanctuaries by a king of Srivijaya. Srivijaya is the name of a kingdom whose centre was located in the modern city of Palembang in South Sumatra province, Indonesia. The Ligor inscription is testimony to an expansion of Sriwijaya power to the peninsula. The Ligor inscription has been known in the list of inscription of Thailand as "Inscription No. 23 : Inscription of Wat Sema Mueang" which has been found at Wat Sema Mueang, Wiang Sak township, Mueang district of Nakhon Srithammarat in 1907 by Prince Damrongrachaniphab when he was Ministry of Interior during the annual inspection trip with the era recorded in the inscription as "Maha Sakkarat 697" (AD 775) The Ligor inscription is testimony to an expansion of Sriwijaya power to the peninsula.

== List of Sanskrit inscriptions throughout the Southeast Asia archipelago ==
This table lists only inscriptions that are entirely written in Sanskrit or have extensive portions of Sanskrit within them (e.g. a whole side of a stone or lengthy epithets).

Inscriptions	Place of discovery	Date	Note
Võ Cạnh inscription	Nha Trang, Vietnam	2nd-3rd century CE	The oldest known Sanskrit inscription in Southeast Asia
Muarakaman inscriptions	East Kalimantan, Indonesia	~ 400 CE	Also known as Kutai inscriptions
Kebon Kopi I inscription	Bogor, Indonesia	~ 400 CE	Also known as Tapak Gajah inscriptions
Tugu inscription	North Jakarta, Indonesia	early 5th century CE	
Cidanghiang inscription	Pandeglang, Indonesia	5th century CE	Also known as Lebak inscription
Ciaruteun inscription	Bogor, Indonesia	5th century CE	
Muara Cianten inscription	Bogor, Indonesia	5th century CE	
Jambu inscription	Bogor, Indonesia	5th century CE	
Pasir Awi inscription	Bogor, Indonesia	5th century CE	
Tukmas inscription	Magelang, Indonesia	6th-7th century CE	
Canggal inscription	Magelang, Indonesia	732 CE	Earliest mention of King Sanjaya
Kanjuruhan inscription	Malang, Indonesia	750 CE	Also known as the Dinoyo inscription
Hampran inscription	Salatiga, Indonesia	760 CE	Also known as the Plumpungan inscription
Ligor inscription	Nakhon Si Thammarat, Thailand	775 CE	
Kalasan inscription	Sleman, Indonesia	778 CE	
Kelurak inscription	Klaten, Indonesia	782 CE	
Karangtengah inscriptions	Temanggung, Indonesia	824 CE	Also known as Kayumwungan inscription
Tri Tepusan inscription	Temanggung, Indonesia	842 CE	
Belanjong pillar	Sanur, Denpasar, Indonesia	914 CE	One side of the stone is in Sanskrit, while the other is in Old Balinese
Pucangan inscription	Mojokerto, Indonesia	1041 CE	Also known as the Calcutta Stone. One side of the stone is in Sanskrit, while the other is in Old Javanese
Wurare Inscription	Mojokerto, Indonesia	1289 CE	
Pasir Panjang inscription	Karimun, Indonesia	9-12th century CE	
Singapore Stone	Singapore	10-11th century CE	Language unclear due to severe damage to the stone; either Sanskrit, Old Javanese or Old Malay
Akarendra inscription	Tanah Datar, Indonesia	12th century CE	
Manjusri inscription	Malang, Indonesia	1343 CE	
Amoghapasa inscription	Dharmasraya, Indonesia	1347 CE	
Pagaruyung III inscription	Tanah Datar, Indonesia	1347 CE	
Bukit Gombak inscription	Tanah Datar, Indonesia	1357 CE	
Pagaruyung VIII inscription	Tanah Datar, Indonesia	1369 or 1316 CE	
Suruaso I inscription	Tanah Datar, Indonesia	1375 CE	
Suruaso II inscription	Batusangkar, Indonesia	14th century CE	Also known as Batusangkar inscription
Kuburajo inscription	Tanah Datar, Indonesia	14th century CE	
Waringin Pitu inscription	Trenggalek, Indonesia	1447 CE	Predominantly in Old Javanese, but mentioning members of the Majapahit royal family with long epithets in Sanskrit verse

== See also ==
- Tamil inscriptions in the Malay world
- Symbolic usage of Sanskrit
- Indianisation
- Sanskritisation
- Indosphere
- Greater India
