= Pagaruyung VIII inscription =

- Ponggongan II inscription
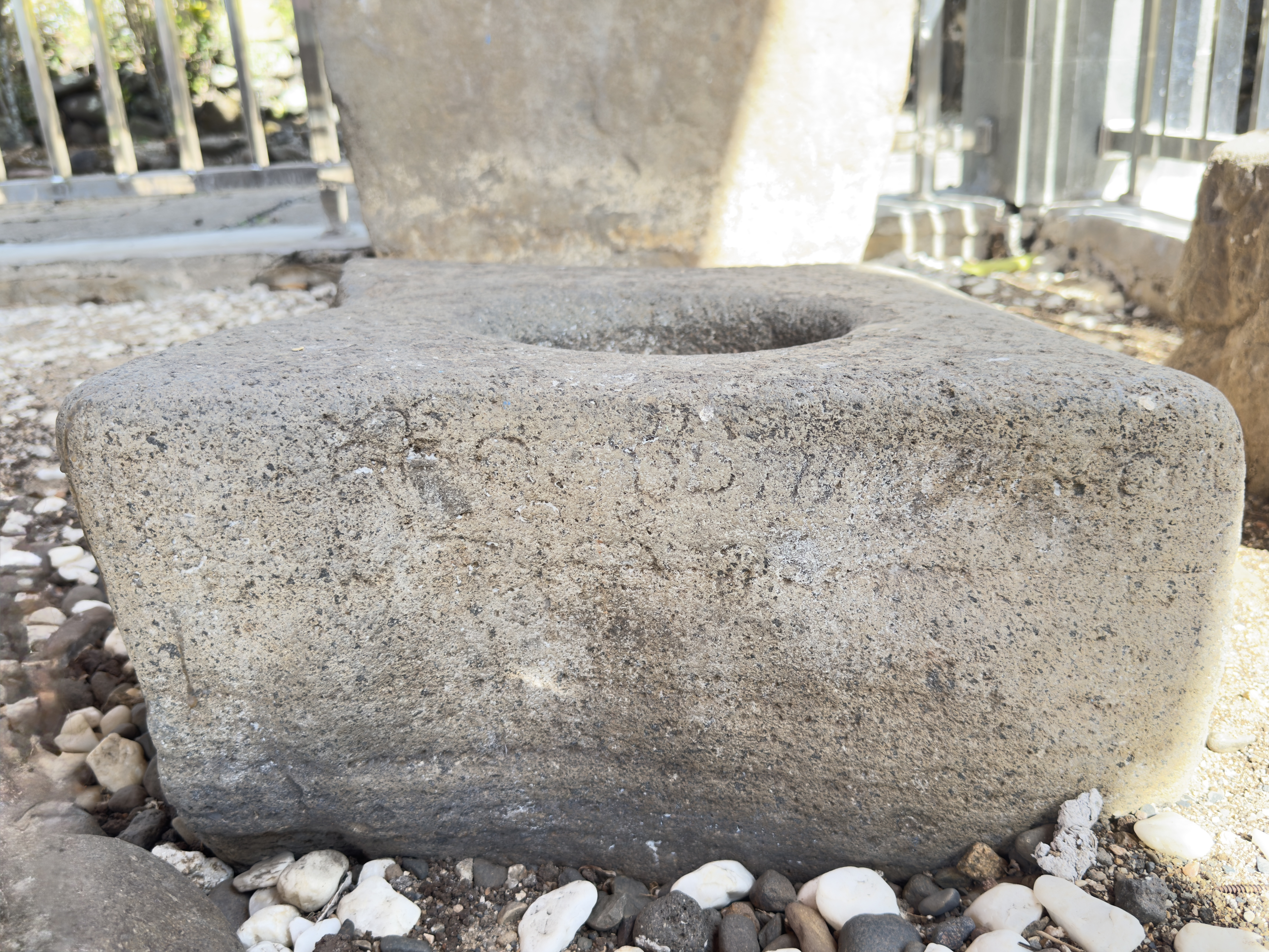
- Type: Stone inscription
- Material: Lapilli stone
- Length: 52 cm
- Height: 30 cm
- Width: 49 cm
- Writing: Post-Pallava Sumatran script
- Period/culture: Malayapura Kingdom
- Place: Ponggongan, Tanah Datar, West Sumatra, Indonesia
- Present location: Adityawarman Inscription Complex
- Coordinates: 0.4597310°S 100.6077240°E
- Registration: No SK : 77/M/2019 Decree Date: 2019-03-12
- Language: Sanskrit, Old Javanese
- Culture: Pagaruyung Culture

Location
- Pagaruyung VIII inscription (Sumatra) Location of Paguruyung VIII

Pagaruyung VIII inscription, also known as Ponggongan II inscription, is an inscription dating to the reign of King Adityawarman, bearing the year 1291 Saka or 1369 CE. This inscription is written on a rectangular stone mortar, made of whitish-brown lapilli stone, featuring a central hole that functioned as a place for pounding rice. The text is written in Sanskrit, slightly mixed with Old Javanese using the Post-Pallava Sumatran script, and is distributed across three sides of the stone’s surface.

The content of the inscription includes praises for a king, described as generous, orderly, and depicted as the incarnation of a semi-divine being (gana). The chronogram ratu ganato hadadi inscribed on the stone was interpreted by Budi Istiawan as indicating the year 1368 CE; while de Casparis read it as the year 1238 Saka (1316 CE) and associated it with King Akarendrawarman, presumably a predecessor and maternal uncle (Minangkabau: mamak) of Adityawarman.

In addition to its historical value, the Pagaruyung VIII inscription, together with other inscriptions in the Adityawarman Inscription Complex, has served as an educational tool for the community, particularly in introducing local culture to the younger generation. This inscription was registered as a National Cultural Heritage object through Decree (SK) Number 77/M/2019, issued on March 12, 2019, by the Ministry of Education and Culture of the Republic of Indonesia.

== Historical overview ==
The Pagaruyung VIII inscription dates to the reign of King Adityawarman, originating from approximately the 13th to 14th centuries CE. It was first reported by epigrapher and archaeologist N.J. Krom in the Oudheidkundig Verslag (Archaeological Report) published by the Bataviaasch Genootschap van Kusten en Wetenschappen (Batavian Society of Arts and Sciences) in 1912. It is recorded as one of five inscriptions discovered in the Ponggongan area, Balai Janggo jorong (sub-village), Pagaruyung Nagari (village), Tanjung Emas District, Tanah Datar Regency, West Sumatra, Indonesia.

Krom noted that the inscription stone is square-shaped with a hole in the center. He observed that there is a single line of text on each side, with the first line continuing onto the second line on the first side. According to his observations, the inscription was dated to the year 1?17, with the hundred digit being unclear. He also wrote that the inscription had, by that time, been moved from its discovery location to Pagaruyung, where it was designated as the Pagaruyung VIII inscription.

Historians generally associate this inscription with the reign of King Adityawarman, a ruler known for leaving behind numerous inscriptions written in Sanskrit, Old Malay, Old Javanese, and even Tamil. The content—a eulogy for a king likened to a deity—is not debated; however, there are differences of opinion regarding the dating and the identity of the figure mentioned in the inscription. Some researchers interpret its origin as the time of Adityawarman, while others link it to the period of Akarendrawarman.

== Location ==
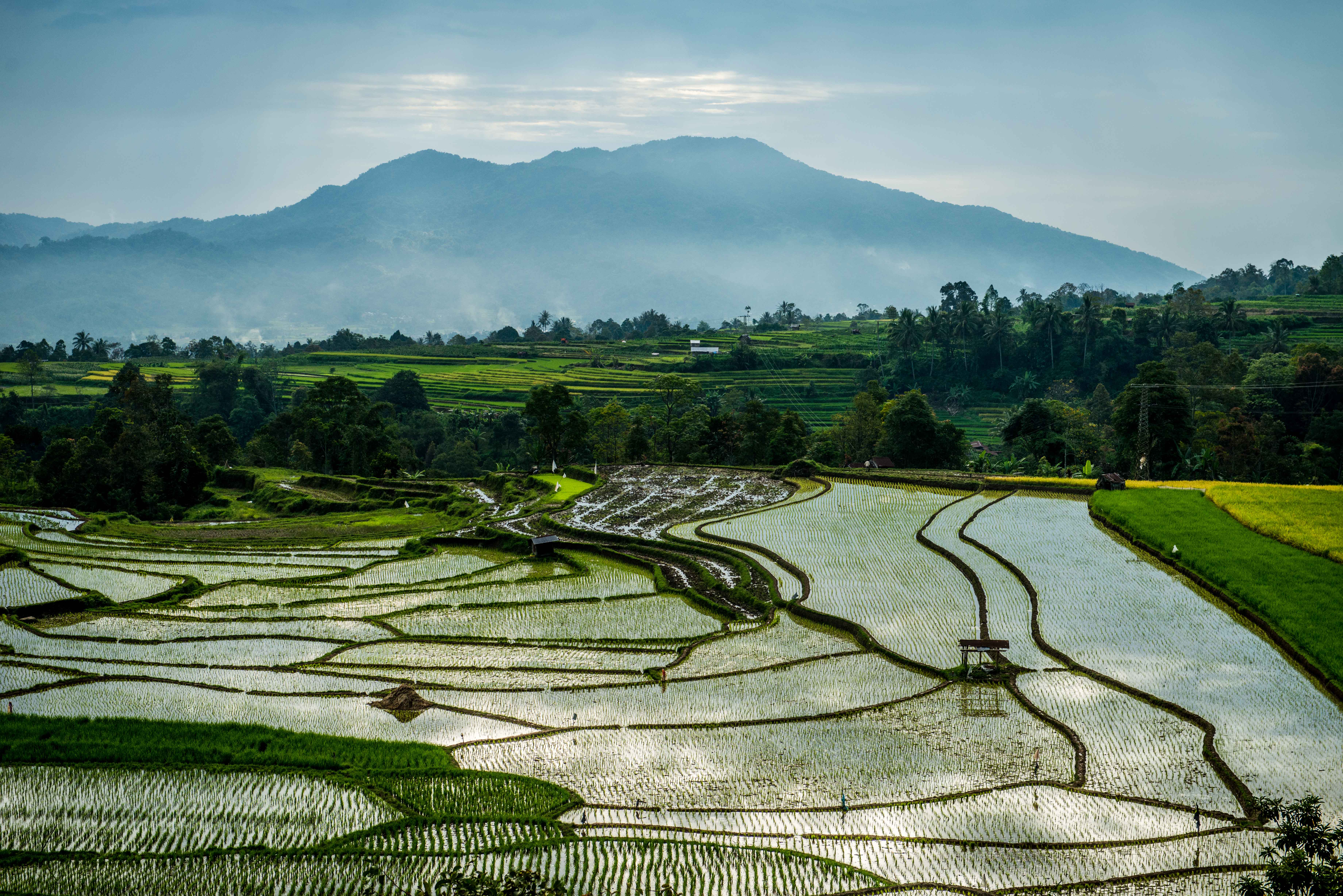
Tanah Datar Regency is where the Pagaruyung VIII Inscription was found

Currently, the Pagaruyung VIII Inscription has been collected along with seven other inscriptions at the Adityawarman Inscription Complex located on the Pagaruyung-Batusangkar highway in Gudam, Nagari Pagaruyung, Tanjung Emas District, Tanah Datar Regency. The maintenance of this inscription is carried out by the West Sumatra Cultural Heritage Preservation Center, and this artifact has been registered as a cultural heritage object with inventory number 26/BCB-TB/SMB.

== Description ==
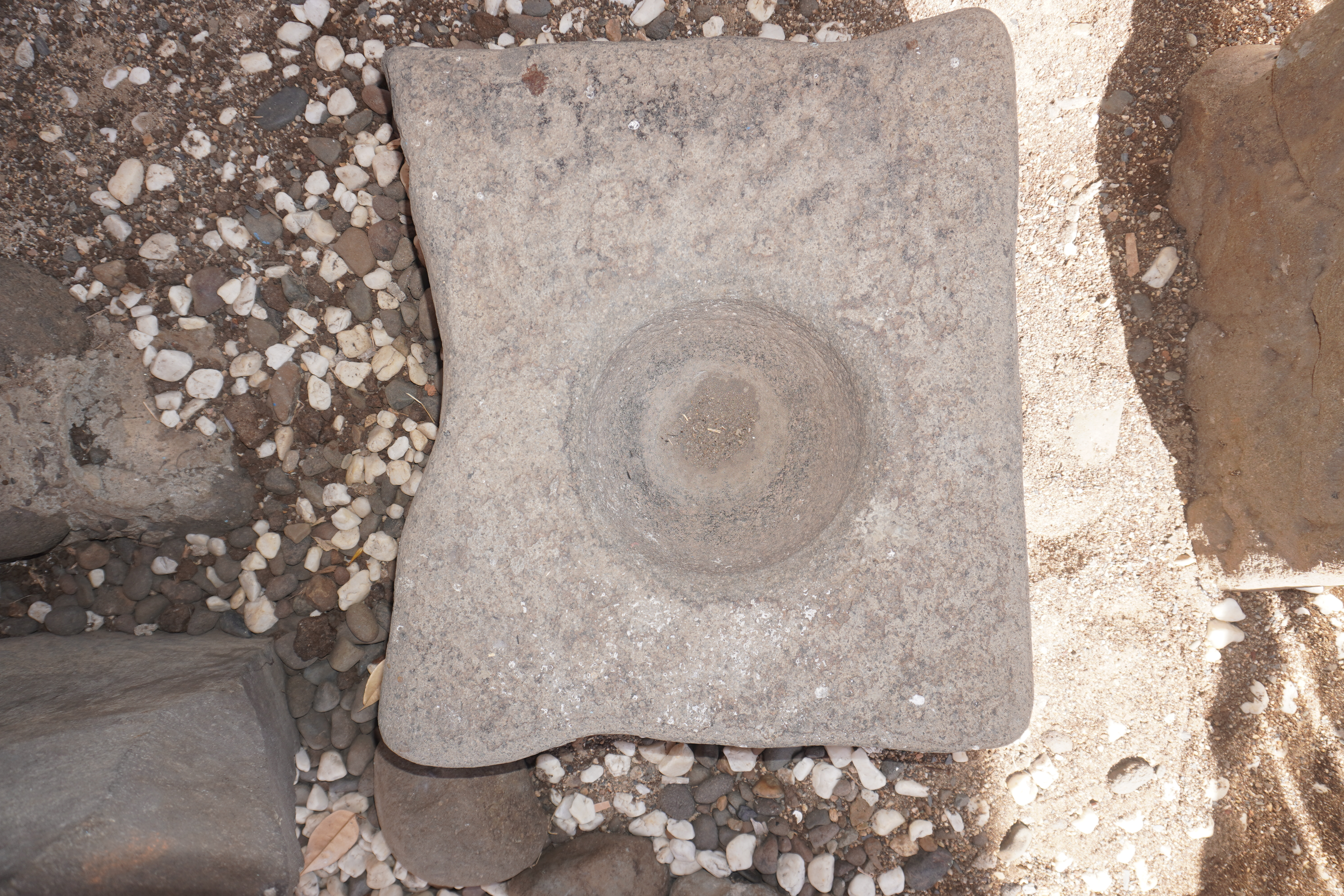
Pagaruyung VIII inscription, top view

This inscription is carved on an artifact in the form of an asymmetrical rectangular stone mortar, with the mortar hole in the center. This artifact is made of brownish-white lapilli stone. This stone mortar artifact measures 52 cm long, 49 cm wide, and 30 cm thick.

The Pagaruyung VIII inscription is written in Sanskrit with a little Old Javanese, using the Sumatran Post-Pallava script. This inscription contains one line of inscription, which is carved around the body of the mortar on three sides. The first line is a long sentence and the second line is a short sentence. The inscription begins on one side with two lines of text, continues on the second and third sides, and ends on the first side with a second line. According to de Casparis, the fourth side does not have an inscription because it was probably attached to a building or rock.

=== Transcription ===
According to Budi Istiawan (2006), the transliteration of this inscription is as follows:

1. Om. tithiwarsatitha ratu ganato hadadi jestamasa dwidasa drta dana satata lagu nrpo kanaka jana amara wasita wasa
2. sukhasthita //o//

Previously, J.G. de Casparis (1989) had also done a quite different transcription, as follows:

Sasikarawacaraturagankite
a----ddhana------ya/
sriy=akarendra-nrpo kanakawaneh
amarawasitawasa sukham sthita//

=== Translation ===
According to Budi Istiawan (2006), the translation of this inscription is as follows:

1. Happy. In the year Saka 1291, month of Jyesta, date 12 (there was) a king who was always generous with gold and was an example like a god who (smelled) fragrant
2. orderly and always happy

Kusumadewi (2012) observed that in previous readings of the Pagaruyung VIII inscription, there were errors in the punctuation of the sentences. These errors generally took the form of the omission of several punctuation marks, such as the diacritic under ṇ, ṭ, ṣ, ṁ, ḍ, ḥ , and the tilde on top of ñ. According to her, these punctuation mistakes could have come from the citralekha (inscription writer) or from previous researchers who failed to include them. The inaccurate use of punctuation marks has the potential to undermine the accuracy of reading the characters in question, as well as the accompanying saṁdhi (phonetic changes between words). (Note: Saṁdhi is a phonetic change in a sentence, whereby each word that follows the preceding or following word undergoes a change in sound or spelling.)

== Interpretation ==
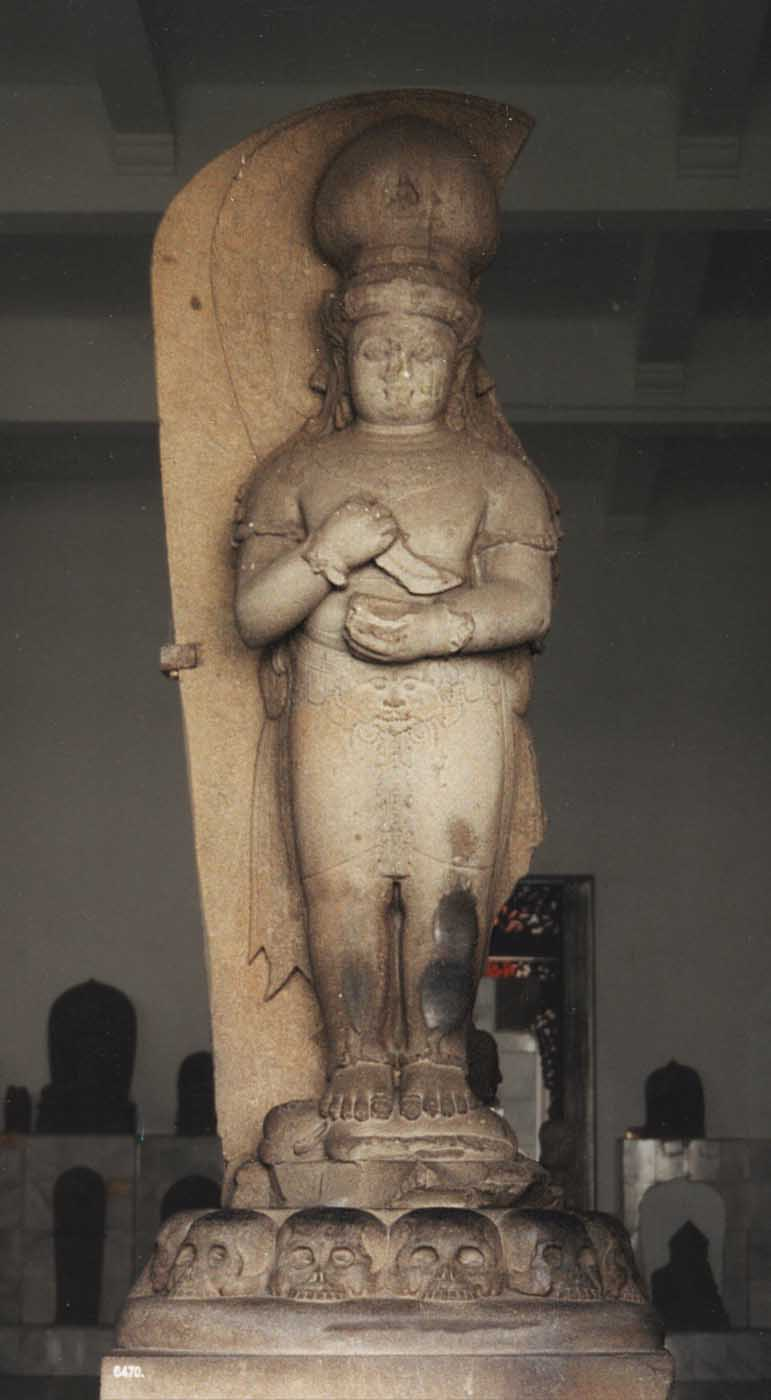
Adityawarman, the king associated with the Pagaruyung VIII inscription

This inscription contains a date in the form of a chronogram (candra sengkala) which Istiawan read as ratu ganato hadadi, with ratu or king (equal to 1), gana or demigod (equal to 2), and hadadi or incarnation (equal to 12), which results in the year 1291 Saka or 1369 CE, and is considered to originate from the time of Adityawarman (reigned between 1347–1375 CE). The text praises the king as a generous, disciplined figure who was seen as the embodiment of a god.

However, de Casparis interpreted the candra sengkala differently, with sasi or moon (equal to 1), kara or hand (equal to 2), awacara or environment (equal to 3), and turangga or horse (equal to 8), which results in the year 1238 Saka or 1316 CE. Therefore, according to him, this inscription is an evidence of the reign of King Akarendrawarman, and based on his analysis of the kinship system in Minangkabau, it is possible that this king was a maternal uncle (Minangkabau: mamak) of Adityawarman. In addition, Adwayawarman—who is mentioned in the Kuburajo I inscription as the father of Adityawarman—is not recorded as ever having been king in West Sumatra.

=== Function of stone mortars ===
This inscription is unique because it is carved on an artifact in the form of a mortar or stone mortar. Miksic (1987) notes that stone mortars are traditional tools that have long been used to pound rice or other foodstuffs, and are commonly found in both old and new villages in West Sumatra. According to the local community, some stone mortars that are no longer in use previously played a role in traditional ceremonies or other ceremonial activities.

In Balubus, stone mortars are used in harvest ceremonies, where the first sheaf of rice is cut and then pounded, accompanied by chants and offerings. In Manganti, Guguk, on the banks of the Sinamar River, stone mortars are used to collect the blood of sacrificial animals, whose meat is eaten after a communal river cleaning event. The blood of sacrificial animals, such as sheep, is collected and possibly left to dry to honor the spirits of the ancestors. In Bukit Afar, mortars are used to mark boundaries between tribes.

Miksic also noted that in the past, all indigenous people had stone mortars, while later arrivals were not allowed to have them. In other locations, the houses of chiefs were marked by the possession of at least four stone mortars. Evidence shows that stone mortars continued to be used until almost the modern era. Their location changed according to their owners or the relocation of settlements. Unlike other prehistoric artifacts such as menhirs (standing stones) found on the outskirts of settlements, stone mortars were found in the middle of settlement areas.

=== Myths ===
Before being scientifically studied by historians, the local community had long been familiar with the myths surrounding the Pagaruyung VIII Inscription and other ancient stone inscriptions scattered throughout various locations in Tanah Datar Regency. These folk tales serve as a means of cultural and traditional education for the local community. To this day, these myths are still preserved in an educational context to introduce cultural heritage to the younger generation. A collection of Minangkabau folklore about ancient rock myths and folk tales from this regency was published by the West Sumatra Provincial Library and Archives Agency.

== See also ==
- Adityawarman
- Sanskrit inscriptions in Maritime Southeast Asia
