= Pagaruyung V inscription =

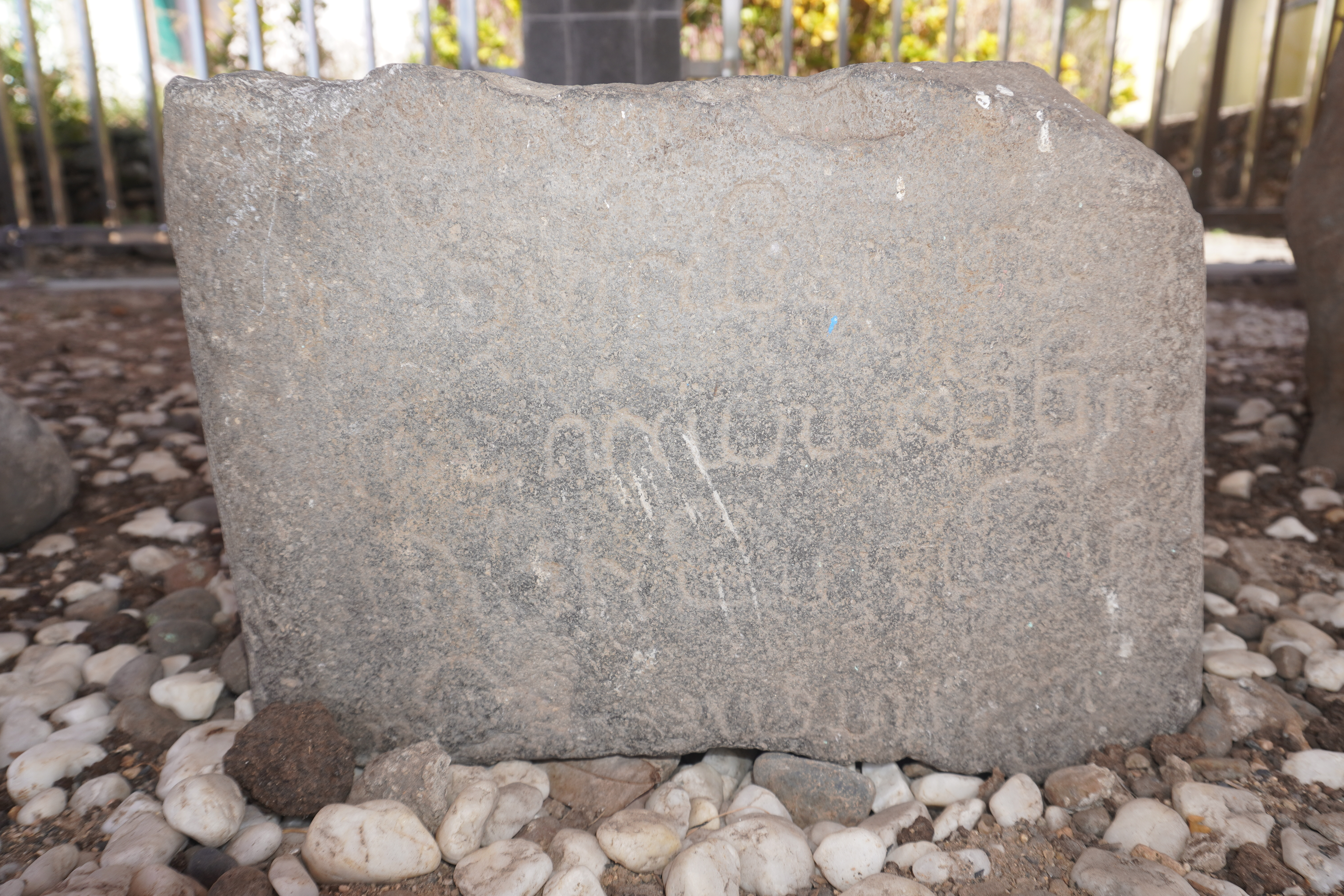
- Type: Inscription
- Material: Andesite stone
- Size: Height: 27 cm Width: 46 cm Thickness: 19.5 cm
- Writing: Post-Pallava script
- Period/culture: Reign of King Adityawarman
- Place: Pagaruyung Village, Tanjung Emas District, Tanah Datar Regency, West Sumatra
- Present location: Adityawarman Inscription Complex
- Coordinates: 0.4597310°S 100.6077240°E
- Language: Old Javanese
- Culture: Pagaruyung culture

Location
- Pagaruyung V inscription (Sumatra) Location of Paguruyung V

Pagaruyung V inscription is an inscription found in Pagaruyung, Pagaruyung Village (nagari), Tanjung Emas District, Tanah Datar Regency, in West Sumatra, Indonesia. This inscription is estimated to date from the reign of King Adityawarman, who ruled between 1347 and 1374 CE in the Malay Kingdom—the predecessor of the Pagaruyung Kingdom—which was centered in Tanah Datar Regency. The Pagaruyung V inscription was discovered as a stone fragment measuring 27 cm in height, 46 cm in width, and 19.5 cm in thickness. The inscription is written in Old Javanese using the Post-Pallava script.

The content of the inscription mentions the construction of a garden by an individual named si Satra, which featured seating for King Adityawarman. This makes the Pagaruyung V inscription unique, as it is the only remaining inscription from the Adityawarman era that records a garden and the atmosphere of palace life. The inscription also demonstrates Javanese cultural influence through the language used and the naming of figures mentioned within it.

Currently, the Pagaruyung V inscription is preserved alongside several other inscriptions and artifacts at the Adityawarman Inscription Complex in Pagaruyung, under inventory number 26/BCB-TB/SMB. The inscription has been designated as a National Cultural Heritage Object since 2019.

== Background ==
The Pagaruyung V inscription was recorded in the reports of the Dutch East Indies government, specifically in the Inventaris der Oudheden in de Padangsche Bovenlanden (Inventory of Antiquities in the Padang Highlands) compiled by N.J. Krom. The report was written based on field data collected by Assistant Resident Louis Constant Westenenk in Fort de Kock, which is now the city of Bukittinggi. In the report, Krom categorized the inscriptions found in the Tanah Datar Regency area into two types: the Adityawarman-inscripties (Adityawarman inscriptions), which are those that explicitly name King Adityawarman, and the Adityawarman-schrift (Adityawarman script), referring to inscriptions that utilize a similar writing style but do not specifically mention the king.

According to Krom, the inscription was discovered in the Ponggongan area, which during the colonial period was part of the Onderafdeeling (sub-district) of Fort van der Capellen. Subsequently, the inscription was moved to its current location at the Adityawarman Inscription Complex.

This is the only inscription that describes the construction of a garden, a feature rarely found in inscriptions from the reign of King Adityawarman. The Pagaruyung V inscription is also the sole known inscription providing an illustration of the atmosphere of life during the era of Adityawarman's kingdom.

== Description ==
The Pagaruyung V inscription is made of andesite stone measuring 27 cm in height, 46 cm in width, and 19.5 cm in thickness. The inscription consists of five lines of text written in the Post-Pallava script and the Old Javanese language. The condition of the Pagaruyung V inscription is severely damaged, such that only 50% of the text remains legible. On the fifth line of this inscription, the name Adityawarman is written.

In addition to being worn, there are fractures at the top and bottom of the stone. Based on paleographic studies, the top section does not represent the opening sentence or the beginning of an inscription. Similarly, the bottom section does not indicate the conclusion or end of an inscription. This suggests that the stone is a fragment of a much longer original inscription.

=== Transliteration ===
The following is the transliteration according to several authors:

Boechari	Kusumadewi (2012)
1. tani saha ta ---- ya smra ---- ita 2. sadya matata si Satra ---- (ta)naya-- ra 3. satwascaskaraga sapata(?) ----- wana ma-; 4. parama taratwa sahannira ma --- nara puspa 5. ---- (a)sana adityyawar(mman) ---- nata wa	1. tan☐i saha ta ...; 2. sadya matata si śatra 3. satwaśacaśkaraga sapata ...; 4. paramā taratwa sahannira m, ā ...; 5. ... (a)san☐am ādittyawar[mman ...

=== Translation ===
Based on the transliteration above, the following are translations according to several authors:

Budi Istiawan (2006) based on Boechari's transliteration	Kusumadewi (2012)
1. agricultural land / soil with...; 2. (he who) is willing to arrange (is) si Satra .... son of...; 3. beautiful mountain flowers. Oath (?)...; 4. especially (those in rows?) with it .... flowers 5. ... (seat of) Adityyawarmman ...nata	1. (agricultural) land with ...; 2. (he who) is willing to arrange (is) si Satra.... son of 3. beautiful mountain flowers. Oath ...; 4. especially (those in rows) with it ... flowers 5. seat of Adityawarmman..nata

== Interpretation ==
Budi Istiawan (2006) argues that the complete meaning of the Pagaruyung V inscription cannot yet be determined with certainty. However, based on the successful transliteration and translation of the surviving text, it can be concluded from the translated word fragments that the inscription records the construction of a garden by an individual named si Satra. The use of the honorific 'si' before the name Satra indicates that this figure likely belonged to the commoner class. Furthermore, the selection of the name Satra and the use of the 'si' particle reinforce the hypothesis of Javanese cultural influence, as this naming pattern was common in Old Javanese texts.

The Pagaruyung V inscription is the only surviving record from the reign of King Adityawarman that documents the creation of a garden. The garden is described as being adorned with flowers brought from mountainous regions and featuring a dedicated seat for Adityawarman. Given these details, it is probable that the garden was of significant size and beauty, warranting its commemoration through a stone inscription.

This inscription highlights the linguistic diversity found in the epigraphical legacy of King Adityawarman—utilizing Sanskrit, Old Malay, and Old Javanese—which appear sometimes in isolation and sometimes mixed within a single text. This diversity reflects Adityawarman's complex background: Javanese influence from Majapahit, Sanskrit as the language of the nobility and Brahmins, and Malay as the local language of Sumatra. The use of Old Javanese in this specific inscription demonstrates that Javanese cultural elements permeated the Malay cultural sphere alongside Adityawarman's rise to power, effectively bridging the traditions of Java and Sumatra.

== Preservation ==
The Pagaruyung V inscription is among the significant archaeological remains from the reign of Adityawarman in the Kingdom of Malayapura. Preservation efforts for this inscription are primarily carried out by the Cultural Heritage Preservation Office (BPK) Region III for West Sumatra, Riau, and the Riau Islands, which conducts periodic documentation, monitoring of physical conditions, and recording the weathering rates of the andesite stone that serves as the inscription's primary material. The inscription has been registered as a Cultural Heritage Object under the Decree of the Minister of Education and Culture of the Republic of Indonesia No. SK 77/M/2019, dated March 12, 2019, thereby receiving legal protection from the state.

In addition to physical preservation, research institutions such as the West Sumatra Archaeological Office (now integrated into the National Research and Innovation Agency (BRIN) and several local universities also conduct epigraphic research and re-documentation of the inscription for academic purposes and scientific publication. Outreach regarding the historical value of the Pagaruyung V inscription is continuously carried out by universities, the BPK, and both Regency and Provincial Cultural Offices to ensure this heritage remains preserved as a source of knowledge for younger generations. The inscription has been utilized as a medium for education on history, culture, myths, and folklore by the local community.

== See also ==
- Dharmasraya
- Melayu Kingdom
- History of Indian influence on Southeast Asia
