= Wurare inscription =

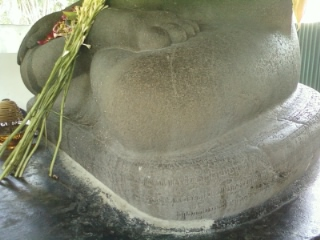
Wurare Inscription, left side picture.

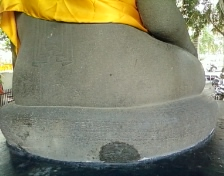
Wurare Inscription, back side picture.

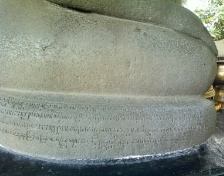
Wurare Inscription, right side picture.

The Wurare inscription (Indonesian: Prasasti Wurare) is an inscription commemorating the coronation of the statue Mahaksobhya in a place called Wurare. The inscription is written in Sanskrit, dated November 21, 1289 CE. The statue is a tribute and a symbol for Kertanegara, king of Singhasari kingdom, which was considered by his descendants to have achieved the degree of Jina (Great Buddha). The inscriptions are written circulary on the pedestal base of the Buddha statue.

The inscription consists of 19 verses, which among others tells a story of a powerful priest named Arrya Bharad, who divided Java into two kingdoms named Janggala and Pangjalu, using magic water from his water pot. The act was done to avoid a civil war between two princes who wanted to fight for power.

The statue was originally found in Kandang Gajak area. Kandang Gajak is in the vicinity of Trowulan, Mojokerto Regency, East Java, Indonesia. In 1817, the statue was moved to Surabaya by a Dutch East Indies officer, Resident Baron AM Th. de Salis, and it is currently placed in the Apsari Park, near downtown Surabaya, East Java.

== Inscription text ==
Transliteration and conjectural translation of this inscription text according to Kern, as follows:

== Transliteration ==
1. adāu namāmi sarbājñaṃ, jñānakayan tathāgataṃ, sarwwaskandhātiguhyasthani, sad-satpakṣawarjjitaṃ.
2. anw atas sarwwasiddhim wā, wande'hang gaurawāt sadā, çākakālam idaṃ wakṣye, rajakïrttiprakaçanaṃ.
3. yo purā paṇḍitaç çreṣṭha, āryyo bharāḍ abhijñātah, jñānasiddhim samagāmyā, bhijñālabho munïçwarah.
4. mahāyogïçwaro dhïrah, satweṣu kāruṇātmakah, siddhācāryyo māhawïro rāgādikleçawarjjitah.
5. ratnākarapramāṇān tu, dwaidhïkṛtya yawāwanlm, kṣitibhedanam sāmarthya, kumbhawajrodakena wai.
6. nrpayoṛ yuddhākaiikṣinoh, estāsmaj janggalety eṣā, pamjaluwiṣayā smṛtā
7. kin tu yasmāt raraksemām, jaya-çrï-wiṣnuwarddhanah, çrï-jayawarddhanïbhāryyo, jagannāthottamaprabhuh
8. ājanmapariçuddhānggah, krpāluh dharmmatatparah, pārthiwanandanang krtwā, çuddhakïrttiparākramāt
9. ekïkrtya punar bhümïm, prïtyārthan jagatām sadā, dharmmasamrakṣanārtham wā pitrādhiṣthāpanāya ca
10. yathaiwa kṣitirājendrag, çrï-hariwarddhanātmajah, çrï-jayawarddhanïputrah, caturdwïpegwaro munih
11. ageṣatatwasampürnno, dharmmāgastrawidam warah, jïrnnodhārakriyodyukto, dharmmagasanadecakah
12. çrï-jnānaçiwabajrākya, ç çittaratnawibhüsanah, prajñāragmiwiçuddhānggas, sambodhijñānapāragah
13. subhaktyā tam pratiṣthāpya, swayaṃ purwwam pratiṣthitam, çmāçane urarenāmni, mahākṣobhyānurüpatah
14. bhawacakre çakendrābde, māse cāsujisaṃjñāke, pañcaṃyām çuklapakse ca, ware, a-ka-bu-saṃjñāke
15. sintanāmni ca parwwe ca, karane wiṣtisaṃskrte, anurādhe'pi naksatre, mitre ahendramandale
16. saubhāgyayogasaṃbandhe, somye caiwa muhürttake, kyāte kuweraparwwege tulārāçyabhisaṃyute
17. hitāya sarbasatwānām, prāg ewa nrpates sadā, saputrapotradārasva kṣityekibhāwakāranāt
18. athāsya dāsabhüto'ham, nādajño nama kïrttinah, widyāhïno'pi saṃmuḍho, dharmmakriyāṣw atatparah
19. dhārmmadhyakṣatwam āsādya, krpayaiwāsj'a tatwatah, sakākalam sambaddhatya, tadrājānujnayā puñah

=== Translation ===
1. First of all I revere the Tathagata, the omniscient and the embodiment of all knowledge, who lies hidden in all the elements (skandhas) and who is devoid of association with things existing or non-existent.
2. Next do I honour, respectfully, the universal success und shall (then) narrate (the following history connected with) the Saka era describing the glory of kings.
3. The venerable Bharad, the lord amongst sages and the best of learned men, who, in ancient times, through his experience, obtained (perfection in) knowledge and thus acquired the supernatural faculties (abhijna).(*1)
4. Who was the lord of the great yogins, calm and compassionate towards living beings, who was a Siddha teacher, a great hero and who was devoid of the stains of attachment, etc.
5-6. Who divided into two the land of Java which was as extensive as the sea, by means of the water pot (kumbha), vajra and water(*2) (?) which had the power of breaking up the earth and (gave them to) the two princes who, out of hostility, were bent on strife - therefore this Jangala is known as the Pamjalu vishaya.
7-9. But, hereafter the lord Jayasrivisnuvardhana - who had as his spouse Sri Jayavardhani, who was the best among the rulers of the earth, who was pure in body from his (very) birth, who was compassionate and exclusively devoted to the Law, who caused delight to (other) rulers through his pure fame and valour - again united this land to the delight of the people in order to maintain the Law and to establish(*3) his ancestors and ruled it (with justice).
10-12. The sage of a king named Sri Jnanasivavajra, the son of Sri Harivardhana and Sri Jayavardhani, was the lord of the four islands, was full of boundless knowledge, was the best of those knowing the Law and was the instructor in the code of laws, whose mind was his jewel-ornament and who was eager to do the work of repairing (religious institutions), whose body was purified by the rays of wisdom and who was fully versed in the knowledge of sambodhi - was like Indra among the rulers of the earth.
13-17. Having set up with due devotion the statue of him (i.e., the king ?) who was already consecrated (as such ?) in the shape of Mahakshobhya, in the year 1211 of the Saka era in the month of Asuji (Asvina), on the day known as Pa-ka-bu, the fifth day of the bright half (of the month), in the parvan named Sinta and the karana vishti, when the nakshatra Anuradha was in the orb of Indra, during Saubhagya yoga and Saumya muhurta and in Tula rasi - for the good of all beings, and foremost of all, for that of the king with his wife, son and grandson, owing to his bringing about the union of the kingdom.
18-19. I, his (i.e. king's) humble servant, who is known by the name of Nadajna, and though ignorant, devoid of learning and little inclined to pious deeds, was made through his grace alone the superintendent of religious rites, have prepared this description by order of Vajrajnana (?).(*4)

Note:

(*1) Refers to supernatural faculties of Buddha: to take any form, to hear from any distance, to see to any distance, to read the thoughts of men, to know about their situation.
(*2) The sense of vajra - and how the division came about - is not clear.
(*3) Sthapana probably refers to erecting (an image), maybe of ancestors.
(*4) Translation only conjectural.
