= Ananggawarman =

Ananggawarman was a crown prince (yuvaraja) of the Malayapura kingdom, which ruled at the end of the 14th century. The Malayapura kingdom was centered on the Minangkabau Highlands and its territory covers much of central Sumatra. The name Ananggawarman is inscribed on Saruaso II inscription as the son of King Adityawarman (r. 1347–1375). It is not clear when Ananggawarman began to reign in place of his father, but it was written in the History of Ming that the kingdom sent a messenger again to China in 1376.

Ananggawarman is mentioned in the inscription with the title Hevajra nityasmrti, which indicated that he professed the same belief as his father, the Tantric Buddhism. This means that the rulers of Sumatra embraced esoteric Buddhism at least until the 14th century. In those days it was also thought that trade between Sumatra and South India was going well and there were quite a number of South Indian merchants settled in Minangkabau, as there is also found an inscription (Bandar Bapahat) written in two scripts, the Kawi and the Grantha.

After the reign of Ananggawarman, the historical record of Minangkabau was not found again for a century and a half, until the arrival of the Portuguese adventurer Tomé Pires who wrote about it in Suma Oriental around 1513–1515. Subsequently, the royal power (now called Pagaruyung kingdom) further weakened until its coastal regions such as Kampar, Indragiri, and Siak were seized by the Aceh and Malacca sultanates, and eventually became independent polities.

== See also ==
- Adityawarman
- Pagaruyung kingdom

Preceded by Adityawarman	King of Pagaruyung; 1375 – c. end 14th century	Succeeded by Wijayawarman
