= Amoghapasa inscription =

Indonesian inscription

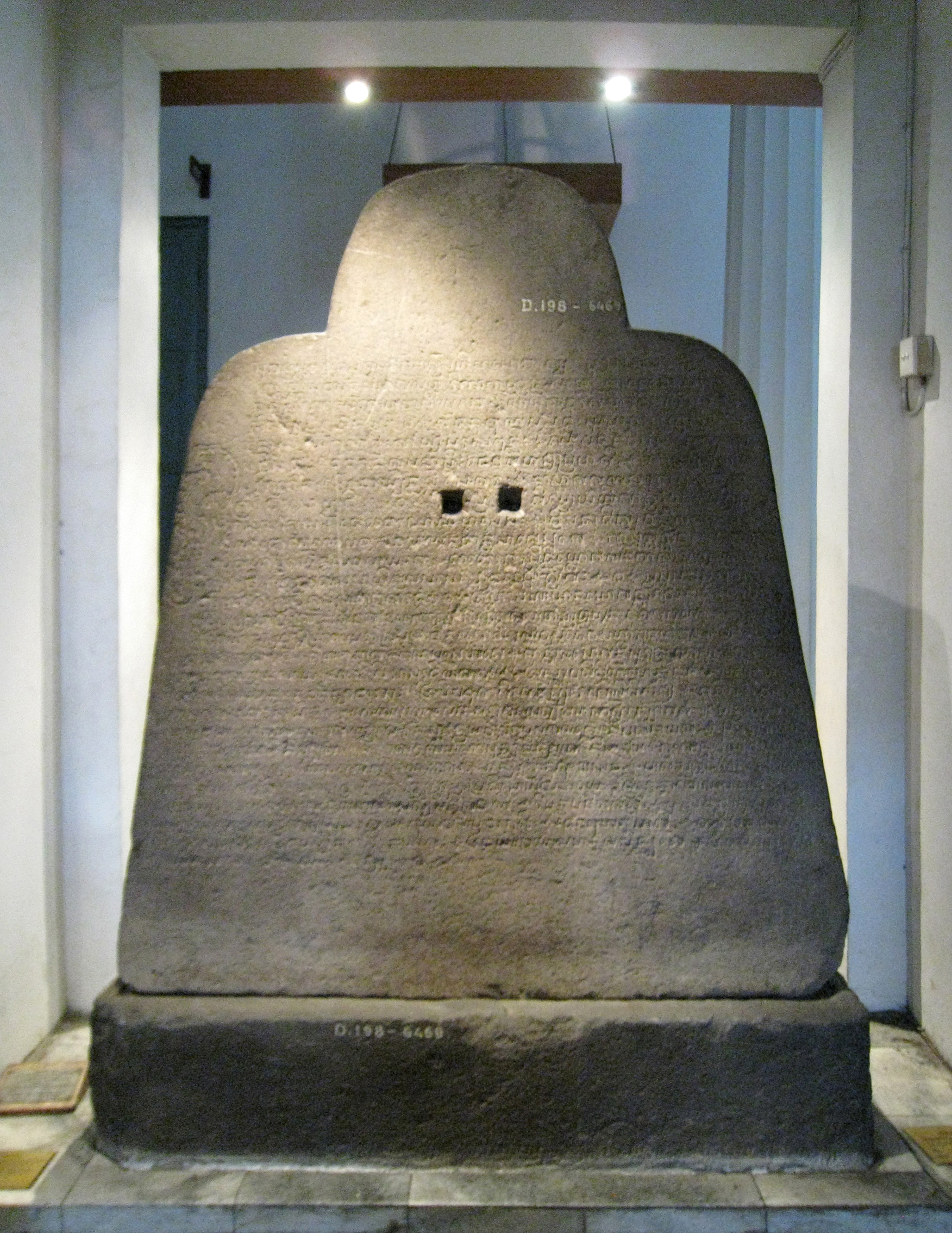
Inscription written on backside of Amoghapasa statue, while the rectangular base is called Padang Roco inscription.

The Amoghapasa inscription is an inscription inscribed on the back of pāduka Amoghapāśa as referred to in the Padang Roco Inscription.

In 1347, Adityawarman added this inscription on back of the statue proclaimed that the statue portrayed himself. Today the inscription is stored in the National Museum of Indonesia in Jakarta with inventory number D.198-6469 (the statue part).
