= Pagaruyung, Tanjung Emas, Tanah Datar =

Pagaruyung (Indonesian pronunciation: [paɡaˈrujʊŋ]) is an Indonesian village in Tanjung Emas District, Tanah Datar, West Sumatra. From tambo sources, this country was formerly the capital of the Pagaruyung Kingdom.

In 1803-1804, a group of pilgrims from Minangkabau returned to their country. They were impressed by the Wahhabi conquest of Mecca in early 1803, and wanted to change Minangkabau society through violence. They are called Padri and criticize Minang customs such as gambling, cockfighting, opium, liquor, tobacco except betel, as well as Minangkabau customs which regulate the line of descent from the mother's side (matrilineal). This method of violence led to civil war in Minangkabau society. In 1815, the Pagaruyung royal family were all massacred by the Padri. In 1819, the Dutch returned to Padang after the British left it. The surviving royal families and the penghulu (customary heads) asked the Dutch for help in dealing with the Padri violence. In February 1821 they signed an agreement in which they handed over to the Dutch sovereignty over Minang lands. Not long after, the Dutch attacked Padri. Begin the Padri War, which lasted until 1838.

Since 2001, the local government of Tanah Datar Regency has begun to gradually move the center of government from Batusangkar to Pagaruyung. Where this program began by establishing the Regent's office in the area of the country at this time.
