= Cultural properties of Indonesia =

Physical cultural heritage in Indonesia

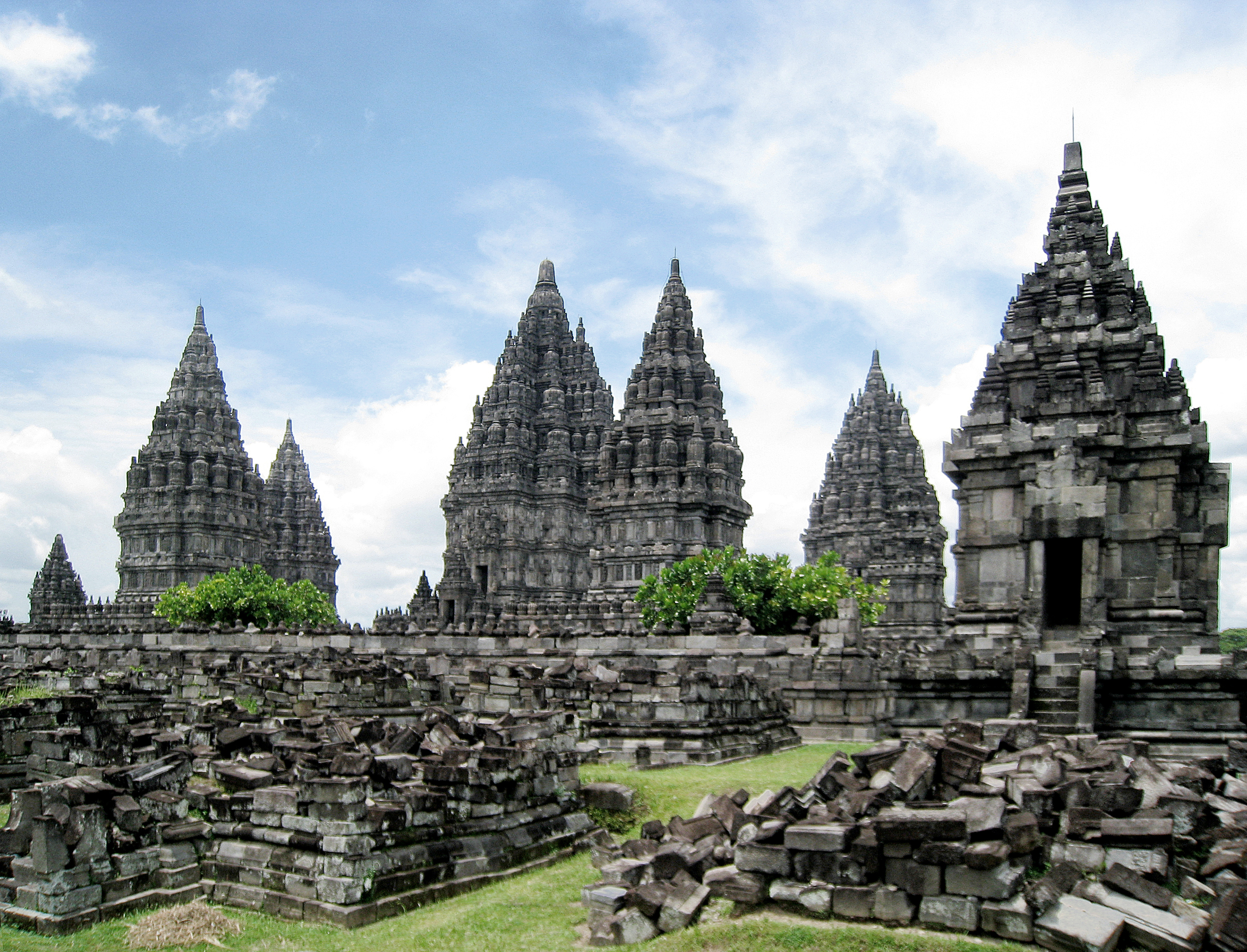
The Prambanan complex is one of 8,232 immovable cultural properties in Indonesia

Cultural properties of Indonesia are those items defined by Indonesian law as of "important value for history, science, and culture", and include both man-made artefacts and natural objects. The cultural properties number more than 8,000 and include ancient Hindu and Buddhist temples, mosques, historic colonial buildings, forts, art galleries, national parks and beaches. A number of the sites are World Heritage Sites.

The current regime for the protection and promotion of the cultural properties of Indonesia (Indonesian: benda cagar budaya) is governed by the Act of the Republic of Indonesia No. 5, 1992, concerning Items of Cultural Property. Such measures are to be understood against the background of Section 32 of the 1945 Constitution, according to which "The Government develops the National Culture of Indonesia". Regulation no. 10 of 1993 prescribes the registration of items of cultural property, which is to be undertaken by the relevant second level administrative area. As of 2008, some 8,232 immovable cultural properties and heritage sites have been identified, the last being those places in which items of cultural property are contained.

== Legal basis ==
Cultural properties in Indonesia have been protected since at least 1931, when the colonial government of the Dutch East Indies passed Ordinance Number 19 of 1931 regarding Monuments, which was later amended with another ordinance in 1934. Since 1992, cultural properties have been protected under Act of the Republic of Indonesia Number 5 of 1992 regarding Cultural Properties (Undang-Undang Republik Indonesia Nomor 5 Tahun 1992 tentang Benda Cagar Budaya), which was passed by President Suharto on 21 March. This new law was passed as the old, colonial laws were considered no longer applicable.

Article I of the act defines a cultural property as of "important value for history, science, and culture", being either a man-made object or group of objects, movable (bergerak) or immovable (tidak bergerak), aged at least fifty years which has or have high historical value; or natural objects with high historical value. Said objects, under Articles IV and V, generally belong to and are under the domain of the national government. However, Article VI allows private ownership under certain conditions. The act then goes on to regulate the search for and discovery of historical objects, as well as their keeping and maintenance.

Under Chapter VII of the act, there are several criminal offences related to cultural properties. The intentional damage, theft, relocation, and/or disfigurement of cultural properties, under Article XXVI, is a felony offence punishable by up to ten years in prison and/or a maximum fine of Rp. 100 million (US$10,500). Illegal searches for cultural properties, under Article XVII, is a felony offence which can be punished by up to five years in prison and/or a Rp. 50 million (US$5,250) fine. Persons who neglect to maintain cultural objects, as required in Article 10 subsection 1, face a criminal misdemeanor charge carrying a maximum of one year in prison and a Rp. 10 million (US$1,050) fine.

Indonesia's cultural properties are managed and studied by their respective provincial authorities known as Balai Pelestarian Cagar Budaya (BPCB). The BPCB does not have an official English translation, and usually remains untranslated when referred to in documents in other languages. Nevertheless, BPCB means "Centre for the Conservation of Cultural Properties."

== Objects ==
As of 2008, some 8,232 immovable cultural properties and heritage sites have been identified, the last being those places in which items considered cultural properties are contained. Several examples follow below:

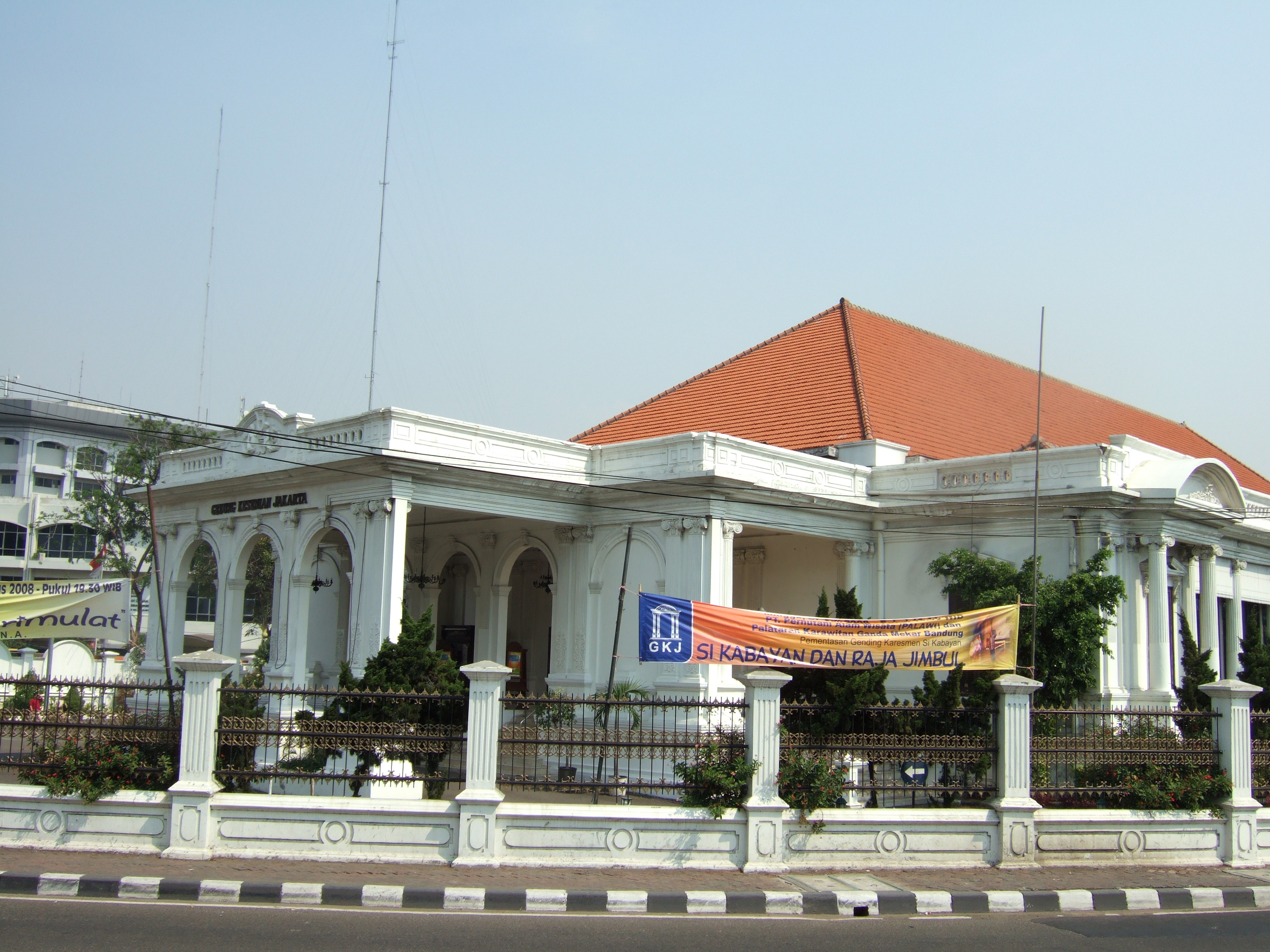
The Jakarta Art Building, one of numerous objects in Jakarta

- Borobudur Temple (Candi Borobudur, in Magelang, Central Java
- Bosscha District (Kawasan Bosscha), in Lembang, West Java
- Cathedral Church (Gereja Katredal), in Jakarta
- Demak Great Mosque (Masjid Agung Demak), in Demak, Central Java
- Jakarta Art Building (Gedung Kesenian Jakarta), in Jakarta
- Haji Usmar Ismail Cinema Building (Gedung Sinematek Haji Usmar Ismail), in Jakarta
- Kudus Mosque (Masjid Kudus), in Kudus, Central Java
- Kuta Beach District (Kawasan Pantai Kuta Bali), in Badung, Bali
- Ismail Marzuki Cultural Centre (Taman Ismail Marzuki), in Jakarta
- Istiqlal Mosque (Masjid Istiqlal), in Jakarta
- National Gallery of Indonesia (Galeri Nasional Indonesia), in Jakarta
- National Monument (Monumen Nasional), in Jakarta
- National Press Monument (Monumen Pers Nasional), in Surakarta
- National Museum (Museum Nasional), in Jakarta
- Nusa Dua Tourist District (Kawasan Wisata Nusa Dua), in Nusa Dua, Bali
- Oranje Fortress (Benteng Oranje), in Ternate, North Maluku
- Prambanan Temple Complex (Kawasan Candi Prambanan), in Klaten, Central Java
- Sam Poo Kong Temple (Kelenteng Sam Poo Kong), in Semarang, Central Java
- Fort Rotterdam (Benteng Rotterdam), in Makassar, South Sulawesi
- Sumbawa King's Palace (Istana Raja Sumbawa), in Sumbawa, West Nusa Tenggara
- Muhammadan Mosque (Masjid Muhammadan), in Padang, West Sumatra
- Maimun Palace (Istana Maimun), in Medan, North Sumatra
- Tjong A Fie Mansion (Rumah Tjong A Fie), in Medan, North Sumatra
- Sri Mariamman Temple (Kuil Sri Mariamman), in Medan, North Sumatra
- Siak Sri Indrapura Palace (Istana Siak Sri Indrapura), in Siak, Riau

== See also ==
- History of Indonesia
- Culture of Indonesia
- List of heritage registers
- List of World Heritage Sites in Indonesia
- List of national parks of Indonesia
