= Nicolaas Johannes Krom =

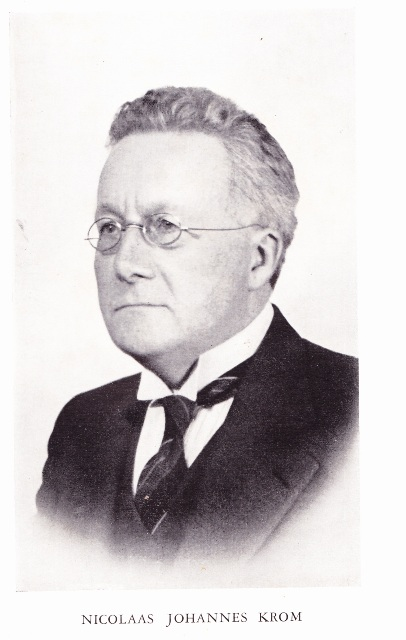
N.J. Krom

Krom, letter (1912)

Nicolaas Johannes Krom ('s-Hertogenbosch, 5 September 1883 – Leiden, 8 March 1945) was a Dutch orientalist, epigraphist, archaeologist, and an Indonesian early history and traditional culture researcher. He was one of the figures of the "Dutch school" of Indonesian philological historiography studies. One of his works that has long been a reference regarding ancient Indonesian history is Hindoe-Javaansche Geschiedenis (1926).
