= Jamik Sungai Jambu Mosque =

Mosque in Tanah Datar, West Sumatra, Indonesia

Coordinates: 0.43957°S 100.51458°E

Masjid Mutaqaddimin
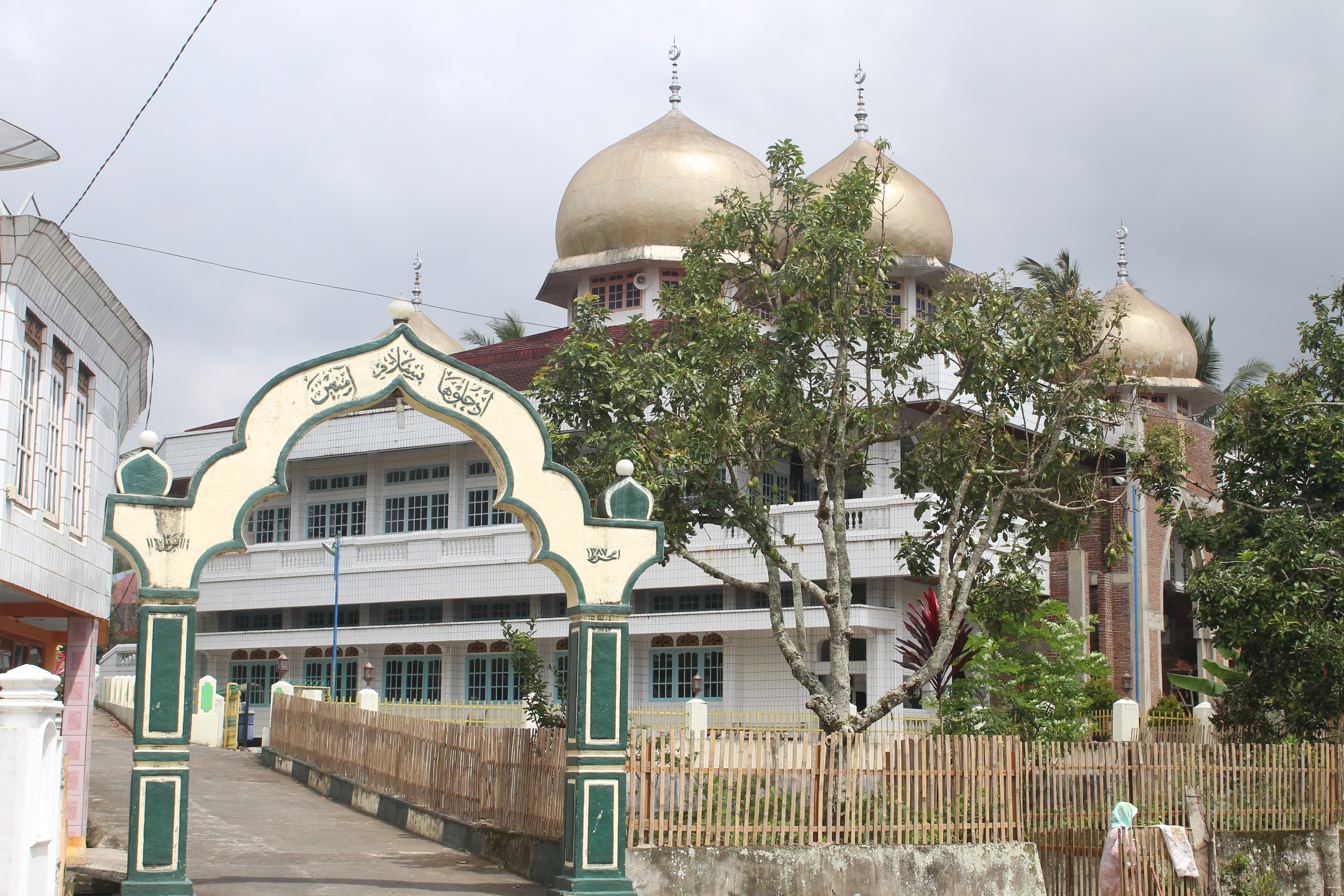

Religion
- Affiliation: Islam
- Branch/tradition: Sunni

Location
- Location: Jorong Sungai Jambu, Sungai Jambu Nagari, Pariangan District, Tanah Datar Regency, West Sumatra, Indonesia
- Interactive map of Masjid Mutaqaddimin

Architecture
- Type: Mosque
- Groundbreaking: 1918

Jamik Sungai Jambu Mosque is one of the oldest mosques in Indonesia located in Jorong Sungai River, Sungai Jambu Nagari, Pariangan District, Tanah Datar Regency, West Sumatra. The mosque was built in 1918 at the foot of Mount Marapi, and during its development it has experienced a number of improvements both in terms of outlook and management. The mosque had ranked first for several times including in 2012, in the assessment of environmentally-oriented mosques for the provincial level which is conducted by the Indonesian Mosque Council.

Currently, other than being used for Islamic worship activities, the mosque is also used as a place for religious education for the surrounding community. In addition, a number of religious and social activities are also regularly held in this mosque.

== History ==
The mosque is located in Sungai Jambu Nagari, Pariangan District, Tanah Datar Regency, which is mentioned in Tambo Minangkabau as one of the oldest nagaris in Minangkabau. The construction of the mosque began in 1918. With the flow of funds from both overseas and local populations, the structure of the building was finally made permanently stable and safe in 1988. The next development of the mosque had been fixing of the management system and activities it holds, in order to turn the mosque into the center of social activities among the local community.

The rise of community-based social activities centered in the mosque has made the Ministry of Religious Affairs selecting the mosque as the best mosque for the province for several times. At the national level, the mosque is also a candidate of the Environmental Plenary Observatory.

== Activity ==
In addition to its main function as a place for worship, various religious activities and social activities are also regularly organized in this mosque. Religious activities that have begun include a program called Pondok Al-Qur'an, which is aimed at deepening of the ability to memorize Quran which is held by imams. In addition, there are also Arabic and English learning courses.

The mosque which has a building area of 600 square meters also has a library with a collection of hundreds of titles. In addition to the field of education for both public and religious purposes, the mosque also plays a role in the field of health services. Routinely, the mosque held an activity called Balai Kesehatan Masjid, which is a medical checkup conducted every Sunday without collecting fees with doctors invited from nearby puskesmas (community health centers). On the other hand, in order to sustain the economy of the community, the mosque also supports business in the form of cooperation. The mosque is also managing the funds which is collected as zakat for providing compensations for orphans around the mosque.
