= Lima Kaum Grand Mosque =

Mosque in Lima Kaum, Tanah Datar Regency, West Sumatra, Indonesia

Coordinates: 0°27′56″S 100°34′05″E

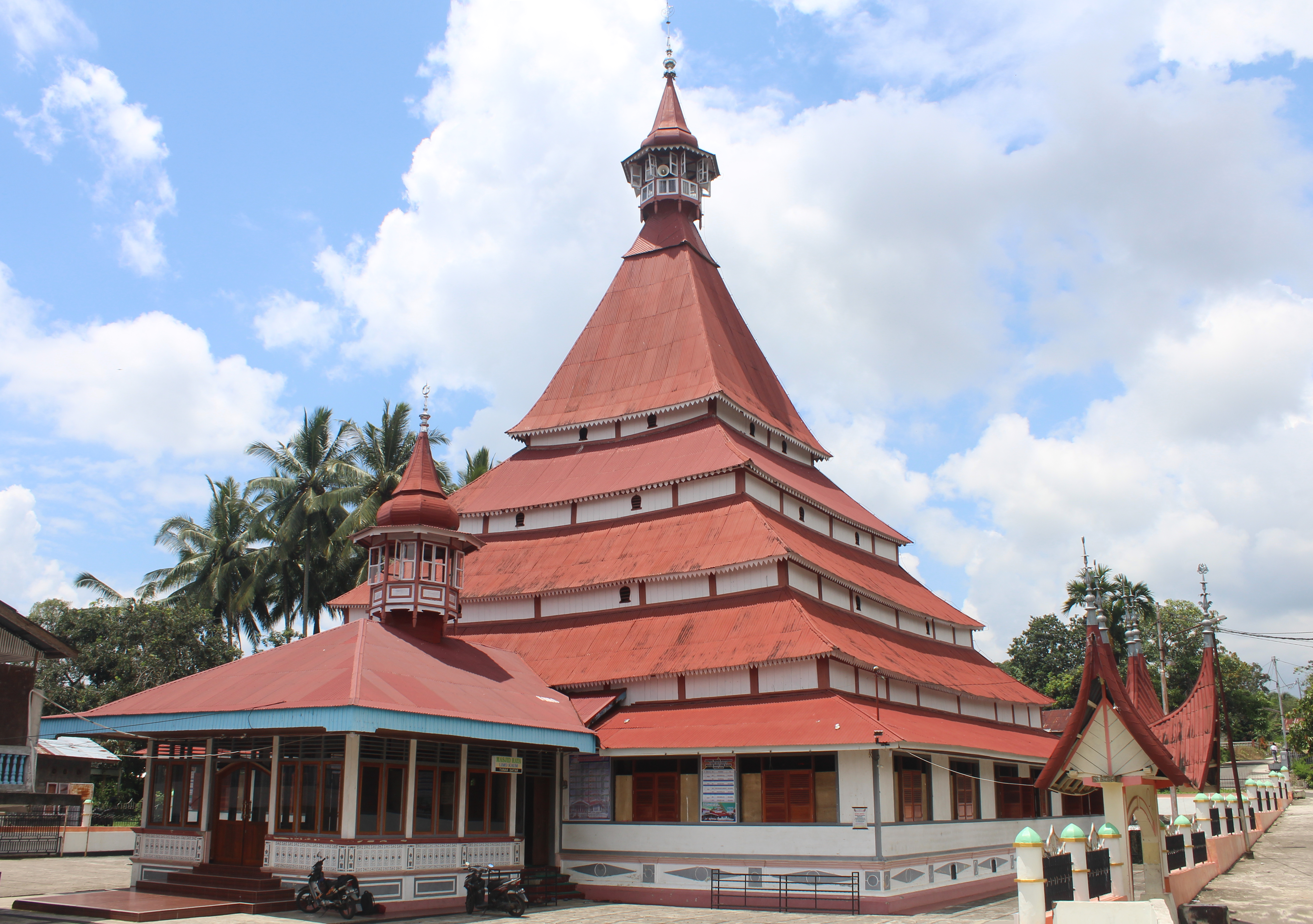
- Lima Kaum Grand Mosque, February 2020

Religion
- Affiliation: Islam

Location
- Location: Lima Kaum, Tanah Datar Regency, West Sumatra, Indonesia
- Interactive map of Lima Kaum Grand Mosque

Architecture
- Type: Mosque
- Style: Minangkabau
- Groundbreaking: 1710
- Minaret: 1

Lima Kaum Grand Mosque is one of the oldest mosques in Indonesia, located in Nagari Lima Kaum, Tanah Datar Regency, West Sumatra. The mosque is thought to have been built in 1710. It is located in the center of Nagari Lima Kaum, in Balai Sariak, Jorong Tigo Tumpuka, about 20 meters from the road to Batusangkar and on to Padang.

In 2010, this mosque was recognized as an Indonesian cultural property along with other mosques in West Java, such as Bingkudu Mosque in Nagari Canduang Koto Laweh, Rao Rao Mosque in Nagari Rao Rao, and Ganting Grand Mosque in Padang.

== History ==
The year that this mosque was built is not known for sure. However, it is known that a mosque was founded in Nagari Lima Kaum in the mid 17th century, following the entrance of Islam into the Minangkabau Highlands. The mosque was located in Jorong Balai Batu and was a simple building without a roof or walls, known in the Minangkabau language as baaleh batu, badindiang angin, or baatok langik. At an unknown time, a replacement mosque was built in another location, Jorong Tigo Tumpuak, but it did not remain there long because of capacity issues. In 1710, a mosque was built on the site of a pagoda that had not been used for some time because the people in the area had converted to Islam. This was the Lima Kaum Grand Mosque.

Members of the local community built the mosque together. The mosque building was constructed from wooden planks, from the walls to the pillars, while the roof was made from palm fronds. Through renovations, a metal roof was added. Other renovations were carried out, including repairing and widening the mihrab, adding a veranda, repairing windows and installing glass, replacing deteriorating planks, and building an upper level.

== Architecture ==
Lima Kaum Grand Mosque was built long before the Dutch came to Minangkabau, meaning that there are no Western or Dutch influences on the mosque's architecture. Instead, the architecture shows Minangkabau influence and the shape of the roof demonstrates syncretism between Hindu-Buddhist practices and Islam.

The mosque has a rectangular footprint and was constructed in the area where a pagoda once stood that had since fallen into disuse because the people of the area had converted to Islam. The roof of the mosque is built in five levels and is not flat, but instead concave, making it suitable for tropical climates such as that in Minangkabau because it allows rainwater to drain quickly. Between each of the roof levels, there is a gap to allow light in. The top level is in the shape of an octagon and includes glass windows and a pyramid-shaped peak. From the top of the mosque there is a view of the houses in the area as well as of the city of Batusangkar.

=== Main hall ===
Inside the main hall, which is used for salah, there are pillars made of wood. The main pillar has a diameter of 75 centimeters and a height of 55 meters. All the wood that was used was collected in land spanning from Bukit Sankiang to Bukit Dadieh Talago Gunuang over the course of a year. The main pillar is covered with panels to form an octagon. Inside it are stairs spiraling to the left that lead to the top of the mosque.

There are several windows on each wall of the main hall, six on the north and south sides and four on the east and west sides. Though there have already been several different renovations, the walls, floors, and pillars are still made of wood. During a renovation, the mihrab was reconstructed out of ceramic. In the eastern portion, next to the south of the main hall, is a bedug, or tabuah in Minang language, made of a tree trunk with a diameter of between 27 and 60 centimeters and a length of 220 centimeters.

=== Veranda ===
To the front of the building, which faces east, is a veranda that serves as a room, complete with windows and a concrete foundation. It has doors to the north and south. Besides functioning as an entryway, the veranda also is a space for studying the Quran and a place to leave footwear. On the roof is an octagonal tower with two windows on each side. It is topped with a dome in the shape of a gourd.

== Symbolism ==
According to tradition, Lima Kaum Grand Mosque is a symbol of peace between Datuk Ketumanggungan and Datuk Perpatih Nan Sebatang, who were at odds over Minangkabau customs. Before the mosque was built, the two had been in conflict, which culminated in the Batu Batikam incident. The conflict continued until the leader of Lima Kaum suggested that they hold a kenduri as a symbol of peace, which would be held alongside the building of a mosque with a five-tiered roof.

According to Hamka, Lima Kaum Grand Mosque's architecture is an important symbol of the acceptance of the people's ancestors into Islam. He wrote in the newspaper Haluan on April 14, 1951 that he hoped the government would maintain the mosque instead of demolishing it and replacing it with a building that did not have the same sort of unique characteristics. In 1968, Hamka suggested that the palm-leaf roof be replaced but that it maintain its five-tier structure.

== See also ==
- List of mosques in Indonesia
