= Atar, Padang Ganting =

District of Indonesia

Atar
- Nagari
- Location of Atar in Sumatra
- Coordinates: 0°31′45″S 100°44′47″E
- Country: Indonesia
- Province: West Sumatra
- Regency: Tanah Datar Regency
- District: Padang Ganting

Area
  - Total: 50.25 km^{2} (19.40 sq mi)

Population (2019)
  - Total: 4,908
  - Density: 97.67/km^{2} (253.0/sq mi)
- Time zone: UTC+7 (Western Indonesia Time)

Atar (Indonesian pronunciation: [ˈat̪ar]) is a nagari (settlement) in Padang Ganting, Tanah Datar Regency, in the Indonesian province of West Sumatra, with a population of just under 5,000 people.

== Geography and administration ==
Atar is located approximately 23 km (10 mi) away from the regency capital at Batusangkar, and is one of two nagari in Padang Ganting. It is the larger nagari, although less populated, making up 50.25 km^{2} (19.40 sq mi) out of 83.5 km^{2} (32.2 sq mi) area of Padang Ganting. Atar is further subdivided into three Jorong or neighborhoods: Lareh Nan Panjang, Taratak VIII, and Taratak XII.

In the past, Atar was merged with Padang Ganting as one nagari, although it later split off. During the Padri War, Muslim clerical forces based in Atar would launch raids against traditional Minangkabau aristocrats in Padang Ganting.

== Demographics ==
Atar has a population of 4,908 in 2019 according to Statistics Indonesia, making up 1,393 households. The gender ratio is 92. The largest proportion of the workforce is employed in agriculture, with natural rubber being a common commodity.

== Economy ==
There is a large diaspora of migrants from Atar, especially in West Java, which engage in the photocopier industry – namely, operating photocopy shops typically serving government offices and schools/universities. The trend was initiated by a man named Yuskar, who migrated to Bandung in 1974 and established a stationery and photocopier store. It was estimated that out of around 3,000 migrants from Atar, nearly all are engaged in the trade. There is a monument of a photocopier to commemorate the tradition in the nagari.

== Facilities ==
There are five public elementary schools in Atar, and one middle school, although there are no high schools, with the only one in the district being located in Padang Ganting nagari. There are also three supporting health centers in the nagari.
