= Surau Lubuk Bauk =

Surau in West Sumatra, Indonesia

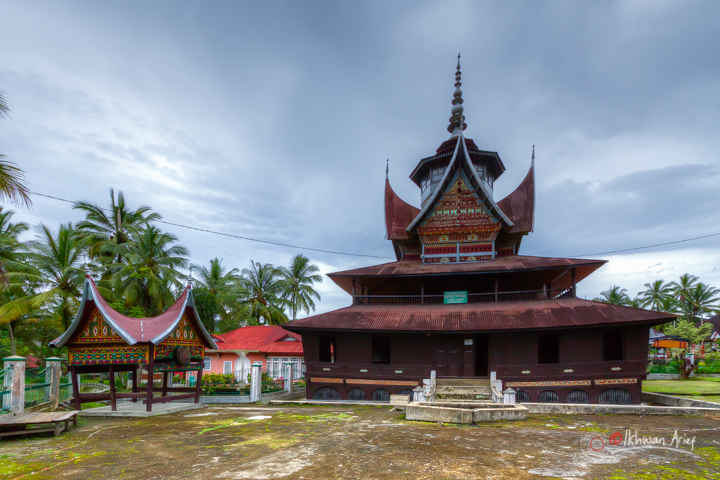

- Location within Indonesia

General information
- Status: Active
- Type: Surau
- Architectural style: Minangkabawi architecture
- Classification: Islamic place for prayers
- Location: Tanah Datar Regency, Indonesia
- Coordinates: 0°28′38″S 100°27′31″E

Surau Lubuk Bauk is a surau located in the settlement of Batipuah Baruah within the Tanah Datar Regency in West Sumatra, Indonesia. Built between 1896 and 1901, it currently functions as a madrasa for young children. It is located within the compound of Masjid al-ʿUlā, the main mosque of the village.

== History ==
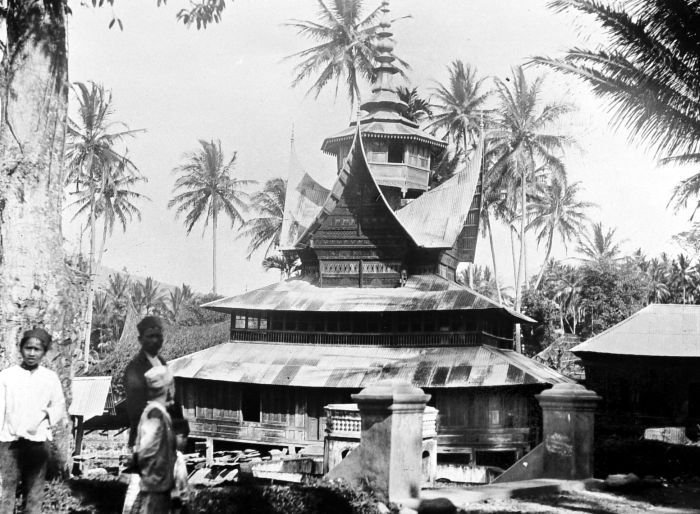
A black-and-white photograph of the surau, taken in the colonial era.

Surau Lubuk Bauk was built between 1896 and 1901 by members of the Suku Jambak tribe, on land endowed by a wealthy man named Datuk Bandaro Panjang. As a traditional surau, it was intended to serve as a place of prayer for the villagers as well as a religious educational institution. In 1925, famed Muslim activist and writer Abdul Malik Karim Amrullah, better known as Buya Hamka, studied in the surau with his teacher Sheikh Harun. In the 1980s, a mosque named Masjid al-ʿUlā was built next to the surau, hence transferring the duties of daily prayers and Jumu'ah to the newly-built mosque instead of the surau.

Currently, the surau functions as a madrasa for young children, with a special emphasis on learning the Qur'an. The surau has also been marked as a heritage site of the Tanah Datar Regency by the Cultural Preservation Centre of Batusangkar.

Surau Lubuk Bauk has often been mistaken as being a mosque and is alternatively referred to as Masjid Lubuk Bauk due to this misidentification.

== Architecture ==
Surau Lubuk Bauk is a fine example of a traditional surau built by the people of Minangkabau. The three-tiered roof of the building is made of zinc, with the first and second levels being pyramid-shaped with concave surfaces while the third level has a cross-plan roof with four arched openings on each of the four sides. A small wooden pavilion, situated on a platform and covered by a conical dome, rises atop the highest point of the zinc roof and functions as a makeshift minaret. The conical dome is seemingly inspired by the pointed roofs of Hindu temples in Bali and pre-Islamic Sumatra.

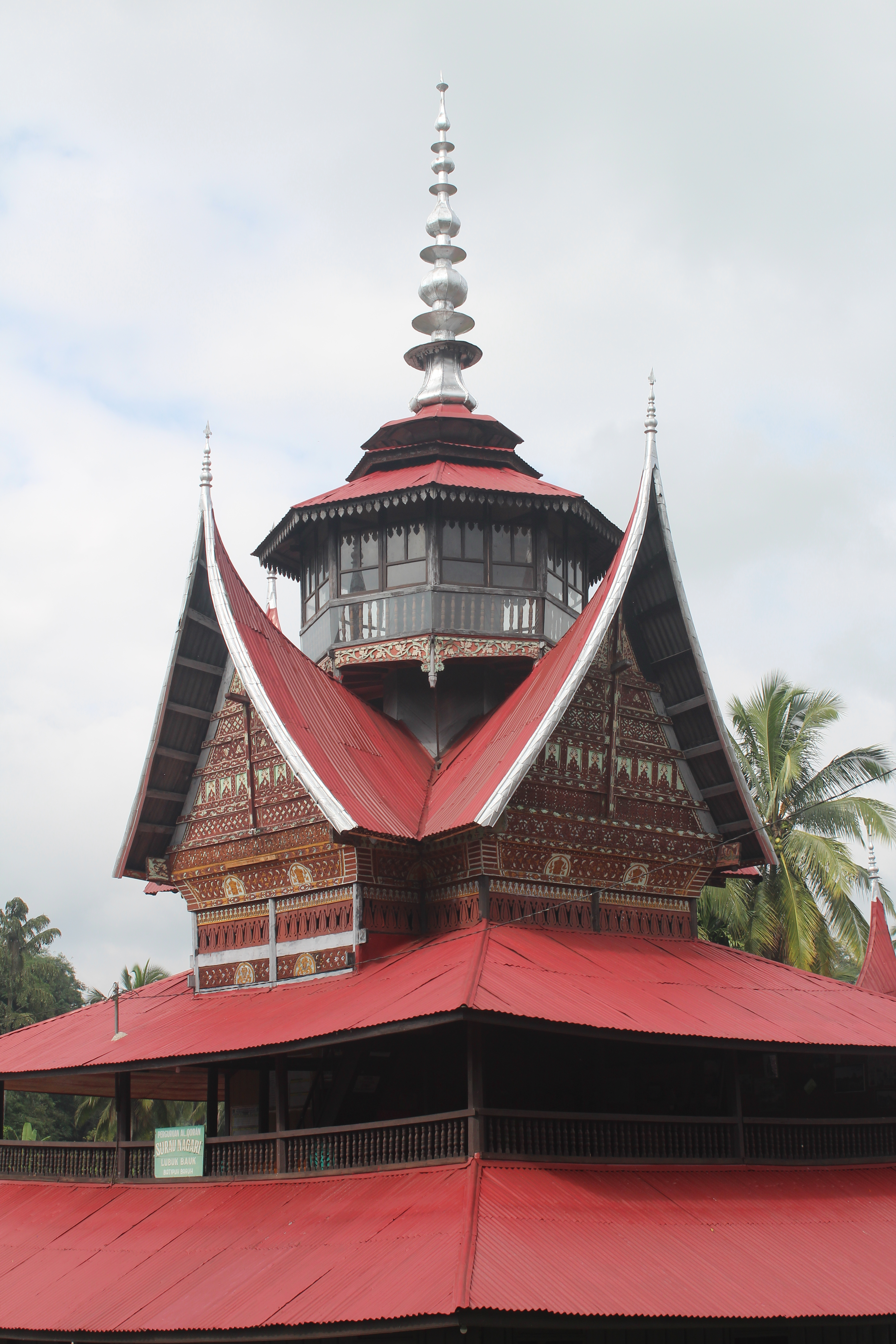
The roofs of Surau Lubuk Bauk are made of zinc, with a conical dome atop the highest of the roofs.

The surau is elevated above ground and accessible via a wide staircase of four steps at the entrance. Inside the surau, thirty octagonal wooden pillars act as support structures and are connected the floors and roof via the classic Dougong technique. The mihrab etches deep into the qibla wall of the surau and from the outside it is topped by a terraced roof. A doorway at the side enters into a staircase that leads into the second floor of the surau.

== In popular culture ==
The surau appeared in the 2013 Indonesian romantic film, The Sinking of van der Wijck that was directed by Sunil Soraya and produced by Soraya Intercine Films. This helped the surau to gain popularity as a destination for local tourism.

== See also ==
- Surau
- Architecture of Minangkabau
