= Koto Baru Grand Mosque =

Mosque in South Solok, West Sumatra, Indonesia

Coordinates: 1.481637°S 101.059198°E

Koto Baru Grand Mosque Masjid Raya Koto Baru
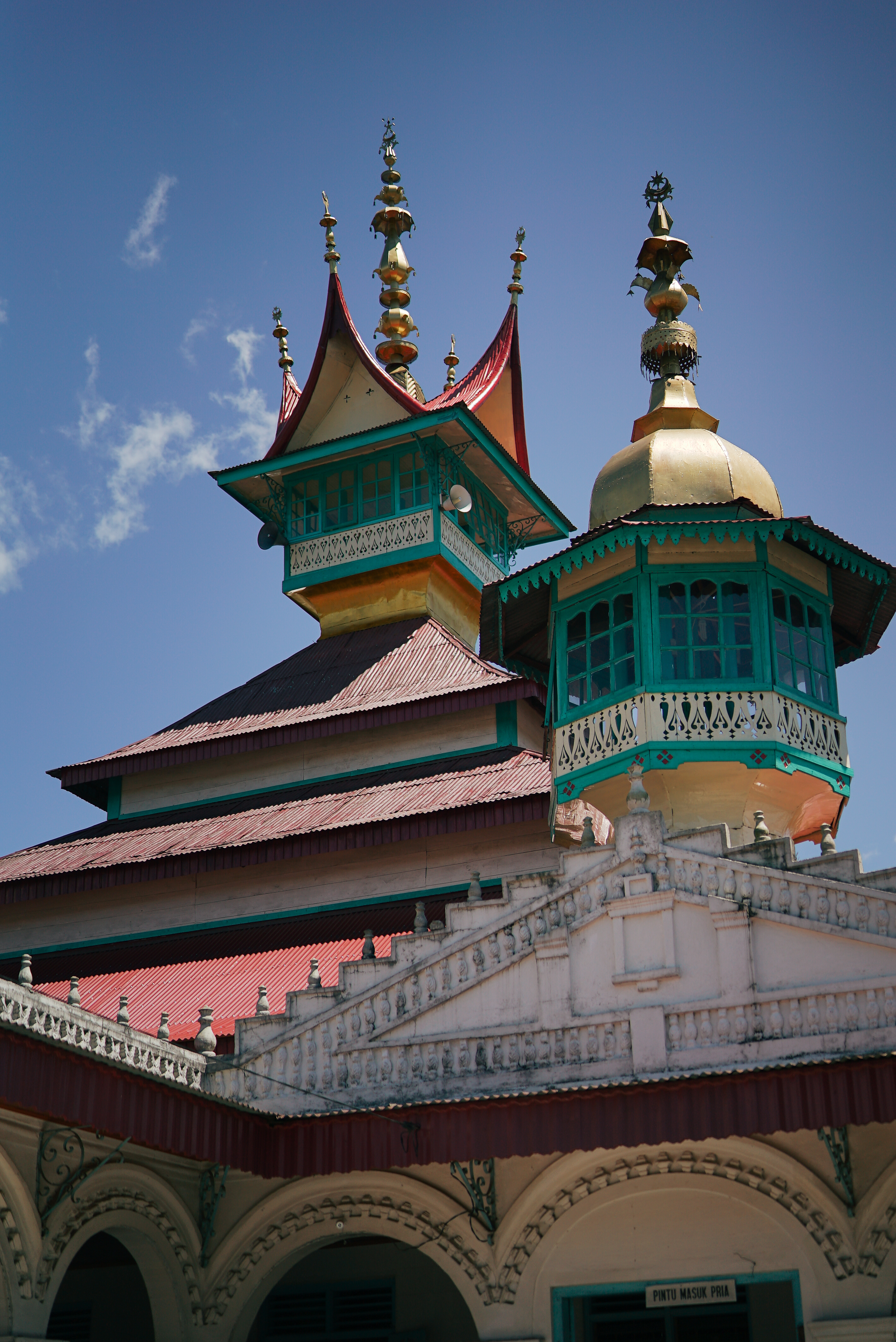

Religion
- Affiliation: Islam
- Branch/tradition: Sunni

Location
- Location: Koto Baru Nagari, Sungai Pagu District, South Solok Regency, West Sumatra, Indonesia
- Interactive map of Koto Baru Grand Mosque; Masjid Raya Koto Baru

Architecture
- Type: Mosque
- Style: Minangkabau, Persian
- Groundbreaking: 1922
- Completed: 1933
- Dome: 2

Koto Baru Grand Mosque is one of the oldest mosques in Indonesia located in Koto Baru Nagari, Sungai Pagu District, South Solok Regency, West Sumatra.

Construction of the mosque begun in 1922 with an architectural design resembling Rao Rao Mosque located in Tanah Datar Regency, which is a blend of Minangkabau with Persian style. The mosque suffered considerable damage due to the earthquake occurred in Sumatra in 1926, at which time the mosque was still under construction thus it delayed the construction until 1933.

The mosque is located not far from the area known as "Seribu Rumah Gadang Nagari", or about 37 km from Padang Aro, the capital of South Solok Regency. Nowadays, apart from being used for Islamic worshipping activities, this one-floor mosque is also used as a place for religious education for the surrounding community, and it has become one of the most popular tourist attractions in South Solok Regency.

== Architecture ==
The blend of various elements is evident in the architecture of the mosque, generally Persian and Minangkabau. Like other vernacular Minangkabau mosques, the roof of the mosque consists of several levels that are slightly concave. There is a square room with four rooftops chiming toward the four corners at the top level of the roof. According to Thamrin, the local community leaders, four gonjong symbolize the four kings of the four tribes which settled in the area of Surambi area Pagu River, namely Malay people, Kampai people, Panai people, and Tigo Lareh people, while the tower stands as tall as 1.5 meters which makes it a symbol of the four kings' belief in oneness of God.

Overall the architecture of the mosque resembles the design of Rao Rao Mosque in Tanah Datar Regency. In the 100th anniversary of Rao Rao Mosque in 2008, Shodiq Pasadigoe, the regent of Tanah Datar at the time mentioned that Kota Baru Grand Mosque was requested to be built similar to Rao Rao Mosque. Unlike Rao Rao Mosque however, this mosque has two towers, albeit its shape resembles the one of Rao Rao Mosque.

== See also ==
- Rao Rao Mosque
- List of oldest mosques in Indonesia
- Vernacular mosque architecture in Indonesia
