= Iwan Syahril =

Indonesian teacher (born 1976)

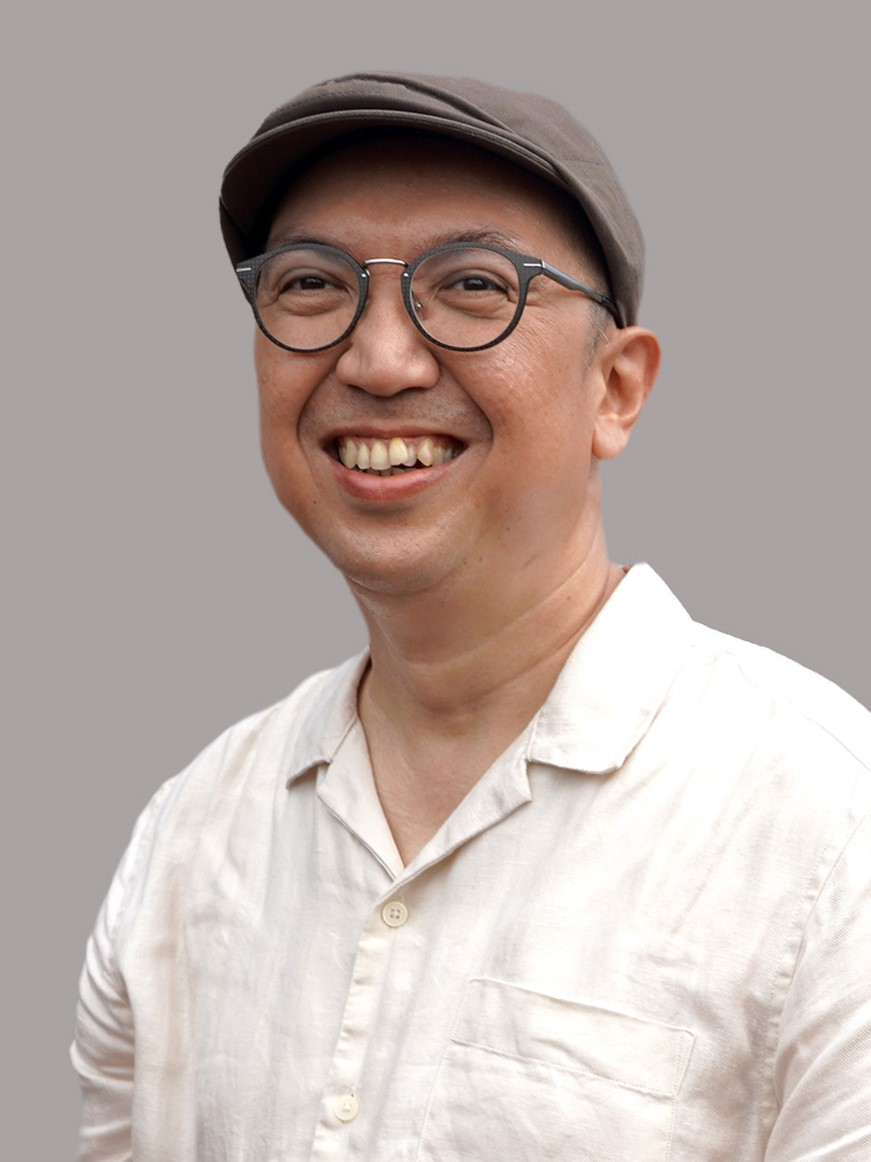

Director General for Early Childhood, Primary, and Secondary Education
- Incumbent
- Assumed office 2022

Personal details
- Born: October 26, 1976 (age 49) Padang
- Spouse: Xanty Dwi Putri
- Education: Padjadjaran University, Indonesia University of Education, Columbia University, Michigan State University

Iwan Syahril, Ph.D. is an Indonesian teacher and bureaucrat currently working in the Ministry of Primary and Secondary Education of the Republic of Indonesia as Director General for Early Childhood, Primary, and Secondary Education. He is also a lecturer at Sampoerna University and has served as Dean of the Faculty of Education. In addition, he is a researcher and co-founder of the Center for Education and Policy Studies (PSPK), a non-profit research and advocacy organization based in Jakarta.

== Early life ==
Iwan comes from a family of teachers in Padang, West Sumatra. He is the eldest son of Syahril Kasim and Syafrida, both of Minangkabau descent. His father was a well-known English teacher in Padang from the 1960s to the 1990s, and his mother comes from a farming family in Batusangkar. Many of Iwan’s relatives, including his uncles, aunts, cousins, and in-laws, are also teachers, both in civil service and honorary positions. His passion for education led him to become a teacher and focus on teacher education. After serving as the Special Staff to the Minister for Learning and as Director General of Teachers and Educational Personnel, Iwan now serves as the Director General of PAUD Dikdasmen.

== Education ==
Iwan completed his elementary to high school education in Padang. He earned his bachelor’s degree in International Relations from Padjadjaran University in Bandung in 1998. He later pursued a postgraduate program in English Education at the Indonesia University of Education. Iwan went on to earn two master’s degrees from Teachers College, Columbia University in New York: one in Secondary Education and another in Curriculum and Teaching. He also earned a Ph.D. from Michigan State University, focusing on Education Policy and Teacher Education.

== Family ==
Iwan married Xanty Dwi Putri in 2001, and they have two children: Shakila Aliyahputri Syahril and Iqra Hatta Syahril.

== Career ==
Iwan Syahril initially taught English in several formal and non-formal educational institutions from 1995 to 2005. In 1996, he was invited to become an assistant teacher at WL McLeod Elementary School in Vanderhoof, British Columbia, Canada, as part of the Indonesian Canadian Youth Exchange program.

After completing his graduate program at Columbia University, he was offered a teaching position in Scarsdale Public Schools, New York. There, he taught classes in five elementary schools, one middle school, and one high school. While pursuing his PhD at Michigan State University, Iwan taught several graduate classes and was an administrator in the Secondary Education Teacher Education Program in the College of Education.

Returning to Indonesia in 2016, he worked as a lecturer at Universitas Siswa Bangsa Internasional or now known as Sampoerna University. In addition to teaching, he has been entrusted with several positions, ranging from Coordinator of Educational Sciences, Coordinator of the Center for Learning, Teaching and Curriculum Development, Director of Institutional Research and Quality Assurance, to Dean of the Faculty of Education. He was also involved in several teacher training programs conducted by the Putera Sampoerna Foundation in various regions in Indonesia.

Among the scientific publications he has written, including the article “Teacher Training and Preparation” published in The Encyclopedia of Education Economics and Finance and the article “Globalization and Teacher Education” published in the International Handbook of Research on Teacher Education. He also wrote a chapter in the book Opportunities and Challenges of 21st Century Education with several lecturers at Sampoerna University. In 2017, Iwan was one of the team members who designed the social and personality competency teacher training for the DKI Jakarta Education Office. In 2019, Iwan joined the expert team at the National Accreditation Board for Schools and Madrasahs (BAN-SM). In addition, he has been a consultant for the United Nations Development Program (UNDP) in Jakarta in designing the SDGs Leadership Academy curriculum.

=== As director GTK ===
On May 8, 2020, Minister of Education and Culture Nadiem Makarim appointed him as Director General of Teachers and Education Personnel. After that, he also became the Chairman of the Board of Trustees of Universitas Negeri Padang (UNP) before it became a state-owned university (PTN-BH). Despite having many roles in his career, including being the current Director General of GTK, the husband of Xanty Dwi Putri has not forgotten his main profession as a teacher.

As Director General of Teachers and Education Personnel (Dirjen GTK) at the Ministry of Education, Culture, Research, and Technology (Kemendikbudristek), Iwan Syahril actively supported the strategic programs of Minister Nadiem Anwar Makarim through the "Merdeka Belajar" (Freedom to Learn) policy, especially programs directly benefiting teachers and education personnel (GTK). Iwan played a direct role in designing and initiating programs aimed at transforming education in Indonesia. He often traveled to various regions with the Minister to oversee the strategic programs of Kemendikbudristek, especially those related to teachers and education personnel. He personally listened to the aspirations of teachers in various regions, demonstrating his concern while also encouraging teachers to collaborate in improving education in Indonesia.

In his current position as Director General for Early Childhood, Primary, and Secondary Education at the Ministry of Education, Culture, Research, and Technology, Iwan has been instrumental in leading transformative changes in Indonesia's PreK-12 education system, emphasizing student-centered policies to enhance the quality of education for millions of students across the country. This requires Iwan to work with 552 autonomous local governments in a very decentralized education governance system. He has been instrumental in implementing technology-driven reforms and promoting Professional Learning Communities (PLCs) across Indonesian schools. His leadership has facilitated the establishment of over 300,000 PLCs in schools and more than 125,000 online PLCs.
