= Padang Ganting =

District of Indonesia

- District
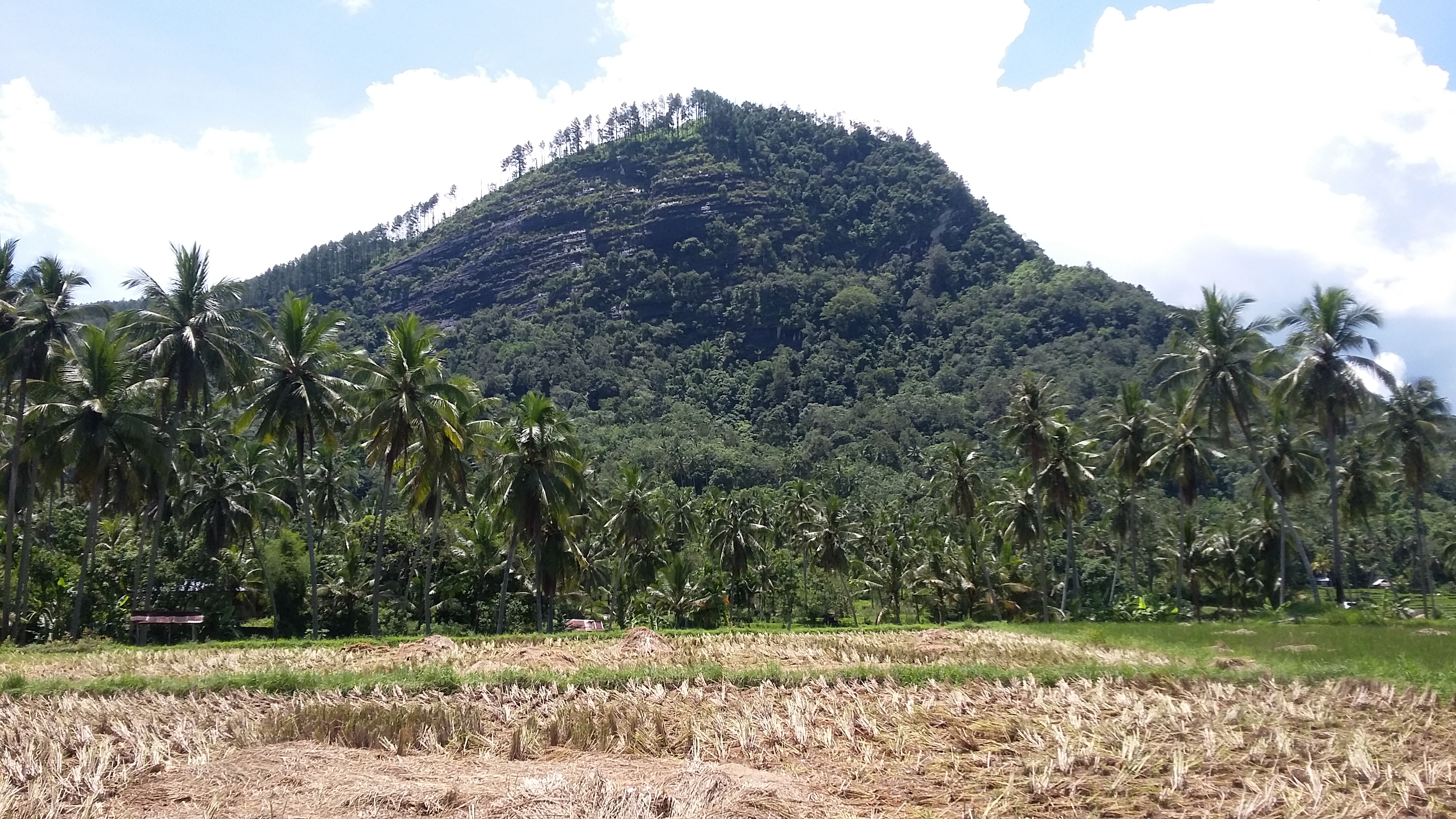
- Padang gantiang

- Location of Padang Ganting in Sumatra
- Coordinates: 0°31′37″S 100°42′39″E
- Country: Indonesia
- Province: West Sumatra
- Regency: Tanah Datar Regency

Area
  - Total: 83.5 km^{2} (32.2 sq mi)

Population (2020)
  - Total: 13,894
  - Density: 166/km^{2} (431/sq mi)
- Time zone: UTC+7 (Western Indonesia Time)

Padang Ganting is a district (kecamatan) of Tanah Datar Regency, in the West Sumatra province of Indonesia.

It is subdivided into two nagari (villages): Padang Ganting and Atar.
