= Rao Rao Mosque =

Mosque in Tanah Datar, West Sumatra, Indonesia

Rao Rao Mosque Masjid Rao Rao
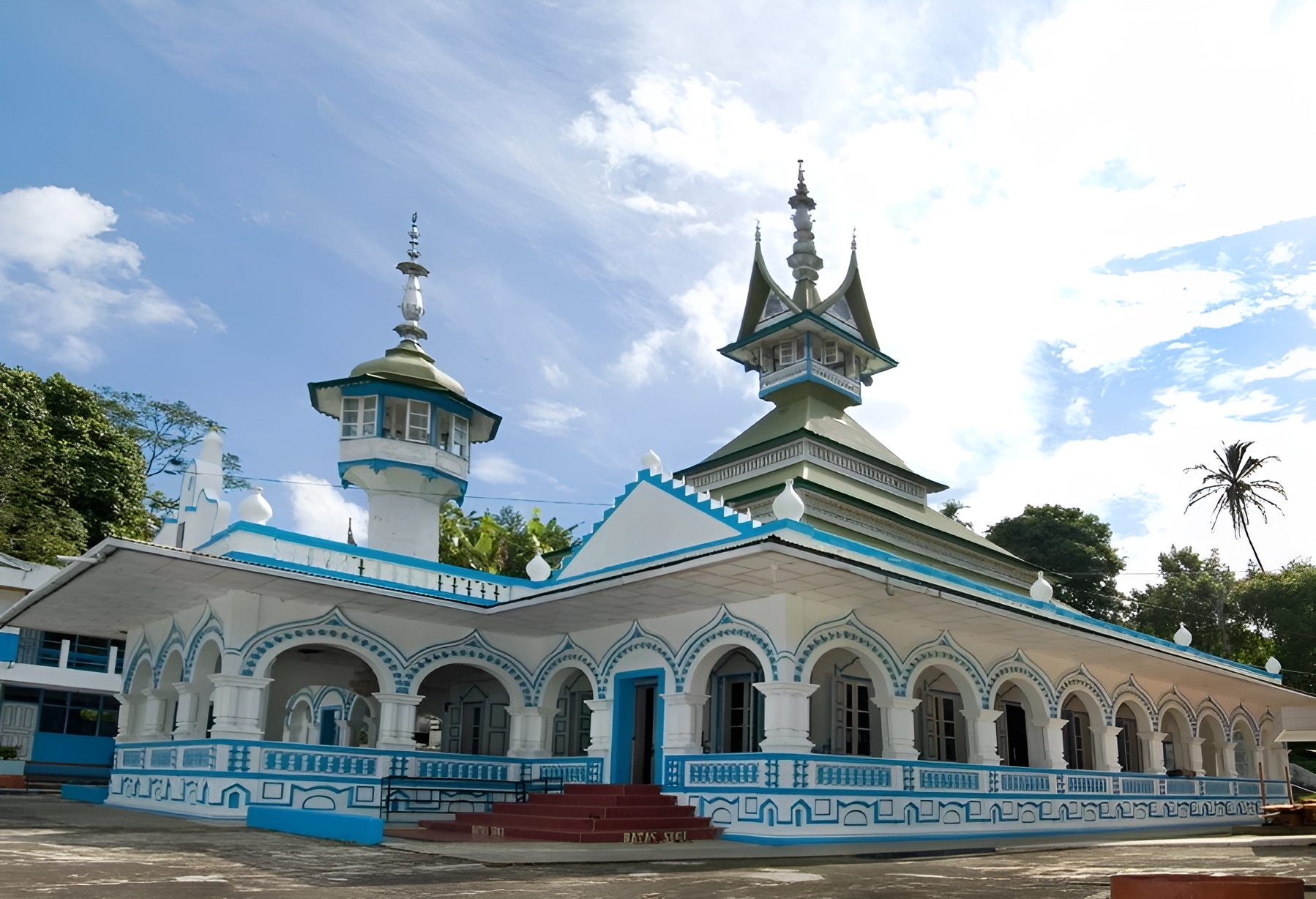
- Rao Rao Mosque in October 2008

- Location within Sumatra Location within Indonesia

Religion
- Affiliation: Islam
- Branch/tradition: Sunni

Location
- Location: Nagari Rao Rao, Sungai Tarab, Tanah Datar Regency, West Sumatra, Indonesia
- Interactive map of Rao Rao Mosque; Masjid Rao Rao
- Coordinates: 0.37369°S 100.55508°E

Architecture
- Type: Mosque
- Style: Minangkabau, Persian
- Groundbreaking: 1908
- Completed: 1918
- Minaret: 1

Rao Rao Mosque is one of the oldest mosques in Indonesia located in Nagari Rao Rao, Tarab River, Tanah Datar Regency, West Sumatra. It is located on the road from Batusangkar bound to Bukittinggi, precisely in Rao Rao. This mosque of Minangkabau and Persian architecture was built in 1908 with a roof made from fibers before being changed to zinc.

Since its foundation, the mosque has suffered significant damage due to earthquakes, as in 1926 and 2009. But since its construction, the mosque has never been massively restored. The renovations that have been made are only repair of tilting of the minaret in 1975 and the replacement of all the old ceramics with the new one around the 1990s.

Currently, apart from being used for Islamic worship activities, this one-floor mosque is also used as a place of religious education. Previously, the mosque was also used as a strategy center during the Indonesian War of Independence against the Dutch colonial rule.

== History ==
The mosque was built in 1908 as a replacement for the Atap Ijuk Mosque in Rao Rao, which was demolished due to the unfeasible condition of the building. Thereafter, on the land of waqf (endowment) by H. Mohammad Thaib Caniago, the mosque was built jointly by the Nagari Rao Rao community on the initiative of Abdurrachman Datuk Majo Indo. Construction was completed by the end of 1918.

== Architecture ==
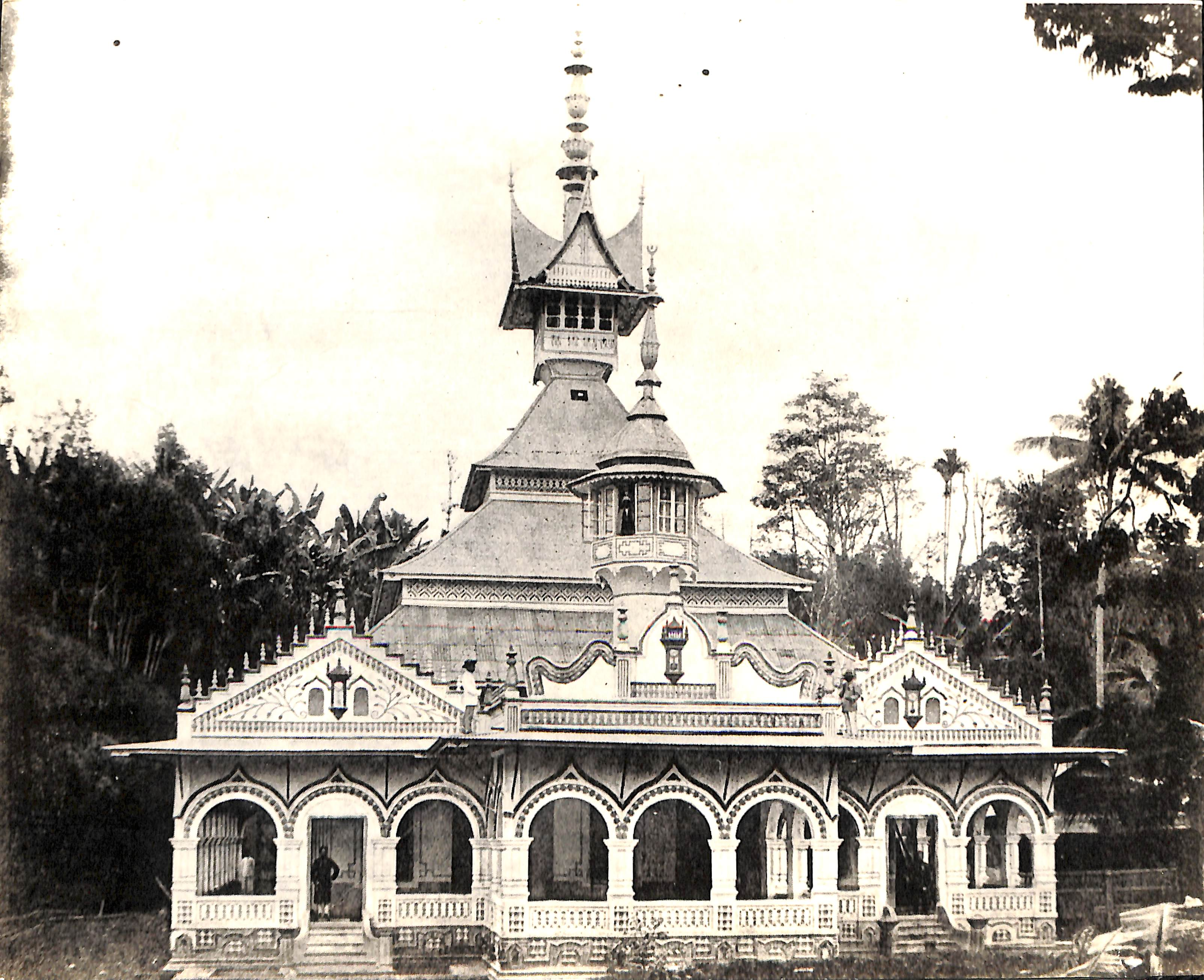
Rao Rao Mosque, 1924

Architectural style of the mosque is a blend of various elements, mostly Minangkabau and Persian. Resembling to other Minangkabau mosques, roof of the mosque consists of four layers that are slightly curved, and there is a square room with four rooftops gilded toward the four corners of the wind at the top level of the roof, while there is a large space with the domes in the minaret.

Inside the prayer hall, four main pillars made of concrete stand. There is a newer section of the mosque which was built in the 1930s, decorated with ornaments of broken glass. The minbar has an area of 3 × 1.38 meters.

In the 100th anniversary of the Rao Rao Mosque in October 2008, Shodiq Pasadigoe, the regent of Tanah Datar at that time, said there were two other mosques throughout West Sumatra that resembled this mosque because it was asked to be built similarly, namely the Mosque of Saadah which is also located in Tarab River, Tanah Datar Regency and Koto Baru Grand Mosque in Pagu River, South Solok Regency.

== Related building ==
There is a two-story building measuring 7 x 10 m standing to the left of the mosque. The building called "Markaz" was completed in 2001. Meanwhile, there is a building used as a religious school to the right of the mosque as well, which had changed its name to "Darul Huda" since 1982 (formerly Madrasah Islamiyah).

== See also ==
- Koto Baru Grand Mosque
- List of oldest mosques in Indonesia
- Vernacular mosque architecture in Indonesia
