= Tambo Minangkabau =

Minangkabau historical and legendary literary work

Tambo Minangkabau (or colloquially simplified as Tambo) is one of the Sumatran historical literary work that also contains legends related to the origin of ethnic groups, lands, their communities, villages, tradition and nature of the Minangkabau people up to the region of Lampung. The Minangkabau tambo is written in Minangkabau in the form of prose. In Minangkabau tradition, tambo is a heritage passed down orally from generation to generation.

The earliest tambo manuscripts in Minangkabau were written in Arabic script using the Minangkabau language. Latin-script versions appeared only in the early 20th century, comparing the stories with some historical records. A total of 83 manuscripts have been found.Their titles vary, including Undang‑Undang Minangkabau, Tambo Adat, Adat Istiadat Minangkabau, Kitab Kesimpanan Adat lan Undhang‑Undhang, Undhang‑Undhang Luhak Tiga Laras, and Undhang‑Undhang Adat.

There are two main types of Minangkabau tambo: Tambo alam – tells the origin of ancestors and the Minangkabau kingdom. Tambo adat – tells about customs, political systems, and laws of the Minangkabau people from the past.

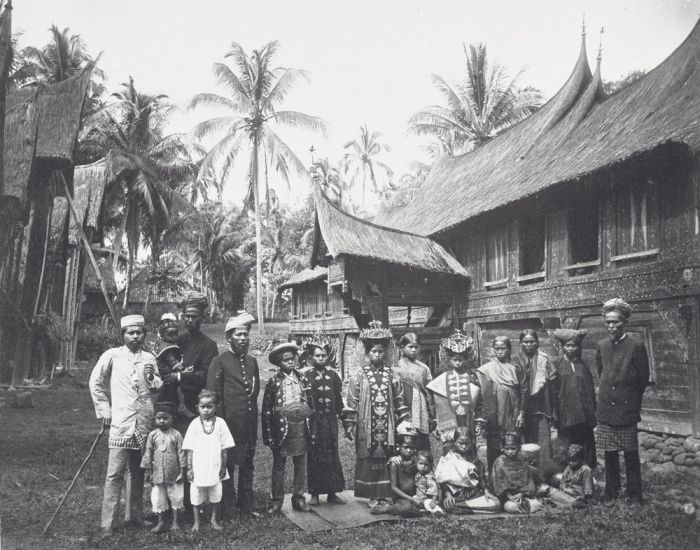
A portrait of a Minangkabau family from the past, related to the literary tradition of Tambo Minangkabau.

== Etymology ==
The word tambo tracing back to Proto-Austronesian (Proto-Malayo-Polynesian), with the general meaning of "beginning," equivalent to the other kinship terms tambai (old malay), tarombo (batak), matembai (kawi), tembey in the Sundanese language. The words tambo can also mean history, chronicle, or legend. It has the same meaning as babad in Javanese or Sundanese.

== Editions ==
The tambo was first found in Minangkabau language written in Arabic script. Writing in Latin script was only known from the early 20th century, which compared some historical evidence. Most Minangkabau tambo manuscripts were written in Arabic-Sumatran system (Jawi), and a few were written in Latin script. There are 83 known manuscripts. Their titles vary, for example Undang-Undang Minang, Tambo Adat, Adat Istiadat Minang, Kitab Kesimpanan Adat dan Undang-Undang, Undang-Undang Luhak Tiga Laras, and Undang-Undang Adat.

The Minangkabau tambo is mainly divided into two parts:

- Tambo alam, which tells the origin of ancestors and about the kingdom in Minangkabau.
- Tambo adat, which tells about customs, government systems, and laws of Minangkabau government in the past.

The stories in tambo are usually not systematic, and sometimes the stories change to fit the needs and situation, so the contents can change depending on the listener’s wishes. Generally, Minangkabau tambo is an adapted work, where the adaptors do not mention their sources, making it seem like their own work. There are 47 original Minangkabau tambo manuscripts stored in libraries abroad, 10 of them are in the National Library in Jakarta, while the others are adaptations without known original authors.

=== Tambo Ranah Minangkabau – the realm ===
Long ago, there was a king named Iskandar Zulkarnain from Makadunia, in the continent of Ruhum. King Iskandar conquered many lands until he reached Tanah Basa and then a peaceful kingdom. There, he married an Indian princess and had three sons, estimated around the 7th century AD.

"Manuruik Warih nan bajawek, pusako nan ditolong, ado usuanyo kalu dikaji, iyo di dalam tambo lamo, sapiah balahan tigo jurai"

Iskandar Zulkarnain died, and in his will, he ordered his three sons to sail east to Langkapuri Island in Negeri Sembilan. But halfway near Sailan Island, the first and second sons wanted to own the royal crown, a golden symbol of the kingdom’s unity. In their fight, the crown fell into the sea, where it was wrapped by a giant snake called Ular Bidai (Luday).

Many relatives tried to get the crown back but died because of the snake. The king’s adviser, Cati Bilang Pandai, had an idea. He ordered servants to bring Camin Taruih, a magic mirror that could catch the crown’s reflection underwater. Then he asked the best blacksmith to make a copy of the crown and killed the blacksmith after it was done.

The fake crown was given to the youngest son. When the two older brothers woke up, they were shocked to see their youngest brother wearing the crown. A fight happened, and the three brothers separated. The oldest son returned to Ruhum and became king with the title Sri Maharaja Alif. The second son went to China and became king with the title Sri Maharaja Dipang. The youngest son, titled Sri Maharaja Diraja, continued traveling southeast to the island of Java Alkibri.

His ship was hit by a storm and drifted for weeks. The passengers were desperate, with almost no food left. Fortunately, they saw a small land like a duck egg in the distance—an island called Sumatra. Sri Maharaja Diraja ordered his men to row to the island. They landed at Labuhan Si Tembaga, and the island was named Sirangkak Nan Badangkang because it looked like a crab. The blood of Maharaja Diraja’s eldest son, Raja Nusirwan, flowed through the land, along with other important figures.

The ship was damaged. The king said whoever could fix the ship would marry one of his daughters. Four guards took the task: Harimau Campo, Anjing Mualim, Kambing Hutan, and Kucing Siam. They built a settlement called Lagundi nan Baselo.

The island was the top of a mountain, Mount Marapi, which was still flooded by ancient floods. Thanks to God's power, the water gradually went down, revealing new land. An expedition cleared the forest to build a new settlement. In the new settlement, customs were written down, and the king ruled fairly. People were happy, and culture and children's games grew. The village became known as Nagari Pariangan.

Over time, Pariangan’s population grew, and it became crowded. A warrior named Datuak Bandaro Kayo searched for a new place. He cleared the forest with a long sword, and the new area was called Nagari Padang Panjang.

A Minangkabau saying tells: "Dari mano titiak palito, dibaliak telong nan batali, dari mano turun niniak moyang kito, dari lereng gunuang marapi bukik seguntang-guntang"

Hyang Dipatuan Sri Maharaja Diraja married Puti Indo Jelito, and they had a son named Datu' Katumanggungan. After Sri Maharaja Diraja died, Puti Indo Jelito married the king’s adviser, Cati Bilang Pandai. They had six children: Datu' Parpatiah Nan Sabatang, Datu' Siri Dirajo, Puti Reno Gadis, Puti Reno Judah, Puti Ambun Suri, and Puti Jamilan.

When Pariangan and Padang Panjang became crowded, a new expedition expanded the land. Datu' Katumanggungan led the group that founded Luhak Tanah Datar. Datu' Parpatiah Nan Sabatang founded Luhak Agam. The third area, Luhak Limo Puluah Koto, was founded by Datu' Sri Maharajo Nan Banego-nego. These three areas are called Luhak Nan Tigo.

=== Islamic-influenced Tambo (Adaik-based) ===
Minangkabau customs have 4 parts:

1. Adaik Nan Sabana Adaik: The original customs that do not fade or change, such as Islamic law in daily life. This custom is "babuhua mati" (cannot be changed).
2. Adaik Nan Diadaikkan: Customs like matrilineal descent, where clan membership is passed from mother to children, leadership is passed from maternal uncles to nephews, and high heirlooms pass from mother to daughter. This custom is also "babuhua mati" (cannot be changed).
3. Adaik Nan Taradaik: Customs in ceremonies like choosing leaders, weddings, etc. These customs are "babuhua sentak" (can change with time or needs).
4. Adat Istiadaik: Habits in art, sports, and other community activities. These customs are "babuhua sentak" (can change with time or needs).
