= Pagaruyung Palace =

Pagaruyung Royal Palace
- Istano Basa Pagaruyuang (Minangkabau)
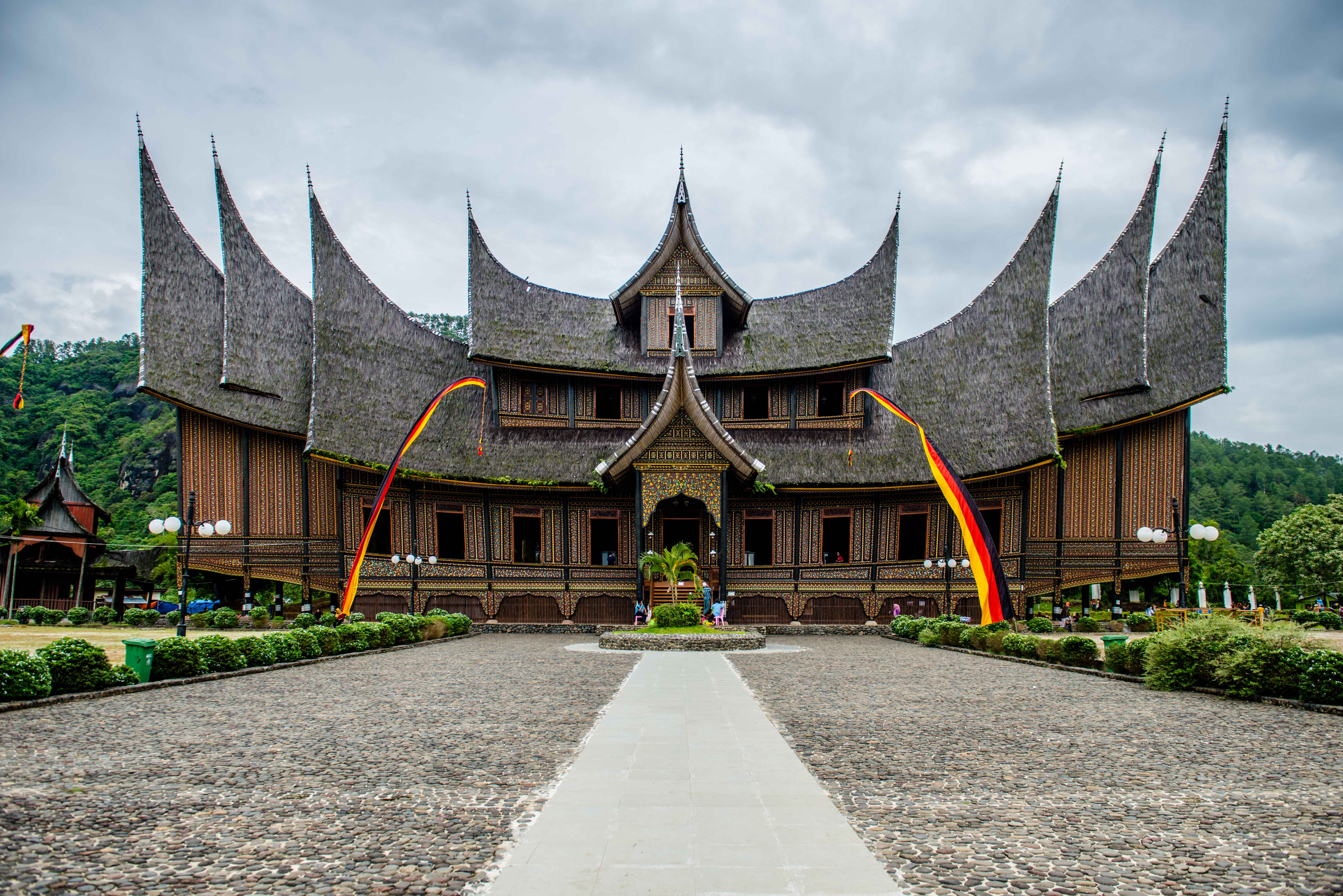
- The new palace, built after the 2007 fire

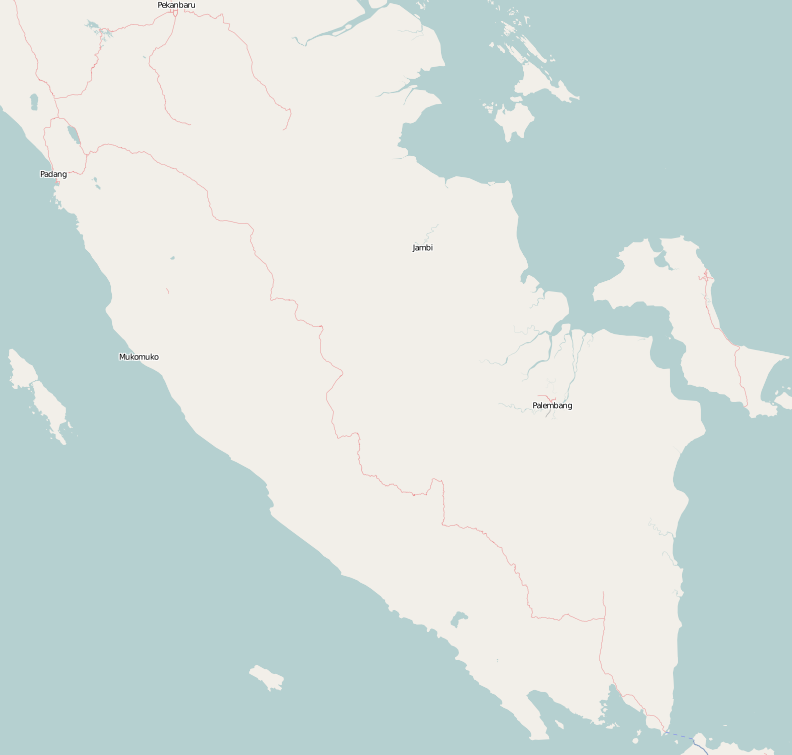
- Location within Southern Sumatra
- 0°26′22″S 100°40′9″E
- Location: Batusangkar, West Sumatra, Indonesia

History
- Built: 17th century
- Built for: Residence of Pagaruyung Kingdom royal family
- Demolished: 1837 (due to war); 1966 (due to fire); 2007 (due to fire)
- Rebuilt: 1930, 1968, 2007

Site notes
- Architectural style: Minangkabau traditional house
- Owner: Government of Tanah Datar Regency

Pagaruyung Palace (Minangkabau: Istano Basa Pagaruyuang) is the istana (royal palace) of the former Pagaruyung Kingdom, located in Tanjung Emas subdistrict near Batusangkar town, Tanah Datar Regency, West Sumatra, Indonesia. It was built in the traditional Minangkabau Rumah Gadang vernacular architectural style but had several atypical elements including a three-story structure and a larger dimension in comparison to common rumah gadang.

Since the Pagaruyung Kingdom was disbanded in 1833, no king or royal family resides in the palace today, but it is still held in high esteem among Minangkabau people, as the descendants of scattered Minang nobles (bangsawan) still find roots and links to the former royal house of Pagaruyung. The palace has been destroyed by fire several times, in 1804, 1966, and 2007. It has been rebuilt again and today functions as a museum and popular tourist attraction.

== Architecture ==
The original Pagaruyung palace was built entirely from timber masonry, however, the current building frame was built using a modern concrete structure. Nevertheless, the Istano Basa Pagaruyung was quite faithfully restored using traditional techniques and materials adorned with 60 carvings that signify Minang philosophy and culture.

The palace has three stories with 72 pillars and the typical Rumah Gadang gonjong, a horn-like curved roof made from 26 tons of black ijuk aren palm fibers. The palace is also furnished with over 100 replicas of Minang antique furniture and artifacts, aiming the palace to be revived as Minangkabau cultural center as well as a tourism attraction in West Sumatra.

== History ==
The original Pagaruyung palace was built on Batu Patah Hill and was burned down during a riot in the Padri War in 1804. The palace was rebuilt but was destroyed again by a fire in 1966. The building was then rebuilt again in 1976 as a replica of the original Pagaruyung Palace. It was built after the suppression of the Revolutionary Government of the Republic of Indonesia (PRRI) movement in 1958, which was based in West Sumatra. Then-West Sumatra governor Harun Zen initiated the construction of the Istano Basa Pagaruyung in 1976 as a way of reviving the flagging pride of the Minang community after the suppression. The restoration of the palace was marked with the erection of tunggak tuo (main columns) on 27 December 1976 by West Sumatra Governor Harun Zain. After completion, the palace has become well-known to the public as a museum and tourist attraction. This building was not built on the original site but moved south from the original site.

The palace was destroyed by fire on the evening of February 27, 2007, after the roof was struck by lightning. It was estimated that only 15 percent of the valuable artifacts survived the fire. Today the surviving artifacts are stored in Balai Benda Purbakala Kabupaten Tanah Datar (Archaeology Authority of Tanah Datar Regency). The pusaka or heirloom of the Pagaruyung Kingdom was stored in Silinduang Bulan Palace located about 2 kilometers from Pagaruyung Palace. Restoration of the building took six years and an estimated RP20 billion (US$1,71 million) to complete. The building was completed and inaugurated by Indonesian President Susilo Bambang Yudhoyono in October 2013.

== See also ==
- Rumah gadang
- Minangkabau
- Architecture of Indonesia
- Architecture of Sumatra
