= Balairung =

Village hall of the Minangkabau people of West Sumatra, Indonesia

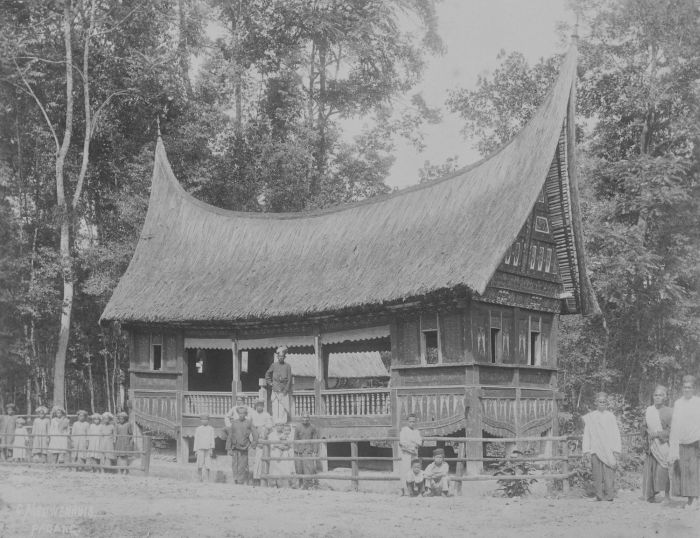
A balairung in Matur

A balairung is a village hall of the Minangkabau people of West Sumatra, Indonesia. It has a similar architectural form to the rumah gadang, the domestic architecture of the Minangkabau people. Whereas a rumah gadang is a proper building, the balairung is a pavilion-like structure used solely for holding a consensus decision-making process in the Minang society.

== Etymology ==
According to the Minangkabau Dictionary, a balairung is a building where a decision-making consensus is held, led by the chief (penghulu) of the adat society (ninik mamak). Balairung is derived from the words balai ("pavilion") and rung ("building"), referring to the traditional pavilion-like wooden architecture of the building.

The term balairung has been incorporated into the Indonesian language in general. The Great Dictionary of the Indonesian Language defines the balairung as a balai ("pavilion") or a large pendapa where the king meets with his people (bangsal kencana is the Yogyakarta-Surakarta equivalent). In modern times, any kind of hall was named balairung, e.g., the balairung building of the University of Indonesia, which is the main hall of the university and the largest building in the campus.

== Architecture ==
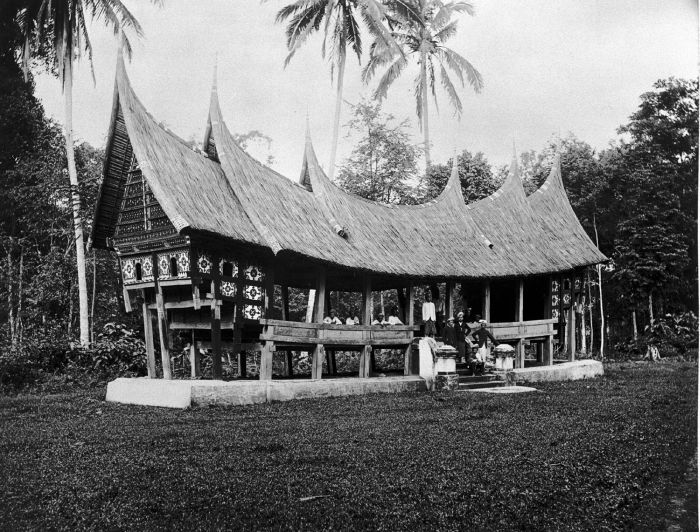
A wall-less balairung in Batipuh.

A balairung has the same form as a rumah gadang, employing a dramatic curved roof structure with multi-tiered, upswept gables. Similar to the rumah gadang, balairung is designed as a raised stage house, supported by posts. and its walls (if they exist) are similarly decorated with carvings of painted floral patterns.

The main difference between a balairung and a rumah gadang is that the layout of the interior is not divided into rooms; instead, it is designed as one room as a whole used for a communal function. Consequently, a balairung lacks panels for the door and shutters for the windows. Many balairungs do not have a wall at all. With no wall, more people can join the meeting from the outside of the balairung. Access to a balairung is provided by a single portal in the middle of the building, linked to the ground with a staircase.

A balairung may be built with an anjung, a kind of raised platform at the two ends of the balairung building. This raised platform is where the penghulu pucuak should be seated. Some balairungs are built with the floor situated at the same level, lacking the anjung. In other types of balairung, such as the balairung koto piliang, the middle part of the building contains no floor, allowing the horse of the penghulu to pass through. The part where the floor disappears is known as labuan gajah.

== Function ==
The balairung is a wooden building where the group of chiefs, or penghulu, collected under the name of ninik mamak, leading a meeting to solve village affairs. According to its function, a balairung can be divided into two types: the balai saruang and the balai pasujian. A balai saruang is used to hold meetings which resolve disputes or give punishment to a person. The balai pasujian (a pavilion to prepare) is a platform where a mutual consultation is held before implementing new laws in the village.

A balairung can only be built in a village that has already received the nagari status (administrative village). Therefore, the balairung acts as a kind of town hall for the village.

== See also ==
- Rumah gadang
- Architecture of Sumatra
- Architecture of Indonesia
