= Fort van der Capellen =

Coordinates: 0.454571°S 100.596093°E

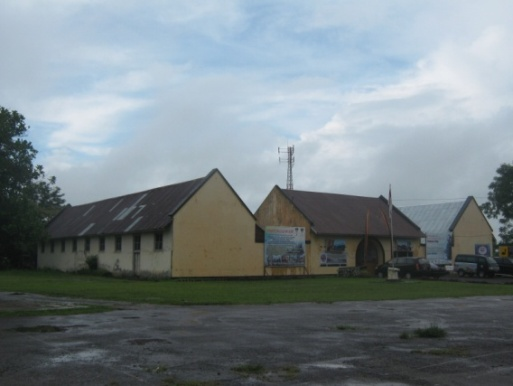
Fort van der Capellen in 2017

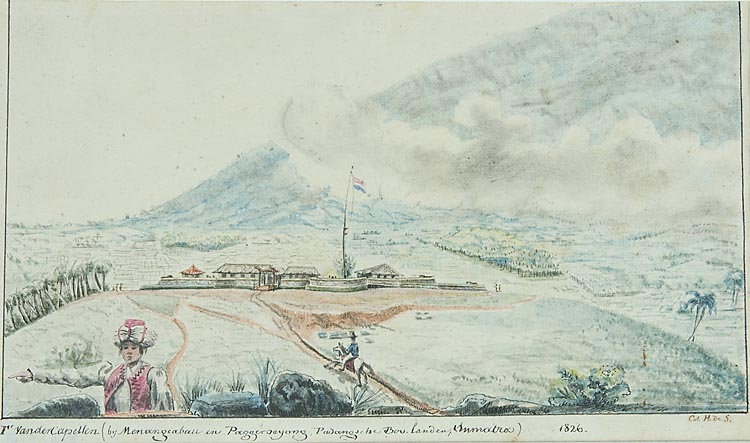
Fort van der Capellen in 1826

Fort van der Capellen is a small 19th-century Dutch fort in Batusangkar, West Sumatra, Indonesia. The town of Batusangkar grew considerably around the Fort van der Capellen. The fort was named after the Governor-General of the Dutch East Indies Godert van der Capellen.

== History ==
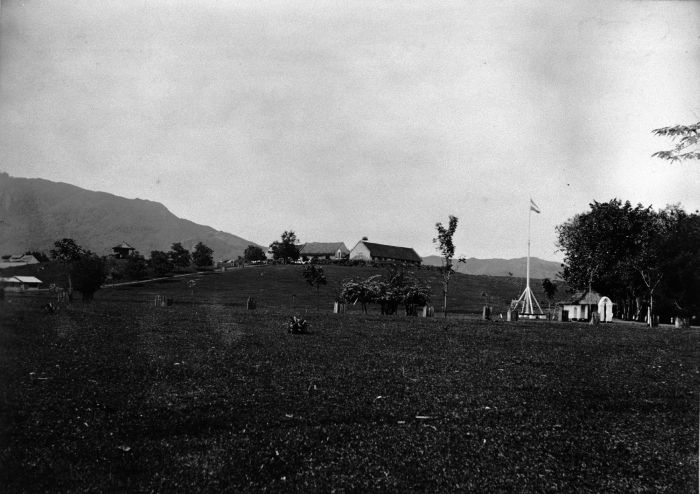
Fort van der Capellen circa 1895.

The fort is one of the forts established by the Dutch during the period of war between the so-called Padris and the so-called Adats. The Padris were Minangkabau Muslim clerics who studied in Saudi Arabia, inspired by Wahabism, and decided to impose this sharia among the indigenous people of Minangkabau. The adats on the other hand consisted of Minangkabau nobility and chiefs who were loyal to the highly syncretic interpretation of Islam which had intermingled with the traditional adat or customary law; such as the practice of maternalism, which is against the principle of Wahabism. The adats asked for help from the Dutch who intervened in 1821 and helped the nobility to defeat the Padris.

It began with Dutch Colonel Raff entering the territory of Tanah Datar. In the city of Batusangkar, the Dutch decided to establish a fort on the highest ground around 500 meters from the city center. The construction of the fort was finished in 1824. The fort was christened Van der Capellen after the Governor-General of the Dutch East Indies at that time Baron van der Capellen. It is a small fort with a 75-centimeter-thick (30 in) and 4-meter-high (13 ft) wall.

During the Japanese occupation, the fort was under the control of the Indonesian military corps the Badan Keamanan Rakjat ("People's Security Corps") from 1943 to 1945. After the declaration of Indonesian independence, the Tentara Keamanan Rakyat ("People's Security Army") was set up in the fort from 1945 to 1947. These military bodies were the predecessors of the Indonesian National Army. The Dutch briefly captured the fort from 1948 to 1950 during the controversial Operation Kraai.

In the fully-fledged independent Indonesia, the fort was used by the university body PTPG Batusangkar — the predecessor of the State University of Padang — for educational purposes, the inauguration was enacted by Mohammad Yamin.

In 1955, when PTPG Batusangkar was transferred to Bukit Gombak, the fort was converted into a military headquarters of the Angkatan Perang Republik Indonesia. During the rebellion from the Revolutionary Government of the Republic of Indonesia toward the central government in 1957, Fort van der Capellen was captured by Battalion 439 Diponegoro, which was later transferred to the Indonesian National Police on May 25, 1960. The fort was made the headquarters of the Police Resort Command until year 2001 when the headquarters was transferred to a new building in Pagaruyung.

== The fort ==
The original clay tile roof has been replaced with corrugated steel in 1974. Additional rooms were added in 1984 for a kindergarten. The dry moat has been refilled in 1986. The last changes in the building occurred in 1988 with the additional storage buildings and a dining area.

In 2008 parts of the fort were restored by the Archaeological Heritage Preservation body.

== See also ==
- Fort de Kock
