= Batu Batikam =

Historical object in Sumatra, Indonesia

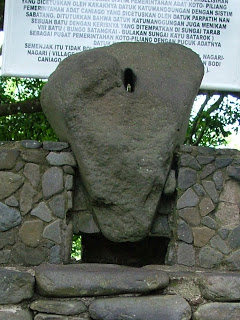
Batikam stone is a historical object for Minangkabaunes

Batikam Stone is a historical megalithic site located in Jorong Dusun Tuo, Nagari Limo Kaum, Tanah Datar Regency, Sumatra in Indonesia. Translated from Indonesian, Batu Batikam means the stone being stabbed.

According to legend, the hole in the stone was created when the stone was stabbed by Datuk Parpatih Nan Sabatang. The largest stone of this culture, Batikam Stone is 1.8 meters. It was previously used as a "medan nan bapaneh" or the place where the leader makes decisions. The formation of the stones around Batikam stone resemble a square of chairs with their backs turned. In the middle, there is the Batikam stone of Andes rocks. The stones are roughly 55 x 20 x 40 centimeters, with an appearance resembling a triangle. The Batikam stone acts as a piece of evidence for the existence of a Minangkabau kingdom in the Neolithic era. Batikam stone is a pierced stone which symbolizes the importance of peace and discussion in Minangkabau society.

== See also ==
- List of individual rocks
