= Pariangan =

Coordinates: 0°25′59.15″S 100°30′17.96″E

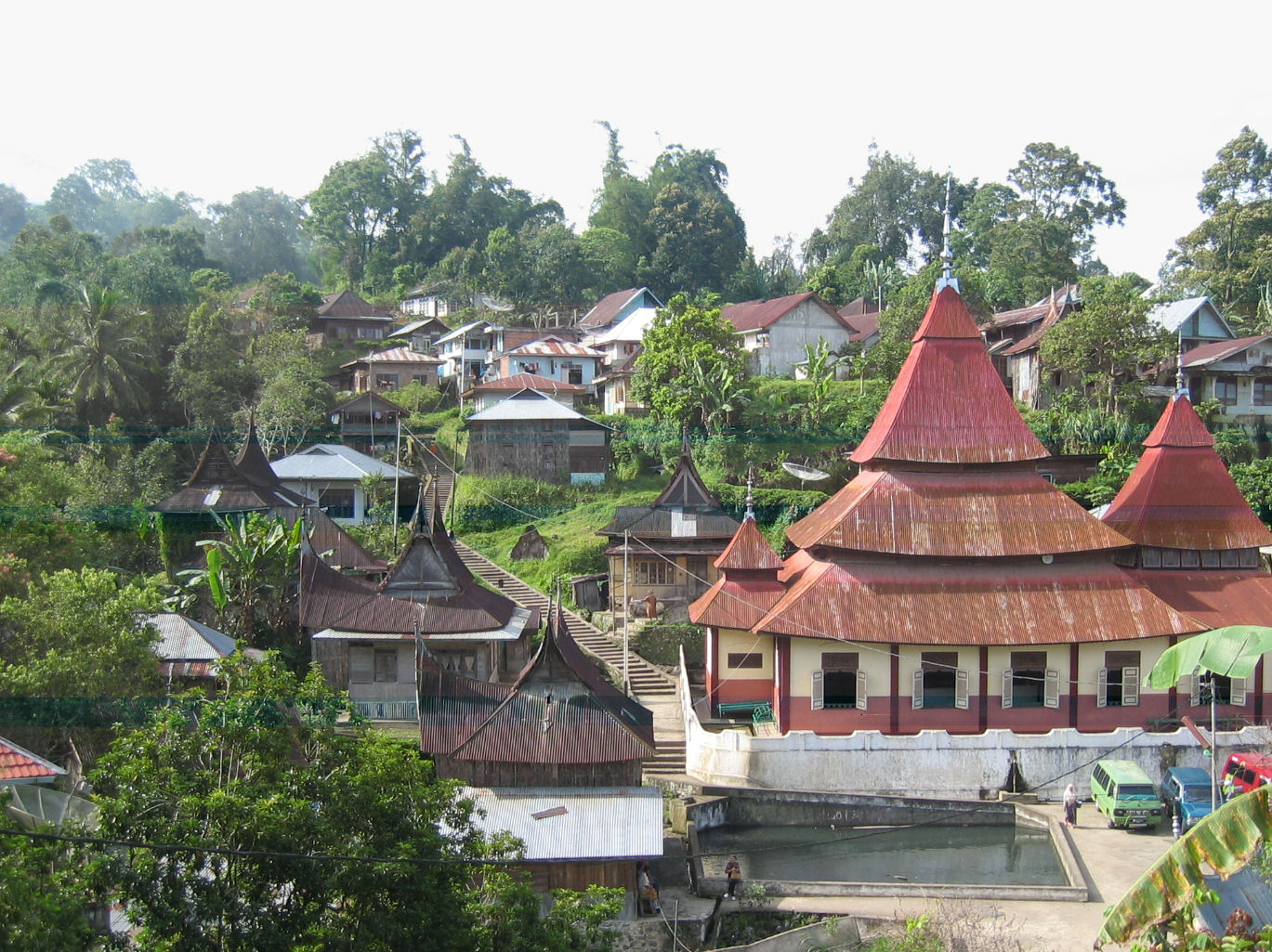
Pariangan village

Pariangan is a Minangkabau village located in the regency of Tanah Datar, West Sumatra province, Indonesia. The village is located on the lower slopes of Mount Marapi, a highly active volcano, at a distance of fifteen kilometres from the market town of Batu Sangkar. Despite its size, the village is of great cultural and historical significance to the Minangkabau people.

== History ==
Local legend states that Pariangan is the oldest of all Minangkabau villages. A large ancient tomb in the village is said to belong to Tantejo Gurhano, an early ruler. Today the whole village is preserved as a cultural monument under national legislation.

== Architecture and design ==
Pariangan is one of the best-preserved traditional Minangkabau villages, containing many 'rumah gadang' traditional houses. The oldest of these are said to be three hundred years old and feature beautiful wood-carving and walls woven from rattan. The town also features a 'surau', a communal living quarters for unmarried males, one of very few surviving examples of such a structure. The centrepiece of the town today is a large traditional mosque said to date back to the beginning of the nineteenth century. It is believed to be the oldest Minangkabau mosque in existence. Alongside the mosque today are the hot springs where communal bathing continues as it has for centuries.
