= Nagari (settlement) =

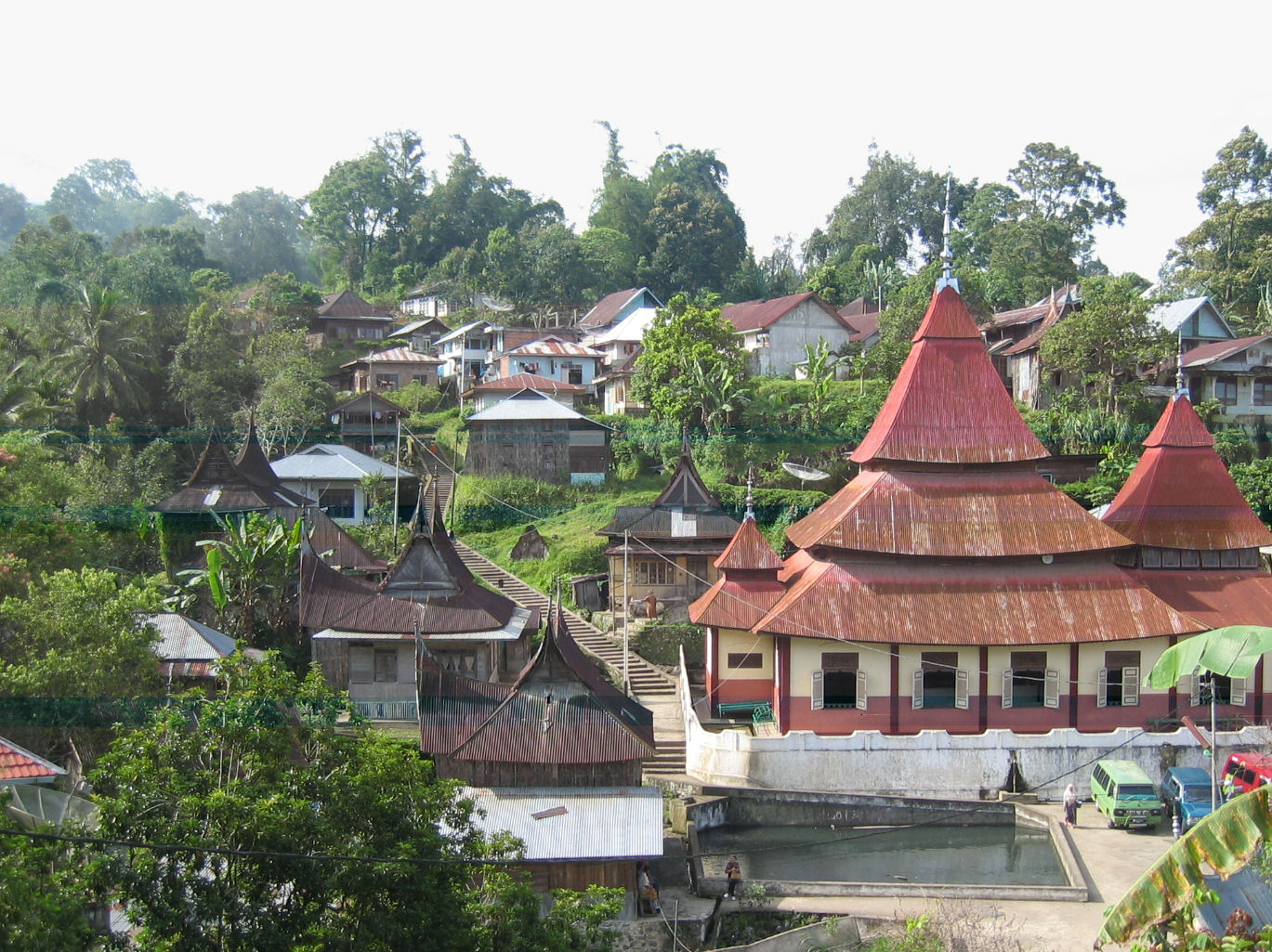
Nagari Pariangan, located on the slopes of Mount Marapi

A nagari is a historical Minangkabau geographic polity in West Sumatra (and formerly Negeri Sembilan in the Malay Peninsular west coast) comprising several matrilineal clans (suku). Since the independence of Indonesia in 1945, which covers the Sumatran Minang homelands, nagari has also lent itself as a modern semi-autonomous regional administrative unit.

From 1983-1999, the national government attempted to apply the Javanese desa village system to other ethnic groups throughout Indonesia, and in 1983 the traditional Minangkabau nagari village units were split into smaller jorong units, with some disruption to traditional nagari-centred social and cultural institutions. However following restoration of the role of the nagari in rural Minangkabau society after 1999 residence and employment in a nagari is still an aspect of social identity, just as residence in the smaller jorong, or membership of a clan.

== Etymology ==
Nagari comes from the Sanskrit word nagarī (नगरी) which means land or realm.

== History ==
The nagari system already existed before the Dutch colonial times as "autonomous village republics" in Minangkabau society. The nagari comprises five fundamental institutions: it must have roads, (berlebuh), bathing place (bertapian), meeting hall (berbalai), mosque (bermesjid) and central square (bergelanggang).

== See also ==
- Minangkabau
- Negeri Sembilan
- Rumah Gadang
- Surau
- Kampong
- Villages of Indonesia
