= Rumah Gadang =

Traditional homes of the Minangkabau in Sumatra, Indonesia

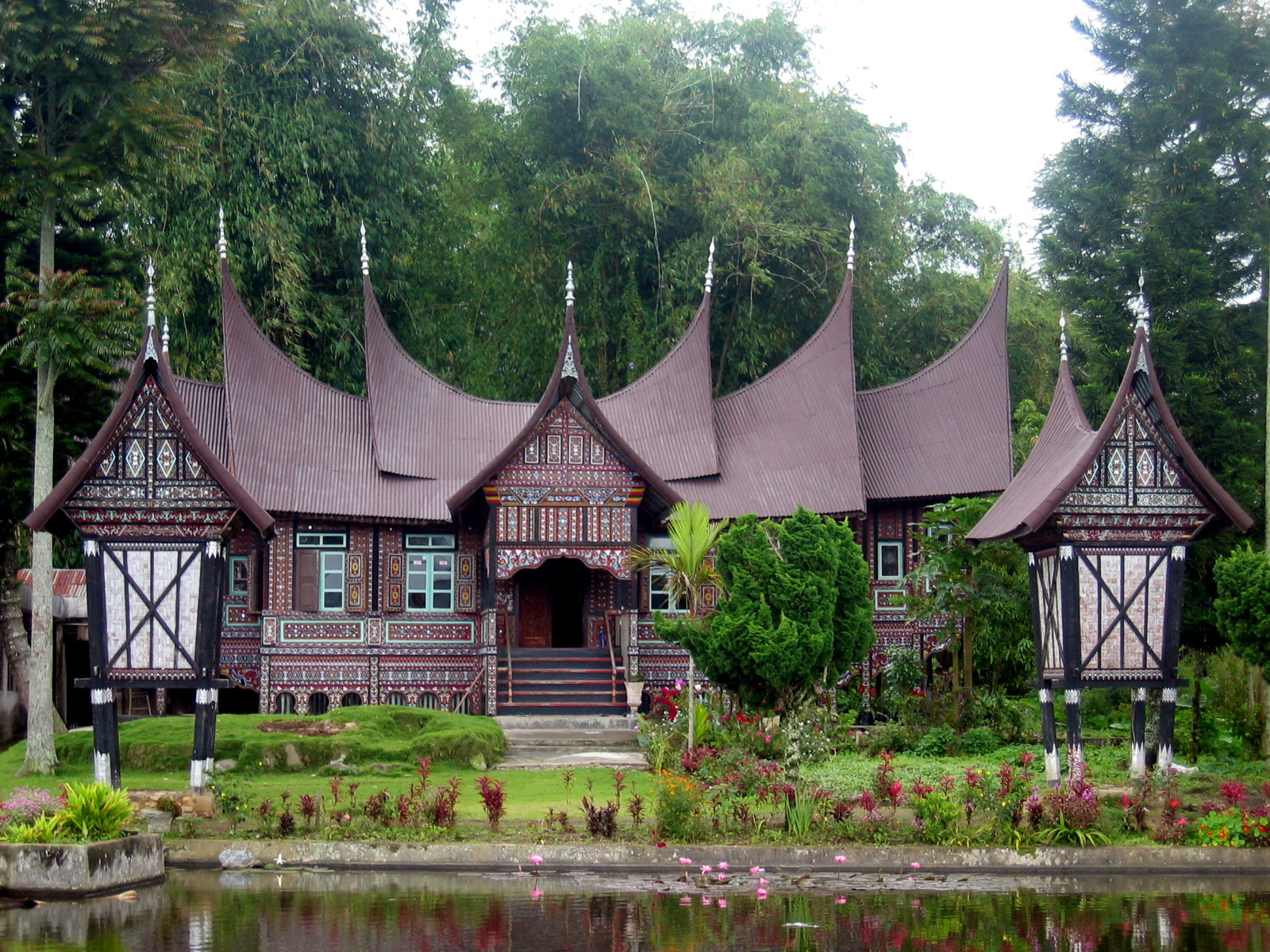
- Rumah gadang in the Pandai Sikek village of West Sumatra, with two rice barns (rangkiang) in front
- Alternative names: Rumah Adat Rumah Gadang, Rumah Adat Rumah Bagonjong

General information
- Status: Residences
- Type: Traditional House
- Architectural style: Indonesian
- Location: West Sumatra, Indonesia
- Owner: Minangkabau

Rumah Gadang (Minangkabau: "big house") or Rumah Bagonjong (Minangkabau: "spired roof house") are the traditional homes (Indonesian: "rumah adat") of the Minangkabau in West Sumatra, Indonesia. The architecture, construction, internal and external decoration, and the functions of the house reflect the culture and values of the Minangkabau. A Rumah Gadang serves as a residence, a hall for family meetings, and for ceremonial activities. In the matrilineal Minangkabau society, the Rumah Gadang is owned by the women of the family who live there; ownership is passed from mother to daughter.

The houses have a dramatic curved roof structure with multi-tiered, upswept gables. Shuttered windows are built into walls incised with profusely painted floral carvings. The term Rumah Gadang usually refers to the larger communal homes; however, smaller single residences share many of its architectural elements.

In West Sumatra, traditional Rumah Gadang reflects the Minangkabau people and has become the symbol of West Sumatra and Minangkabau culture. Throughout the region, numerous buildings demonstrate the design elements of Rumah Gadang, from genuine vernacular timber masonry structures built for customary ceremonies to the more mundane modern structures like those of government offices and public facilities. Today, Rumah Gadang architectural elements, especially its gonjong horn-like curved roof, can be found in modern structures, such as governor and regencies office buildings, marketplaces, hotels, the facades of Padang restaurants, and Minangkabau International Airport. An istano basa, however, is the largest and most magnificent example of this traditional architectural style.

== Background ==
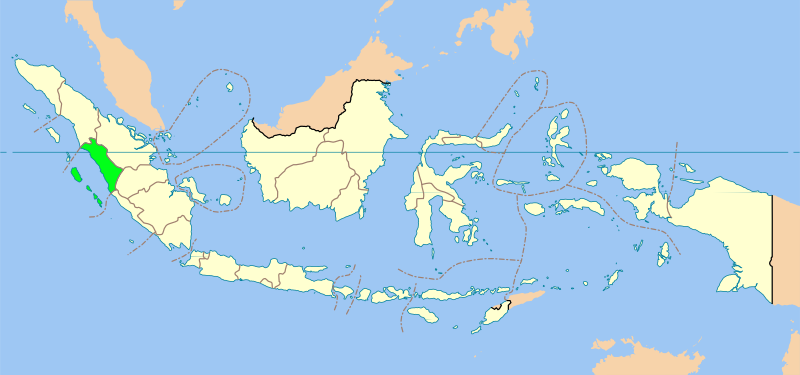
Location of West Sumatra province, home of the Minangkabau

Sumatra is the sixth largest island in the world and since the time of Marco Polo has been referred to as the 'island of gold'. It is the most resource-rich island of Indonesia, including its tea, pepper and rubber plantations, and oil, tin and other mineral resources. Lying on the equator, Sumatra has a monsoonal climate and, although more rain falls between October and May, there is no extended rainless dry season. Despite large-scale deforestation, Sumatra still has millions of acres of unexploited rainforests that provide building materials. The great hardwood trees required for large scale construction are now, however, in strictly limited supply.

Sumatra is home to one of the most diverse range of peoples in the Southeast Asian archipelago. This diversity is reflected in a range variety of often dramatic traditional homes known as rumah adat. The most common housing forms have traditionally been wooden and raised on piles, built of locally gathered materials, with steeply pitched roofs. In addition to the Minangkabau's rumah gadang, the Batak of Lake Toba region build the boat-shaped jabu with dominating carved gables and dramatic oversize roofs, and the people of Nias build the fortified omo sebua houses on massive ironwood pillars with towering roof structures.

The Minangkabau are indigenous to the highlands of central Sumatra. Their culture is matrilineal, with property and land being passed down from mother to daughter; religious and political affairs are the province of men. The Minangkabau are strongly Islamic, but also follow their own ethnic traditions, or adat. Minangkabau adat was derived from animistic and Hindu-Buddhist beliefs before the arrival of Islam, and remnants of animistic beliefs exist even among some practicing Muslims. As such, women are customarily the property owners; husbands are only tolerated in the house at certain times and under special conditions and must return to their sisters' house to sleep. Complementing this practice is the custom of merantau whereby many of the men will travel far afield for work, returning only periodically to their village of origin. Money earned on these trips is remitted for the building of contemporary rumah adat.

== Form ==
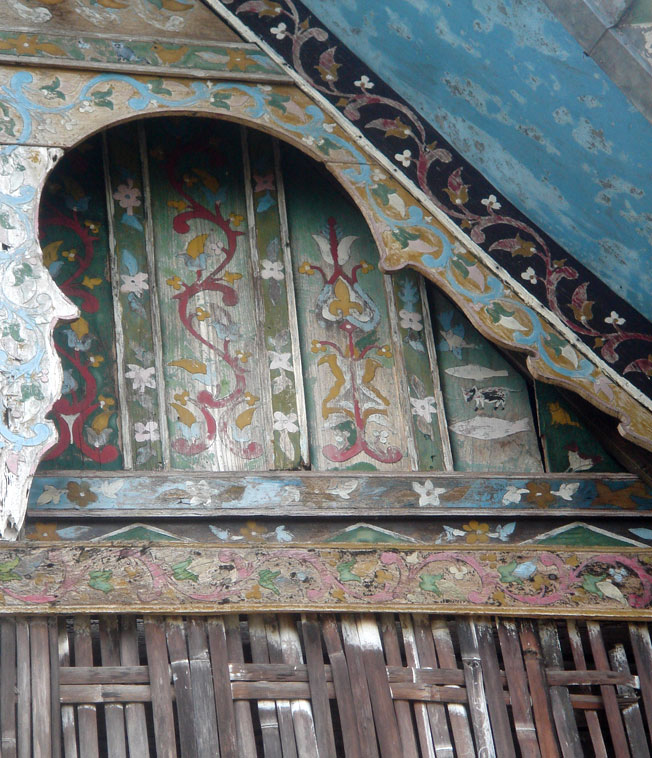
The external walls of a rumah gadang are covered with motifs, each having a symbolic meaning

A communal rumah gadang is a long house, rectangular in plan, with multiple gables and upsweeping ridges, forming buffalo horn-like ends. They normally have three-tiered projections, each with varying floor levels. They are broad and set on wooden piles that can reach as high as 3 metres (10 ft) off the ground; sometimes with a verandah running along the front face of the house which is used as a reception and dining area, and as a sleeping place for guests. Unlike the Batak Toba homes, where the roof essentially creates the living space, the Minangkabau roof rests on conventional walls. Cooking and storage areas are often in separate buildings.

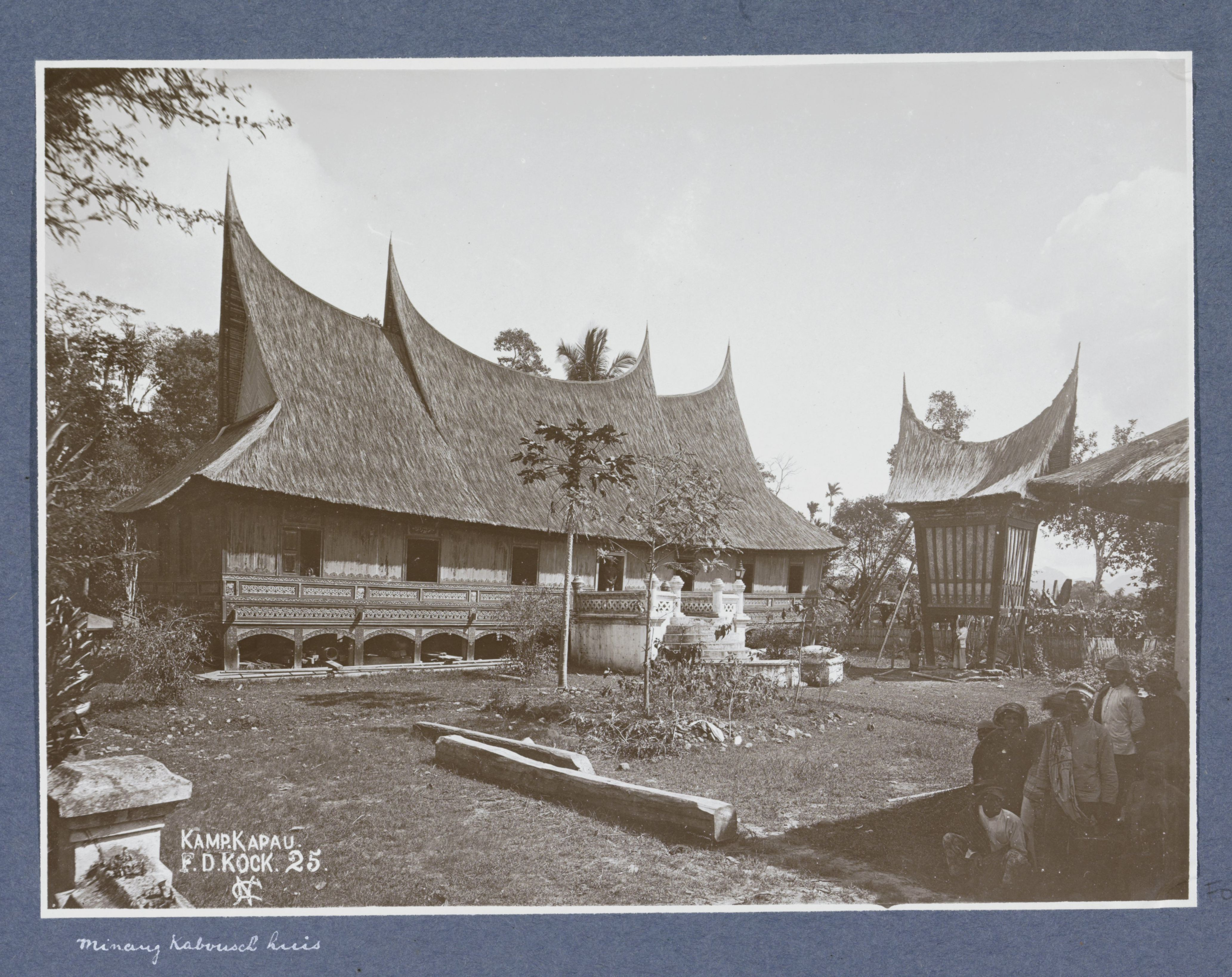
A rumah gadang and a rangkiang in 1910

The house is largely constructed of wood; an exception being the rear longitudinal wall which is a plain lattice woven in a chequered pattern from split bamboo. The roof is of a truss and cross-beam construction and is typically covered with thatch from the fibre of the sugar palm (ijuk), the toughest thatch material available and said to last a hundred years. The thatch is laid in bundles which can be easily fitted to the curved, multi-gabled roof. Contemporary homes, however, are more frequently using corrugated iron in place of thatch. Roof finials are formed from thatch bound by decorative metal bindings and drawn into points said to resemble buffalo horns — an allusion to a legend concerning a battle between two water buffaloes from which the 'Minangkabau' name is thought to have been derived. The roof peaks themselves are built up out of many small battens and rafters.

The women who share the house have sleeping quarters set into alcoves – traditionally odd in number – that are set in a row against the rear wall and curtained off by the vast interior space of the main living area. Traditionally, large communal rumah gadang will be surrounded by smaller homes built for married sisters and daughters of the parent family. It is the responsibility of the women's maternal uncle to ensure that each marriageable woman in the family has a room of her own. To this end he will build either a new house or, more commonly, annexes to the original one. It is said that the number of married daughters in a home can be told by the counting its horn-like extensions; as they are not always added symmetrically, rumah gadang can sometimes look unbalanced. Adolescent boys reaching puberty traditionally live in the village surau, a small mosque. Husbands do not stay much long in the house either working or socializing outside in coffeeshops until evening which they retreat.

=== Architectural elements ===
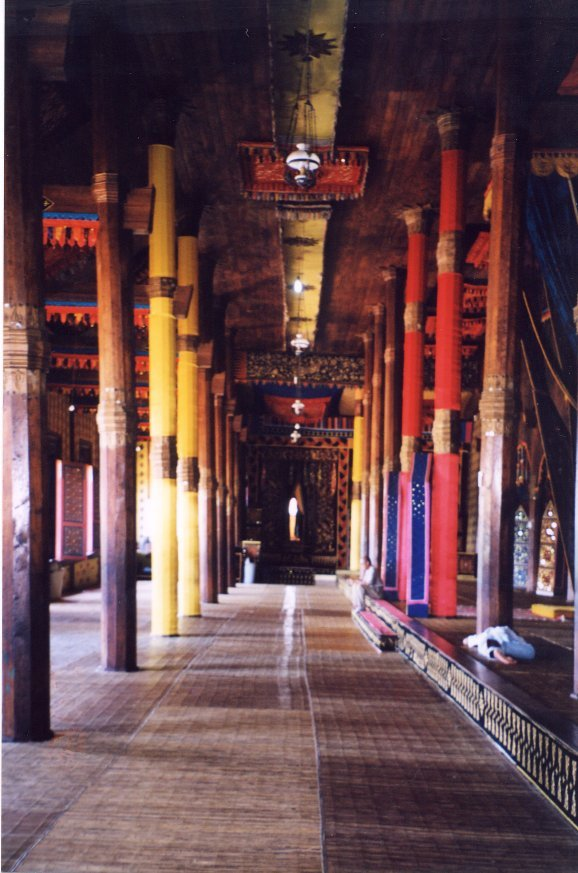
Interior of the Pagaruyung Palace, showing the long common area of a rumah gadang. The two-level floor is a symbolic element specific to the palace.

Each element of a rumah gadang has its own symbolic meaning, which is referred to in adat speech and aphorisms. The elements of a rumah gadang includes:

- gonjong, hornlike roof structure
- singok, triangular wall under the ends of gonjong
- pereng, shelf under the singok
- anjuang, raised floor at the end of one style of rumah gadang
- dindiang ari, the walls on the side elevations
- dindiang tapi, the walls on the front and back elevations
- papan banyak, front facade
- papan sakapiang, a shelf or middle band on the periphery of the house
- salangko, wall enclosing space under a house that has been built on stilts

Some symbolisms of the house, for example, relate to the gonjong reaching to god and the dindiang tapi, which is traditionally made of plaited strips of bamboo, symbolizing the strength and utility of the community which is formed when individual Minangkabau become part of the larger community instead of standing alone. The peaks of the roof are said to represent buffalo horns as well as reaching to god mentioned earlier.

The pillars of the ideal rumah gadang are arranged in five rows which run the length of the house. These rows divide the interior into four long spaces called lanjar. The lanjar at the rear of the house is divided into bedrooms (ruang). According to adat, a rumah gadang must have at least five ruang, and the ideal number is nine. The other lanjar are used as a common area, called the labuah gajah (elephant road), for living and ceremonial events. The space underneath the pillars (rumah dalam) and the side route leading to the kitchen (pangkalan) is where industry such as weaving and sewing take place.

A number of rice barns (rangkiang) ideally accompany a rumah gadang, with each having a different name and function. The rangkiang sitinjau lauik, contains rice for the family, particularly for adat ceremonies. The rangkiang sitangka lapa contains rice for donation to poor villagers and for times of famine in the village. The rangkiang sibayau-bayau contains rice for the daily needs of the family.

=== Ornamentation ===
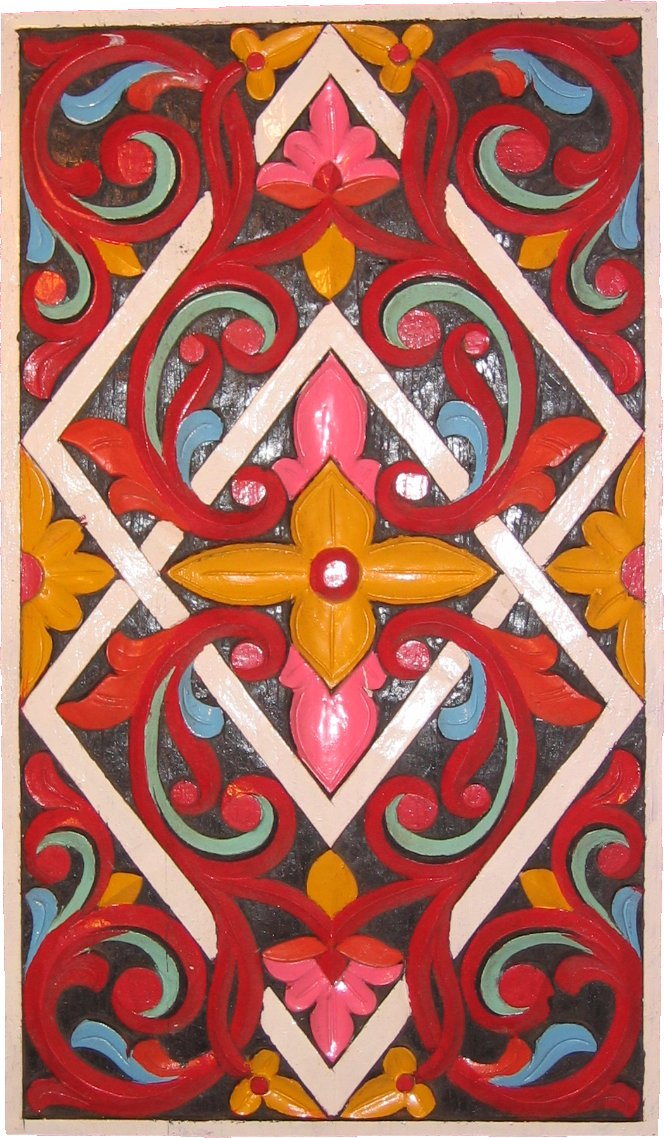
An example of the carvings from a rumah gadang

The Minangkabau traditionally embellish the wooden walls, pillars, and ceilings of the Rumah Gadang with bas-relief carved wooden motifs that reflect and symbolize their adat. The motifs comprise profuse floral designs based on a simple underlying geometric structure. The motifs are similar to those of the Minangkabau woven songket textiles, with colors thought to have been derived from Chinese brocades. Traditionally, the motifs do not show animals or humans in a realistic form, although some may represent animals, human beings, or their activities or behavior. The motifs are based on the Minangkabau concept of aesthetics, which is part of their view of their world (Alam Minangkabau) in which expression is always based upon the natural environment. A well-known adat aphorism says, 'nature is our teacher.

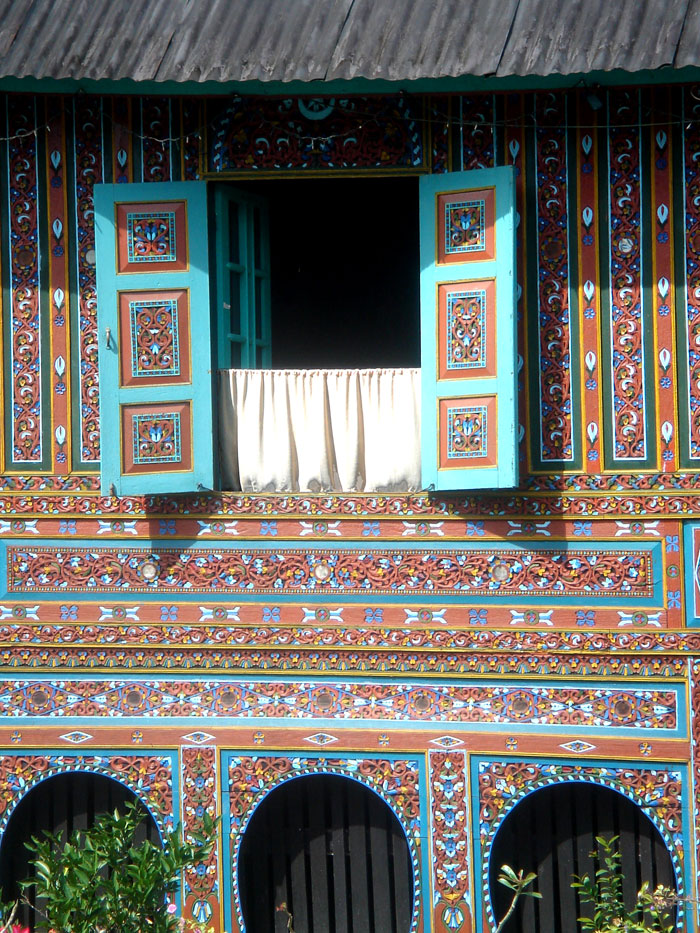
View of the external carvings of a rumah gadang. The inner side of the shutter is painted as they are visible when open.

Ninety-four motifs have been observed on rumah gadang. Thirty-seven of them refer to flora, such as kaluak paku ('fern tendrils'), saluak laka ('interwoven rattan'), pucuak rabuang ('bamboo shoots'), areca-nut palms, and lumuik hanyuik ('washed-away moss'). Twenty-eight motifs refer to fauna, such as tupai tatagun ('startled squirrel'), itiak pulang patang ('ducks going home in the afternoon) which symbolizes co-operation and homecoming wanderers, and kumbang janti (golden bumblebee). The remaining twenty-nine motifs refer to humans and sometimes their activities or behavior, such as rajo tigo (three kings of the realm), kambang manih (sweet flower, used to describe an amiable girl) and jalo takambang (casting a net).

=== Variations ===
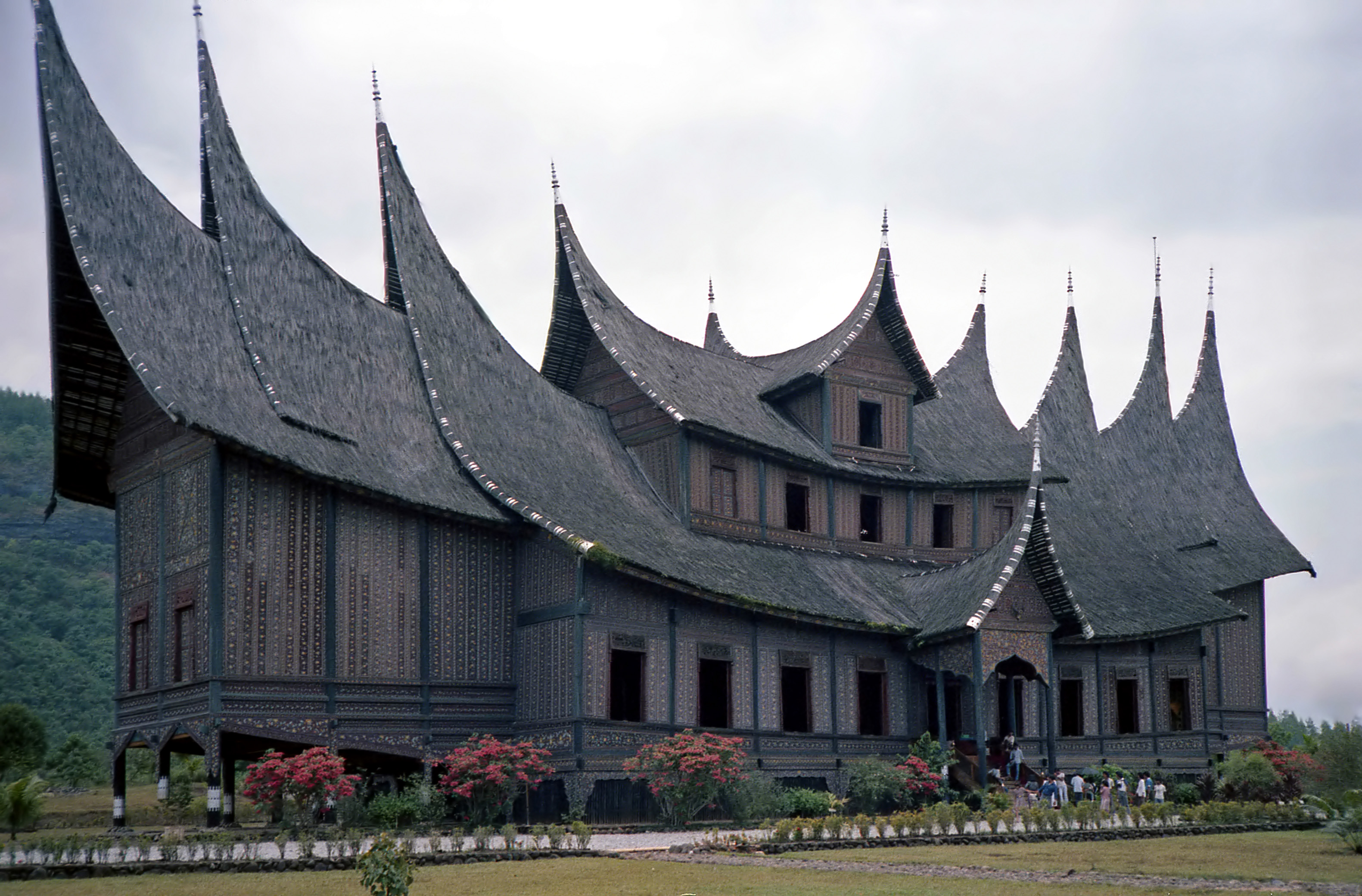
The Minangkabau royal palace at Pagaruyung has three roofs which rise in tiers; the first two rise laterally and the top room transversally. Extensions at either side add a further two roof forms.

The rumah gadang is built in one of two basic designs: koto piliang and bodi caniago. These forms reflect different two variations of Minangkabau social structure. The koto piliang design reflects an aristocratic and hierarchical social structure, with the house containing anjuang (raised floors) at each end to permit elevated seating of clan leaders during ceremonial events. The bodi caniago design reflects a democratic social structure, with the floors being flat and on one level.

Large communal homes are entered through a doorway in the centre of the structure which is usually surrounded by a perpendicular porch with a triangular gable and upsweeping peaked ridge end. The variation with no entry porch is named bapaserek or surambi papek ("without veranda").

The larger and more opulent houses, have higher walls and multiple roofs, often with five elements inserted into each other, and supported by large wooden columns. Variations on the number of columns are known as the gajah maharam ("elephant kneeling"), which may have forty columns resulting in a shorter and stouter form, and the rajo babandiang ('design of grandeur') with fifty pillars and a more slender form. An additional six columns are required at each end for the anjuang of the Koto Piliang variation.

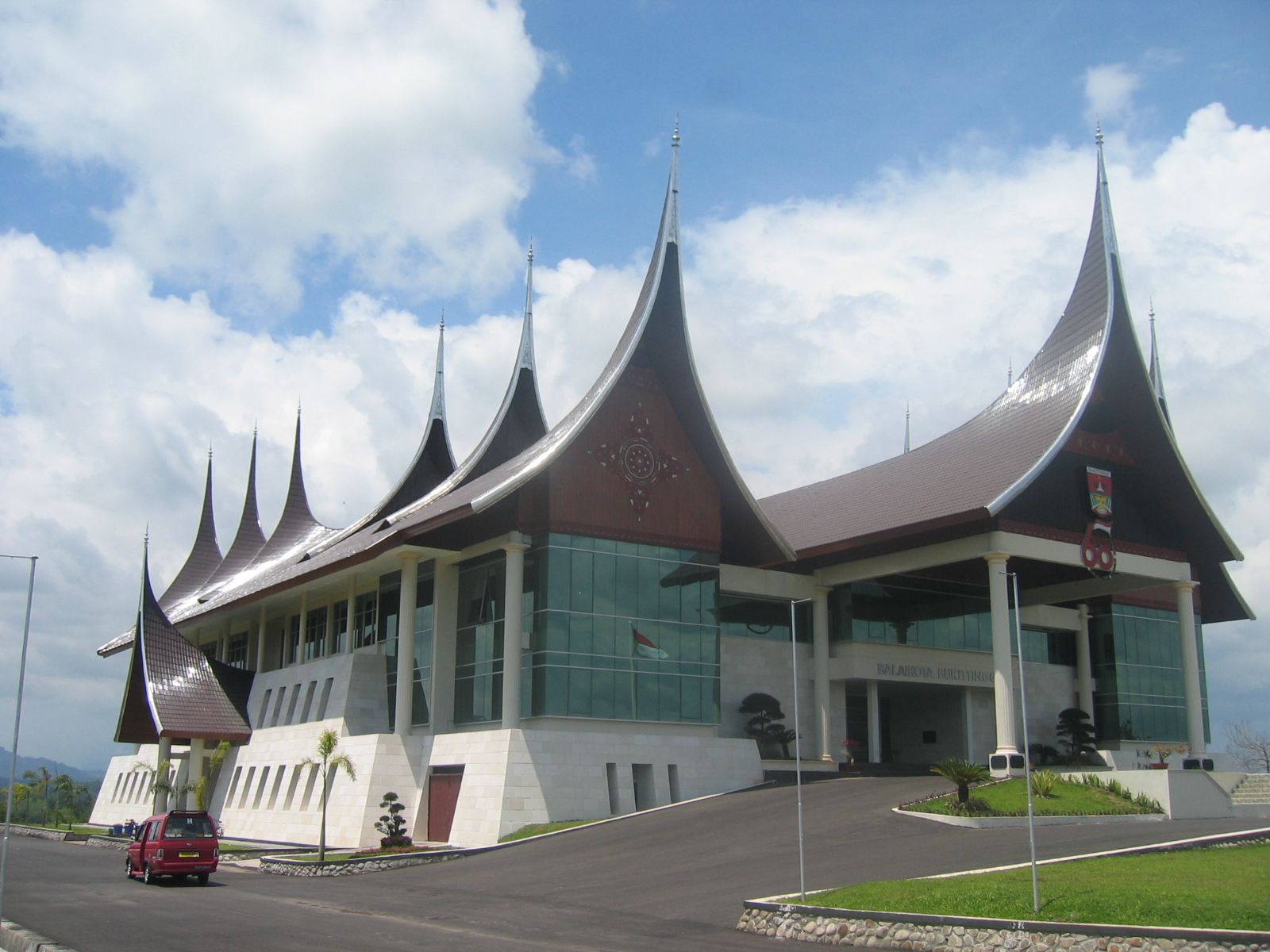
A government building that contains elements of the rumah gadang style

A Minangkabau traditional council hall, known as a balai adat, appears similar to a rumah gadang. This type of building is used by clan leaders as a meeting place, and it is not enclosed by walls, except for the anjuang of the Koto Piliang model. The Pagaruyung Palace is built in the traditional Minangkabau rumah gadang architectural style, but one unusual aspect is that it has three levels. In West Sumatra some modern government and commercial buildings, and domestic houses (rumah gedung), have adopted elements of the rumah gadang style.

There has been a sizable Minangkabau settlement in Negeri Sembilan (now in Malaysia) since the seventeenth century, with the chief of the Minangkabau still ruler there. The Negeri Sembilan Minangkabau, however, have adopted the Malay-style roof construction, with continuous ridge piece thatched with lengths of palm-leaf attached to battens. Although this has meant the loss of the characteristic curved roof and has blunter eaves, it is still considered dignified and beautiful. More orthodox Islamic influence has also led to variations such as modifications to the interior layout, as women are more restricted to the rear of the house than in the case of the matrilineal Sumatran Minangkabau.

== Construction ==
The construction of a house is subject to specific regulations, laid down by the ancestors and formalised in adat, that need to be observed if the house is to become a beautiful and pleasant building. The construction and maintenance of a rumah gadang is the responsibility of ninik mamak, the elder male blood-relatives of the matrilineal descent group that owns and builds it.

== See also ==
- Architecture of Indonesia
- Architecture of Sumatra
