= Tanah Datar Regency =

Regency in West Sumatra, Indonesia

Tanah Datar Regency Kabupaten Tanah Datar
- Regency
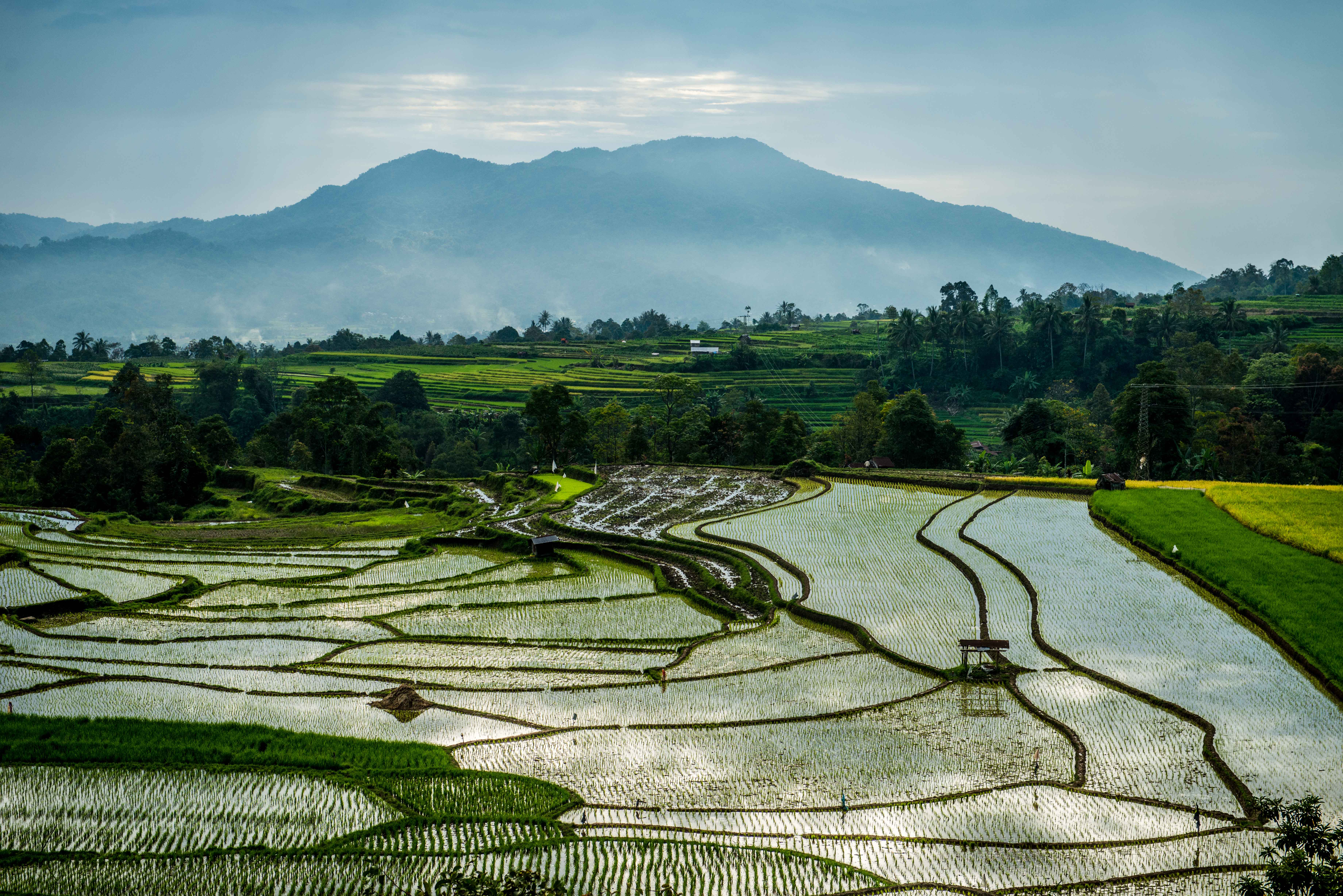
- Rice fields in Tanah Datar

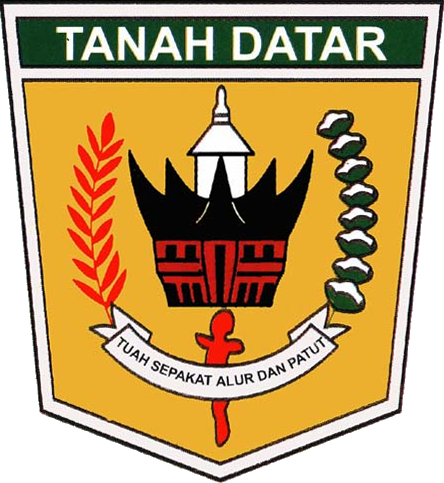
- Coat of arms
- Motto: Tuah Sepakat Alur dan Patut (Applying Consensus by Rules and Norms)
- Location within West Sumatra

- Location in Sumatra and Indonesia Tanah Datar Regency (Indonesia)
- Coordinates: 0.45°S 100.583°E
- Country: Indonesia
- Province: West Sumatra
- Regency seat: Batusangkar

Government
  - Regent: Eka Putra
  - Vice Regent: Ahmad Fadly

Area
  - Total: 1,337.10 km^{2} (516.26 sq mi)

Population (mid 2025 estimate)
  - Total: 392,740
  - Density: 293.73/km^{2} (760.74/sq mi)
- Time zone: UTC+7 (IWST)
- Area code: (+62) 752
- Website: tanahdatar.go.id

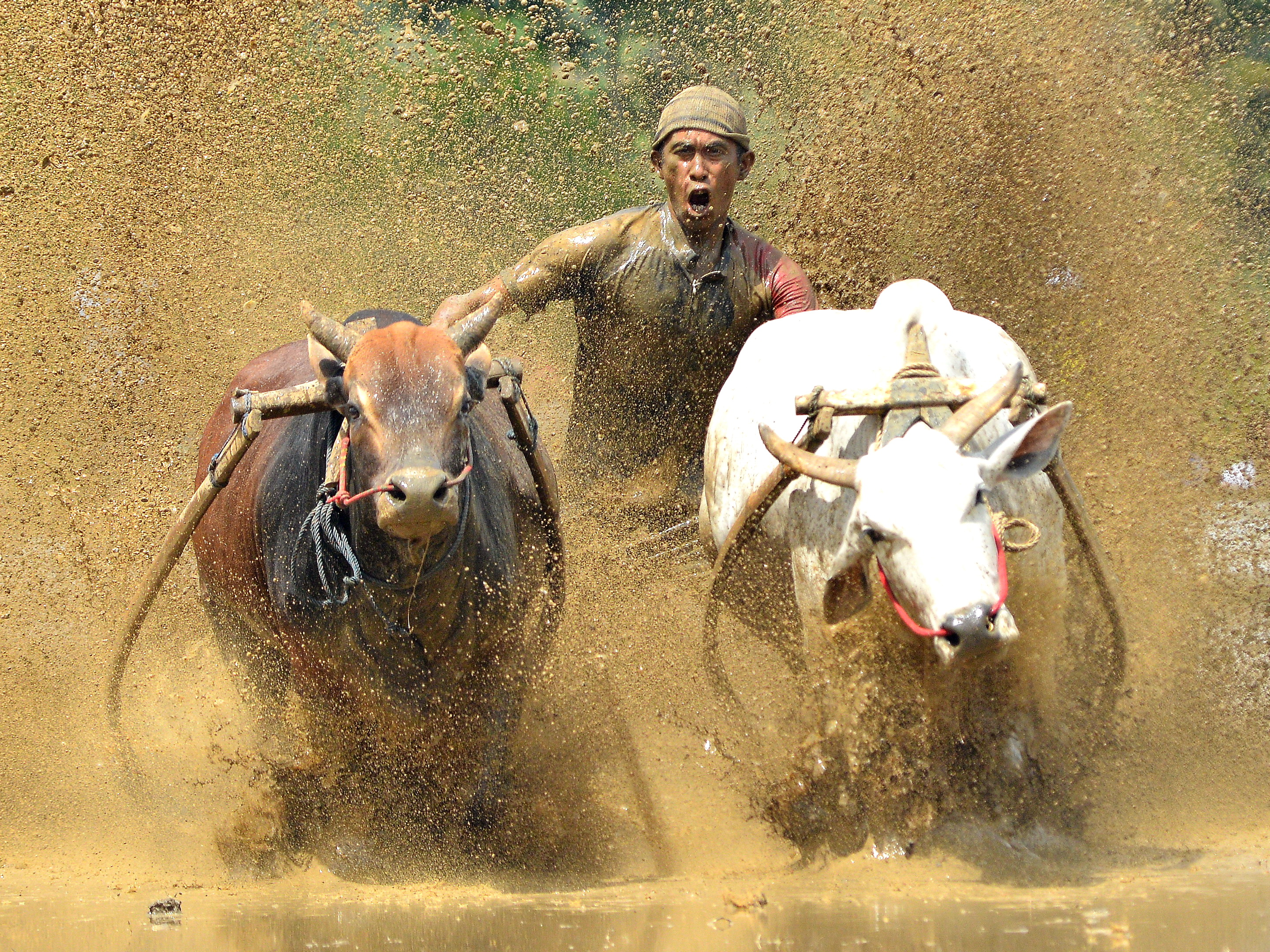
Pacu jawi, a traditional bull race from Tanah Datar.

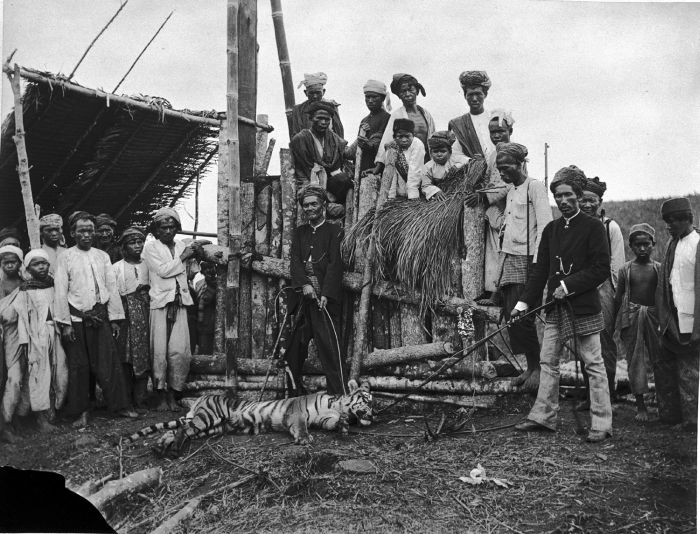
Group of people at a tiger trap with a tiger in Soepajang, Bovenlanden Padang, on Sumatra's west coast. (Circa 1895)

Tanah Datar Regency (Indonesian: Kabupaten Tanah Datar, lit. 'Flat Land Regency'; pronounced [kabuˌpat̪ɛn̪ ˌt̪anah ˈdat̪ar]) is a landlocked regency (kabupaten) in West Sumatra province, Indonesia. The regency has an area of 1,337.1 km^{2} and had a population of 338,484 at the 2010 Census, which rose to 371,704 at the 2020 Census. The official estimate as of mid 2025 was 392,740 (comprising 198,360 males and 194,380 females). The regency seat is the town of Batusangkar. The city of Padang Panjang is also geographically located within the regency but constitutes a municipality (kota otonom, meaning "autonomous city") of its own.

Tanah Datar has several tourist attractions including the Pagaruyung Palace (Istano Pagaruyuang) with its museum, Sanskrit and Malay language stone inscriptions from the 14th century, several sites with megaliths (batu tagak), and the village Pandai Sikat (Pandai Sikek), where the traditional songket (kain balapak) is woven. The northern part of Lake Singkarak is situated in Tanah Datar. The traditional bull race pacu jawi takes place in the regency, too.

== Administrative districts ==
Tanah Datar is divided into fourteen districts (kecamatan), listed below with their areas and their populations at the 2010 Census and 2020 Census, together with the official estimates as of mid 2023. The table also includes the locations of the district administrative centres, the number of administrative villages (nagari) in each district, and its postal code.

Name of District (kecamatan)	Area in km^{2}	Pop'n 2010 Census	Pop'n 2020 Census	Pop'n mid 2023 Estimate	Admin centre	No. of villages	Post code
Sepuluk Koto (X Koto)	148.68	42,133	46,229	47,700	Pasa Rabaa	9	27151
Batipuh	101.18	29,896	31,883	32,628	Kubu Karambia	8	27265
Batipuh Selatan (South Batipuh)	166.78	10,430	11,217	11,507	Sumpur	4	27266
Pariangan	58.29	19,519	20,744	21,207	Simabur	6	27264
Rambatan	129.38	33,287	37,180	38,563	Rambatan	5	27271
Lima Kaum	30.63	35,784	38,061	38,920	Lima Kaum	5	27211 - 27216
Tanjung Emas	128.75	21,689	25,047	26,231	Saruaso	4	27280
Padang Ganting	68.61	13,641	14,599	14,955	Padang Ganting	2	27282
Lintau Buo	110.65	17,564	19,771	20,553	Buo	4	27292
Lintau Buo Utara (North Lintau Buo)	199.28	34,810	37,652	38,690	Balai Tangah	5	27293
Sungayang	68.36	16,903	18,671	19,303	Sungayang	5	27294
Sungai Tarab	83.86	29,282	32,694	33,906	Sungai Tarab	10	27261
Salimpaung	56.35	20,768	23,551	24,535	Tabek Patah	6	27262 - 27263
Tanjuang Baru	26.30	12,788	14,405	14,978	Tanjuang Alam	2	27281
Totals	1,337.10	338,494	371,704	383,676	Batusangkar	75	

== Geography ==
Geographically, Tanah Datar Regency is located in the middle of West Sumatra Province, at 00º17" South Latitude - 00º39" South Latitude and 100º19" East Longitude – 100º51" East Longitude. Average altitude 400 to 1000 meters above sea level.

Tanah Datar Regency is located between two mountains, namely Mount Marapi and Mount Singgalang. This topography is dominated by hilly areas and has two-thirds of the Singkarak lake.

In general, the climate in Tanah Datar Regency is moderate with temperatures between 12 °C–25 °C with an average rainfall of more than 3,000 mm per year. Most of the rain falls from September to February. This high rainfall causes sufficient water availability, thus enabling extensive agricultural business to be developed.

== Economies ==
Tanah Datar Regency is an agricultural area, more than 70% of the population works in the agricultural sector, food crop agriculture, plantations, fisheries, and animal husbandry. Likewise, community businesses in other sectors are also based on agriculture such as tourism and small industry or agro-industry. The people of Tanah Datar are also known to like to save with a total public savings of IDR 223 billion in 2004.

The economic potential of Tanah Datar Regency can be categorized into three categories, namely: Very Potential, Potential, and Not Potential. The agricultural sectors that have the potential to be developed are cassava, cabbage, rubber, sugar cane, beef cattle breeding, horse breeding, beef goat farming, broiler farming, non-breed chicken, duck farming, and freshwater fish farming. Other sectors that have great potential to be developed are the civil building construction industry, retail traders of processed food products, telecommunication stall businesses, souvenir traders, and historical tourism. Tanah Datar Regency has the potential of almost all agricultural sectors except cloves, tobacco, spinach, and pepper. The mining sector that has the potential to be developed is the excavation of limestone and gravel.

== Tourism ==
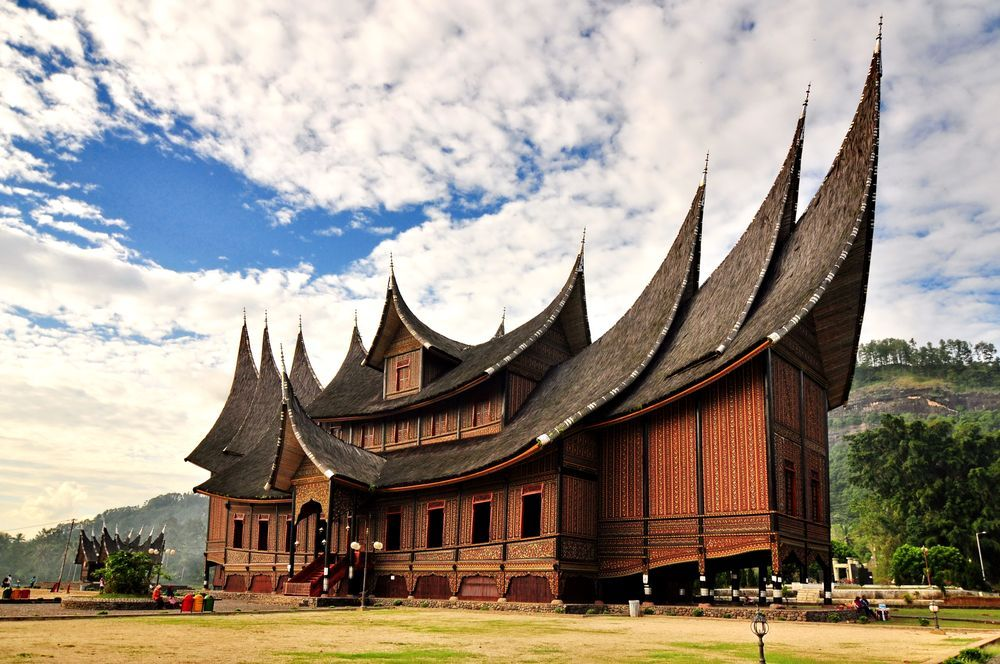
Pagaruyung Palace

In Tanah Datar Regency today, there are still many Minangkabau traditional historical relics, both in the form of objects and Minangkabau traditional cultural arrangements. The pledge Adat Basandi Syarak, Syarak Basandi Kitabullah also known as the Satie Oath came from Tanah Datar, namely in Bukit Marapalam, Puncak Pato, North Lintau Buo District.

Historical tourist attractions in Tanah Datar Regency include the Pagaruyung Palace (Istano Basa Pagaruyuang), Balai Ruang Sari, Puncak Pato, Adityawarman Inscription (Prasasti Adityawarman), Surau Lubuk Bauk (Lubuk Bauk Surau), Balimbing Tower House (Rumah Gadang Balimbing), Waterwheel, Basurek Stone (Batu Basurek), Pariangan Old Village (Nagari Tuo Pariangan), Fort van der Capellen, Batikam Stone (Batu Batikam), and King Palace (Istano Rajo). Meanwhile, for natural and cultural tourism in Tanah Datar Regency, there are Anai Valley, Tabek Pateh Panorama, Pariangan Village, Singkarak Lake, Batu Patah Hill, and Ngalau Pangian.
