= Batusangkar =

Coordinates: 0°27′S 100°35′E

Batusangkar (batu: stone, rock, sangkar: cage) is the capital of the Tanah Datar regency of West Sumatra, Indonesia. It is known as "the city of culture". It is located within three districts, Lima Kaum, Tanjung Emas, and Sungai Tarab. It is unknown the city's name means stone in a cage or a stone shaped like a cage

== History ==
The history of Batusangkar dates back to the neolithic-era due to the presence of ancient sites like the Batu Batikam. This site represents a time where bloodshed was avoided due to early principles of democracy. The foundation of the Minangkabau society is preserved in ancient settlements such as the Des Pariangan, regarded as the ancestral heartland of the culture. Social organization remain a trait rooted in the agricultural landscape. Batusangkar also has a long history between Islam, integrating Islam with local traditions. There are traditional village landmarks such as the Masjid Ishlah. The region's political and social history evolved through aristocratic and royal means represented by the grand architectural symbol of the former royal center, Istana Pagaruyung. These structures represents Batusangkar's show how status and power were expressed through timber and multi-tiered roofs.

The town is near the former seat of the Minangkabau royalty established by Adityawarman in Pagaruyung, represented by the reconstructed Pagaruyung Palace. Several stones bearing inscriptions (prasasti) left by Adityavarman that remain in the region are the first written records in West Sumatra. After the death of Adityawarman (circa 1376), no more stone inscriptions were produced.

=== Fort van der Capellen ===
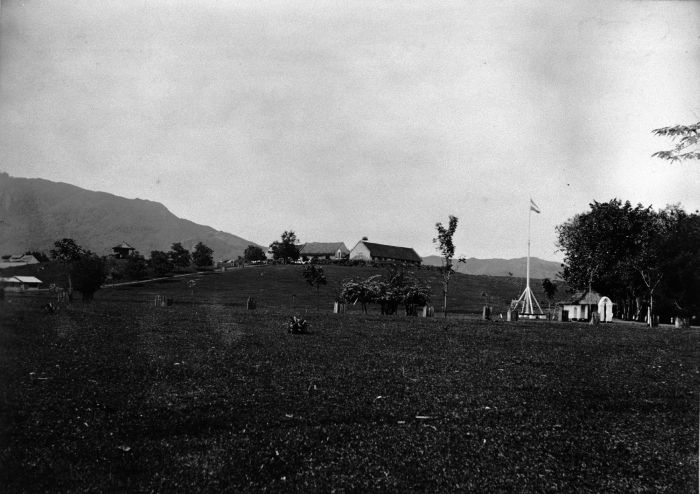
Fort van der Capellen 1822-1826

The town was known as Fort van der Capellen during colonial times when it was a Dutch outpost established during the Padri War (1821–37). The fort was built between 1822 and 1826 and named after the Governor-General of the Dutch East Indies, Godert van der Capellen. The city was officially renamed Batusangkar in 1949, replacing its colonial name.

=== Indo Jelito building ===
Indo Jelito building is the residence of the regent of Tanah Datar. Each regent who has served has automatically lived here. This building itself is a former residence of the Dutch resident Van der Capellen during colonial times, with a strong architectural style of Art Deco style buildings that characterized the Dutch.
