= National Museum of Indonesia =

Historical museum in Jakarta

- Museum Nasional Indonesia
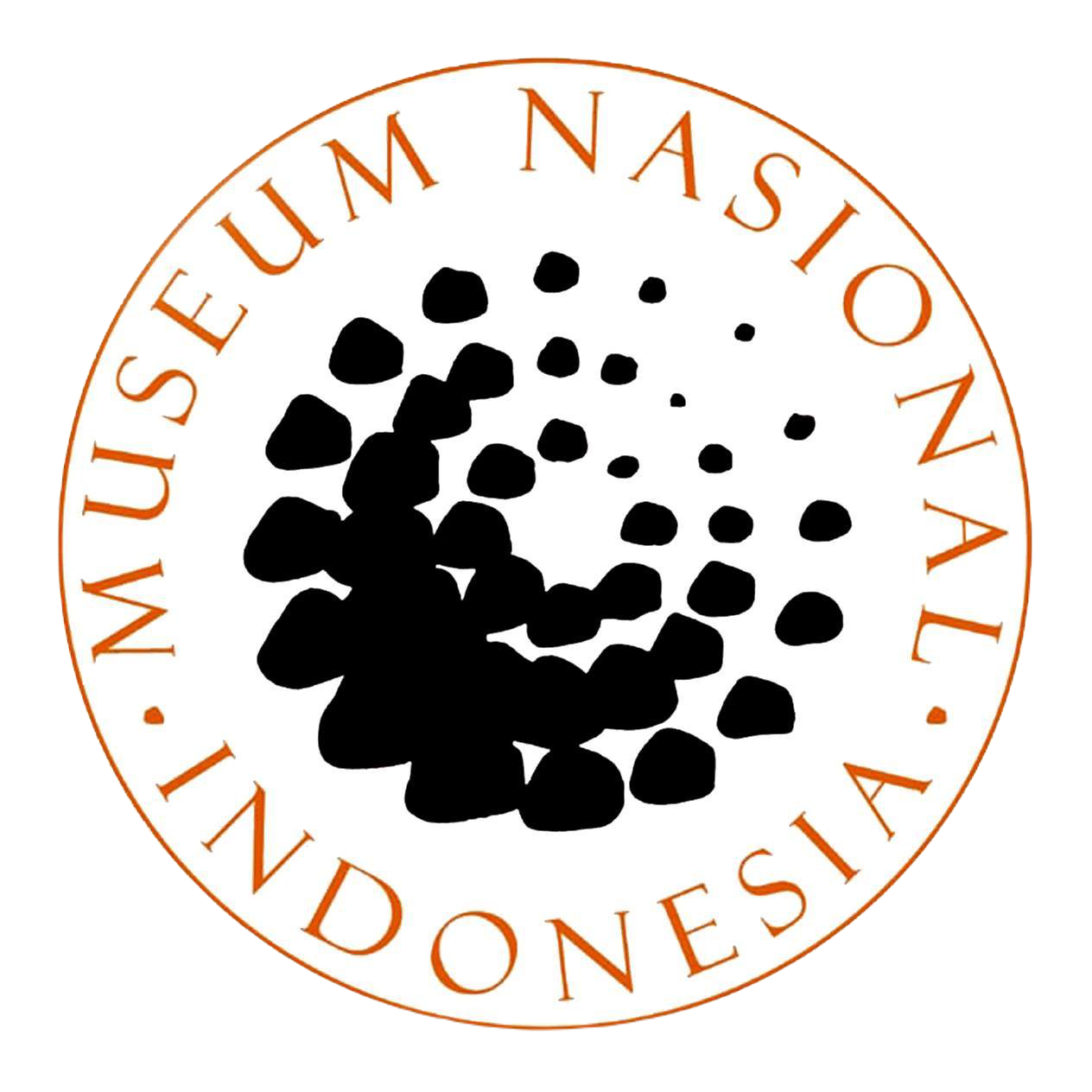

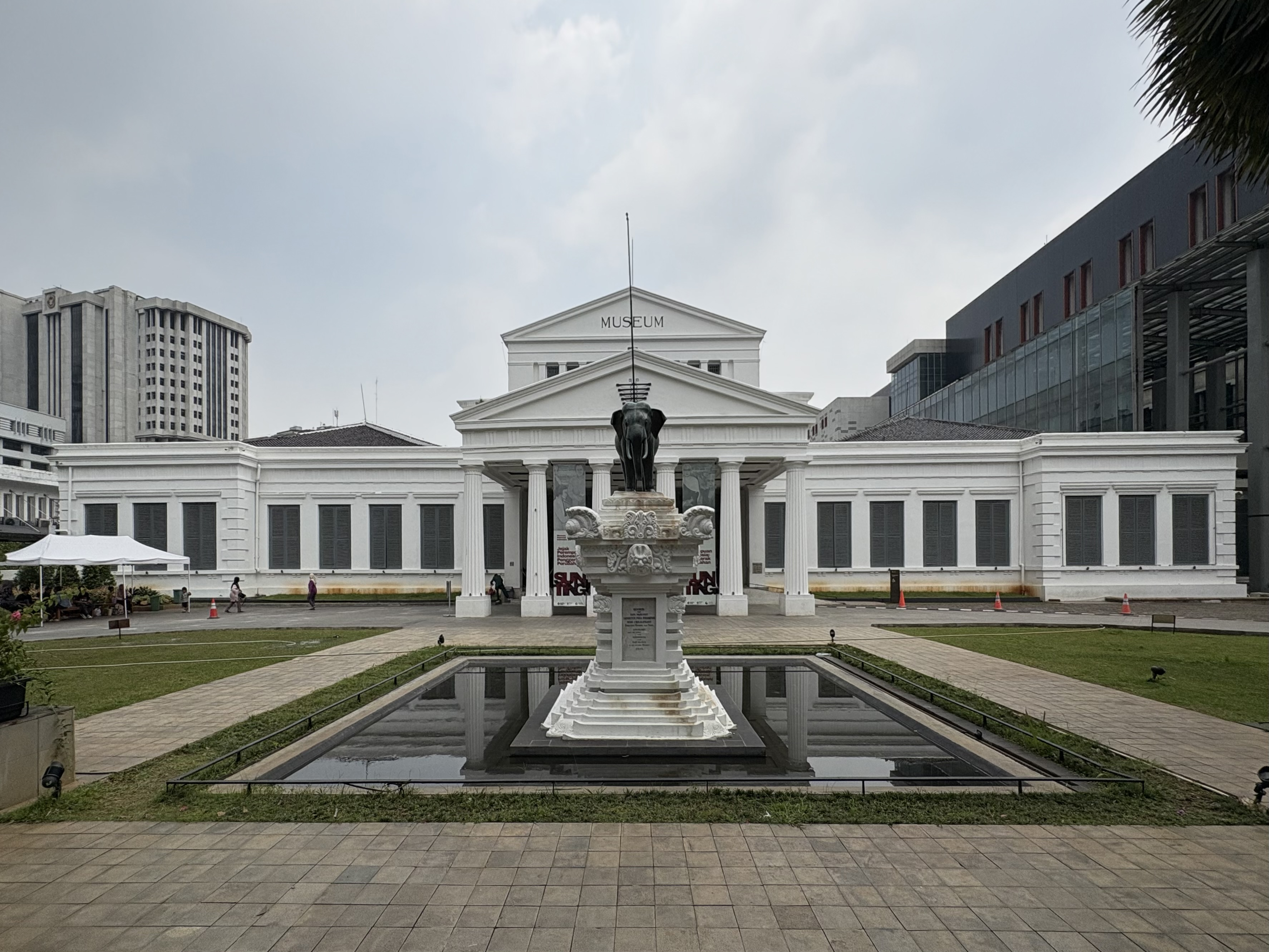
- The front view of the museum's Gedung Gajah wing

- Location within Jakarta
- Interactive fullscreen map
- Established: 1778
- Location: Jl. Medan Merdeka Barat No.12, Central Jakarta, Jakarta, Indonesia
- Coordinates: 6°10′34″S 106°49′18″E
- Type: Archaeology museums
- Owner: Ministry of Culture (Indonesian Heritage Agency)
- Public transit access: Monas
- Website: museumnasional.or.id

The National Museum of Indonesia (Indonesian: Museum Nasional Indonesia) is an archeological, historical, ethnological, and geographical museum located in Jalan Medan Merdeka Barat, Central Jakarta, right on the west side of Merdeka Square. Popularly known as the Elephant Museum (Indonesian: Museum Gajah) after the elephant statue in its forecourt, its broad collections cover all of Indonesia's territory and almost all of its history. The museum has endeavoured to preserve Indonesia's heritage for two centuries.

The museum is regarded as one of the most complete and the best in Indonesia, as well as one of the finest museums in Southeast Asia. The museum has preserved about 141,000 objects, ranging from prehistoric artifacts to archeology, numismatics, ceramics, ethnography, history and geography collections. It has comprehensive collections of stone statues of the classical Hindu-Buddhist period of ancient Java and Sumatra as well as quite extensive collections of Asian ceramics.

A fire affected some rooms of the old building on 16 September 2023. This led to the museum being closed for renovation until October 2024.

== History ==
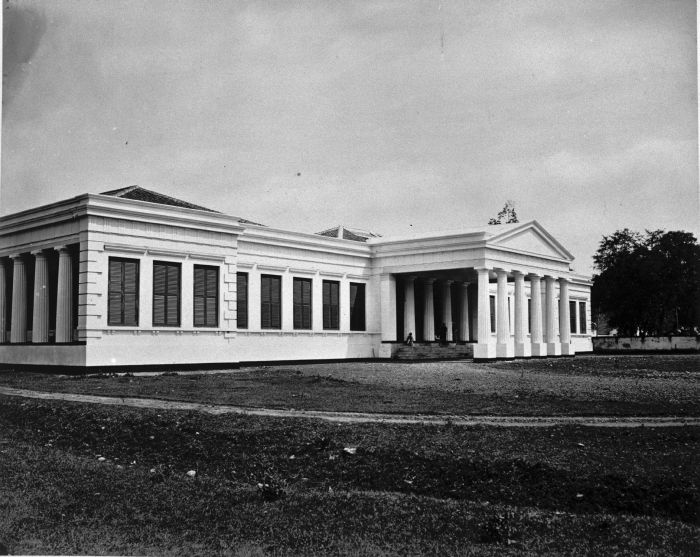
The museum in the late 19th century, known as Het museum van het Koninklijk Bataviaasch Genootschap van Kunsten en Wetenschappen

=== Dutch colonial period ===
On April 24, 1778, a group of Dutch intellectuals established a scientific institution under the name Bataviaasch Genootschap van Kunsten en Wetenschappen, (Royal Batavian Society of Arts and Sciences). This private body aimed to promote research in the field of arts and sciences, especially in history, archaeology, ethnography, and physics, and publishing various research findings. The main objective of Bataviaasch Genootschap was to analyze the cultural and scientific aspects of the East Indies, including its society and natural environment, through facilitating research conducted by experts.

One of the founders of the institution – JCM Radermacher – donated a building at De Groote Rivier Street in the Old Batavia area and a collection of cultural objects and books, which were of great value to start a museum and library for the society. The other founders of the institution were Jacob de Meijer, Josua van Inperen, Johannes Hooijman, Sirardus Bartlo, Willem van Hogendorp, Hendrik Nicolaas Lacle, Jacobus van der Steeg, Egbert Blomhert, Paulus Gevers and Frederik Baron van Wurmb.

Owing to the institution's growing collections, Governor Sir Thomas Stamford Raffles built new premises behind the Societeit de Harmonie (today Jalan Majapahit No. 3) at the beginning of the 19th century and named it the Literary Society. In 1862 the Dutch East Indies government decided to build a new museum that would not only serve as an office but also could be used to house, preserve, and display the collections.

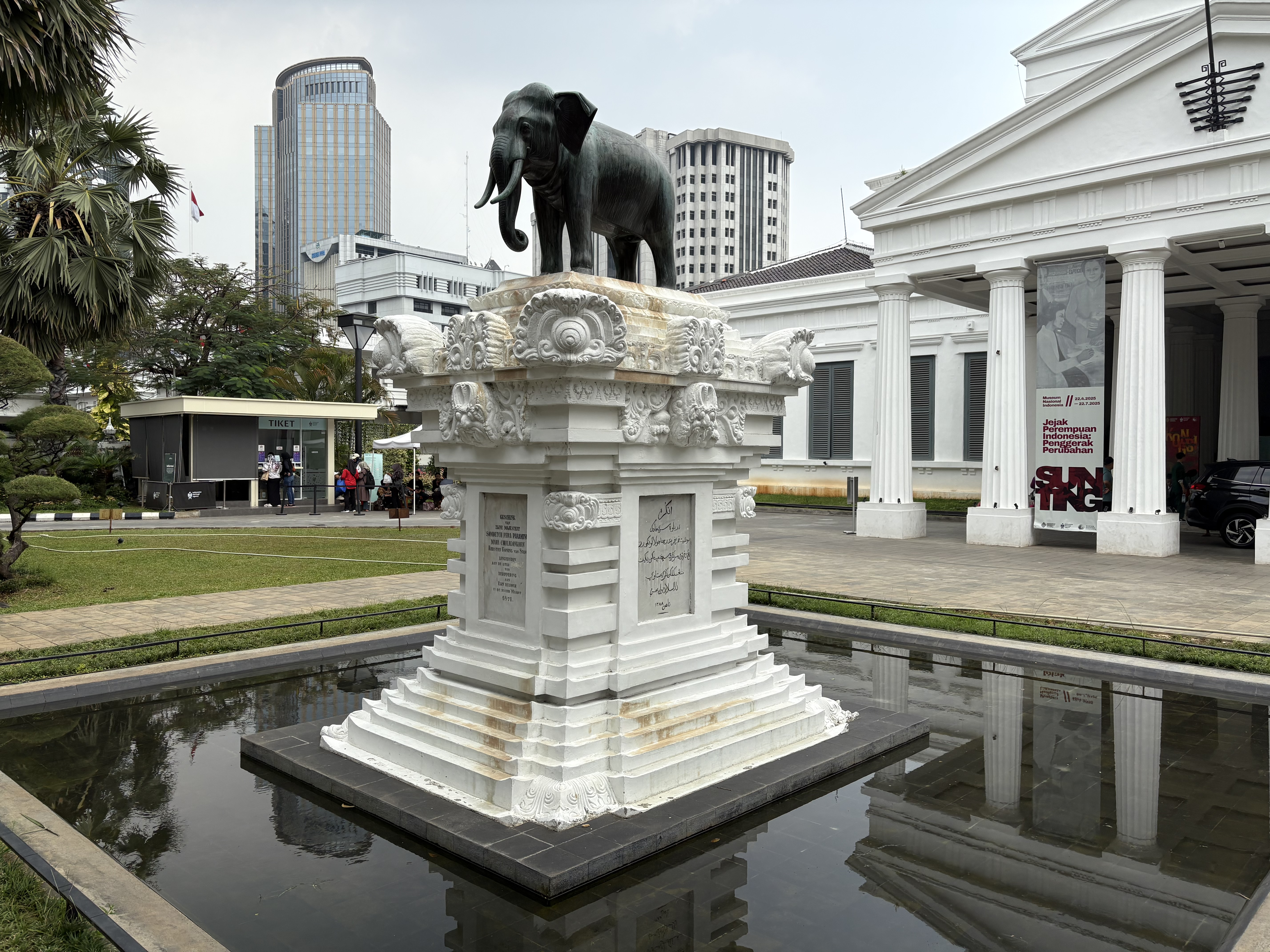
King Chulalongkorn's elephant statue

The museum was officially opened in 1868 and is popularly known as Gedung Gajah (Elephant Building) sometimes called Gedung Arca (The House of Statues). It was called Gedung Gajah on account of the bronze elephant statue in the front yard – a gift to Batavia from King Chulalongkorn of Siam in 1871. It was also called Gedung Arca because a great variety of statues from different periods were on display in the house.

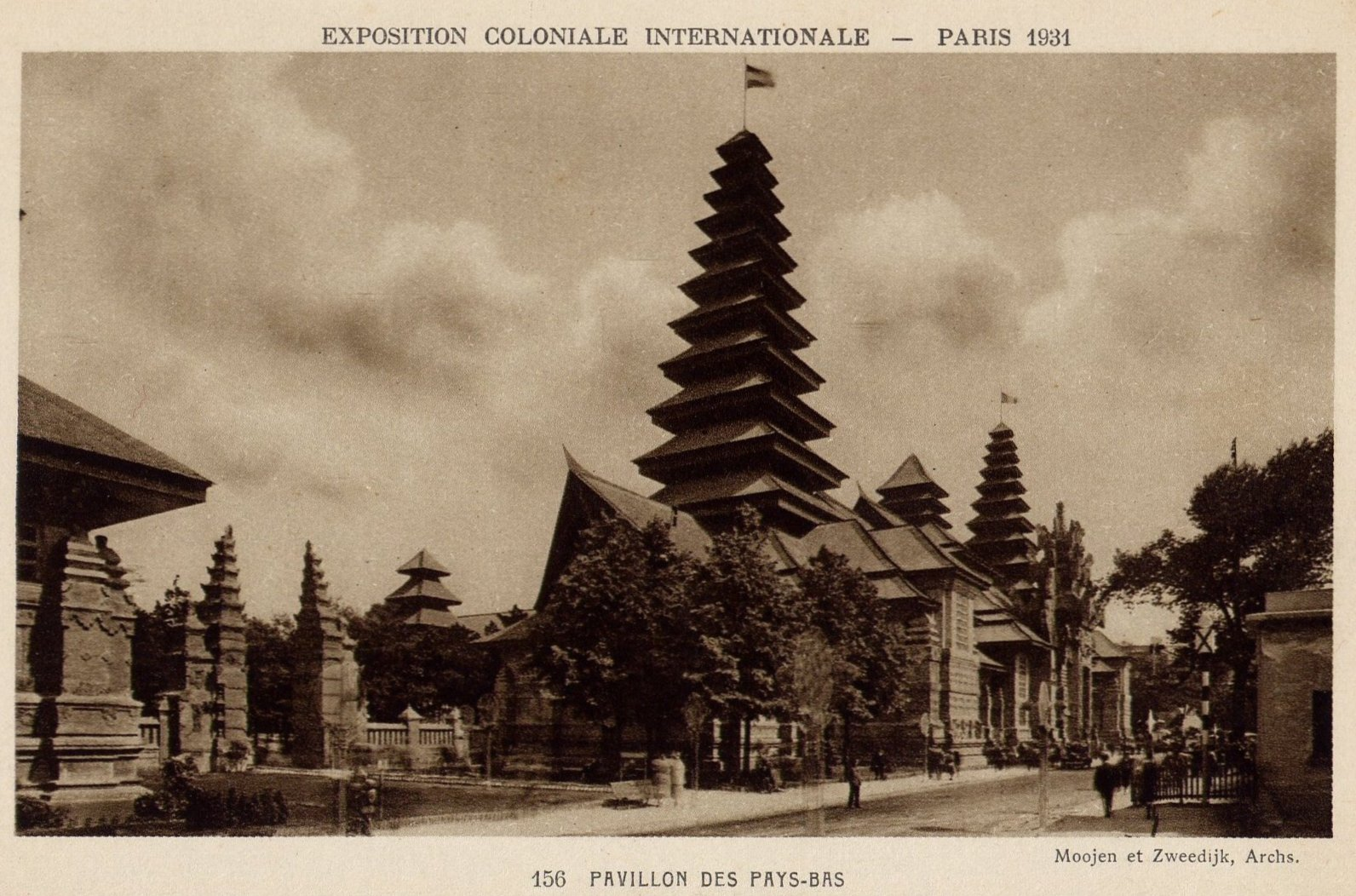
The Dutch pavilion at the 1931 Paris Colonial Exposition that was burned down in a fire, destroying some of the museum's collections

In 1931, the museum's collections were exhibited at the World Colonial Exposition in Paris. However, a fire in the exhibition hall demolished the Dutch East Indies' exhibition pavilion and destroyed most of the objects. The museum received some insurance money as compensation and the following year these funds were used to build the old ceramics room, the bronze room, and both treasure rooms on the second floor.

=== Post-independence ===
Following Indonesian independence, in February 1950, the institution was renamed the Lembaga Kebudayaan Indonesia (Indonesian Cultural Institute). On September 17, 1962, it was handed over to the Indonesian government and became known as Museum Pusat (Central Museum). By decree of the Minister of Education and Culture No. 092/0/1979 May 28, 1979, it was renamed the Museum Nasional.

In the last quarter of the 20th century, the museum's manuscripts and literature collections were handed over to the National Library of Indonesia, while its fine arts collection, including paintings, was relocated to the National Gallery.

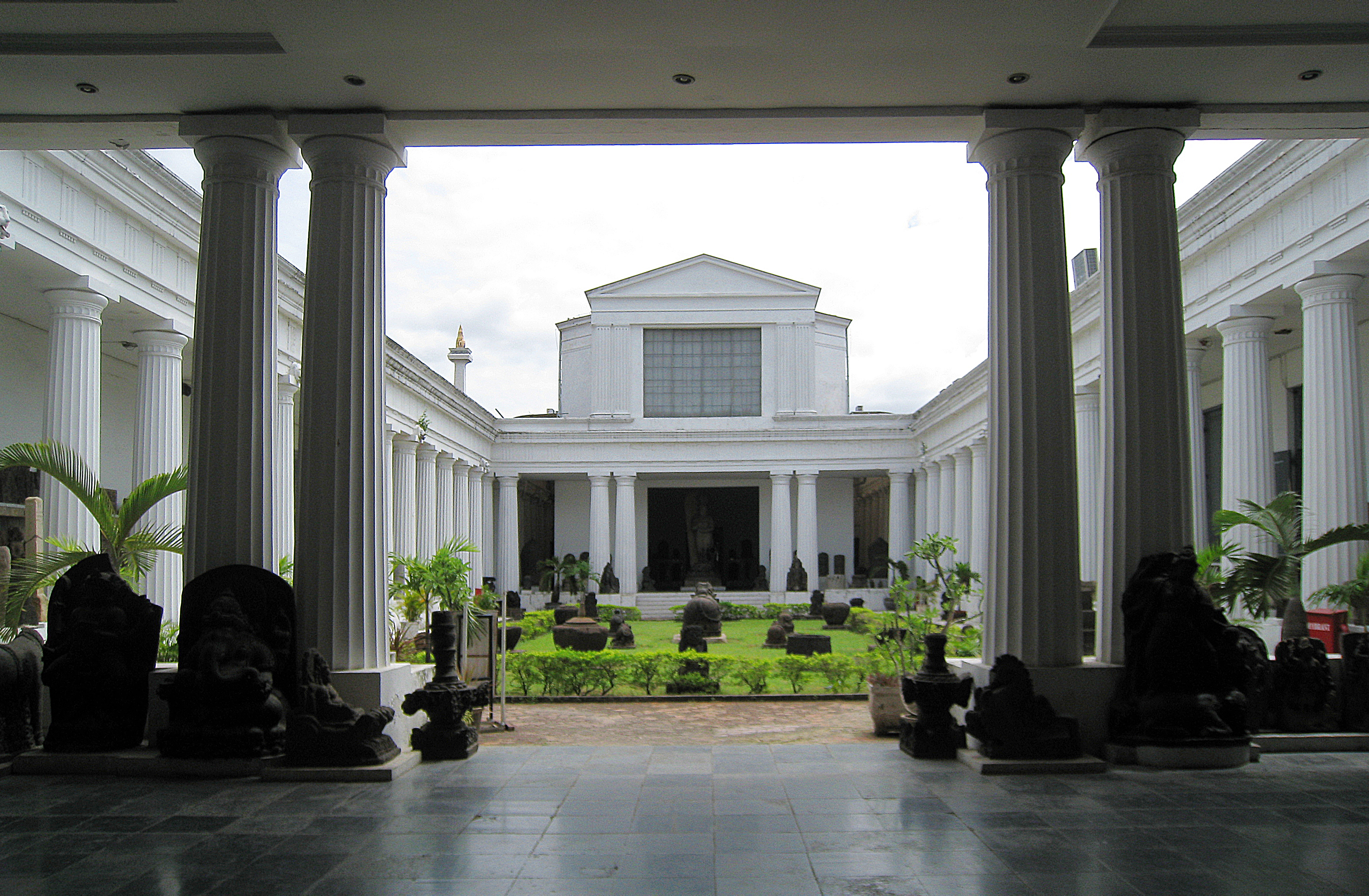
The peristyle (inner courtyard) of the National Museum features Doric order Greek architecture.

In 1977, an agreement between Indonesia and the Netherlands led to the repatriation of some cultural treasures to Indonesia. Among the prized treasures were the treasures of Lombok, the Nagarakretagama lontar manuscript, and an exquisite Prajnaparamita of Java statue. These are now kept in the National Museum of Indonesia.

In the 1980s there was a government policy to establish a museum negeri or state museum in every province of Indonesia. This idea came to reality in 1995 when all provinces of Indonesia had their state museums. Since then, all archaeological findings discovered in each province were not necessarily taken to the National Museum in Jakarta, but are kept and displayed in the state museums located in provincial capitals instead. Exceptions however applied to some highly important archaeological findings, such as the 10th-century Wonoboyo Hoard and the bronze Shiva statue.

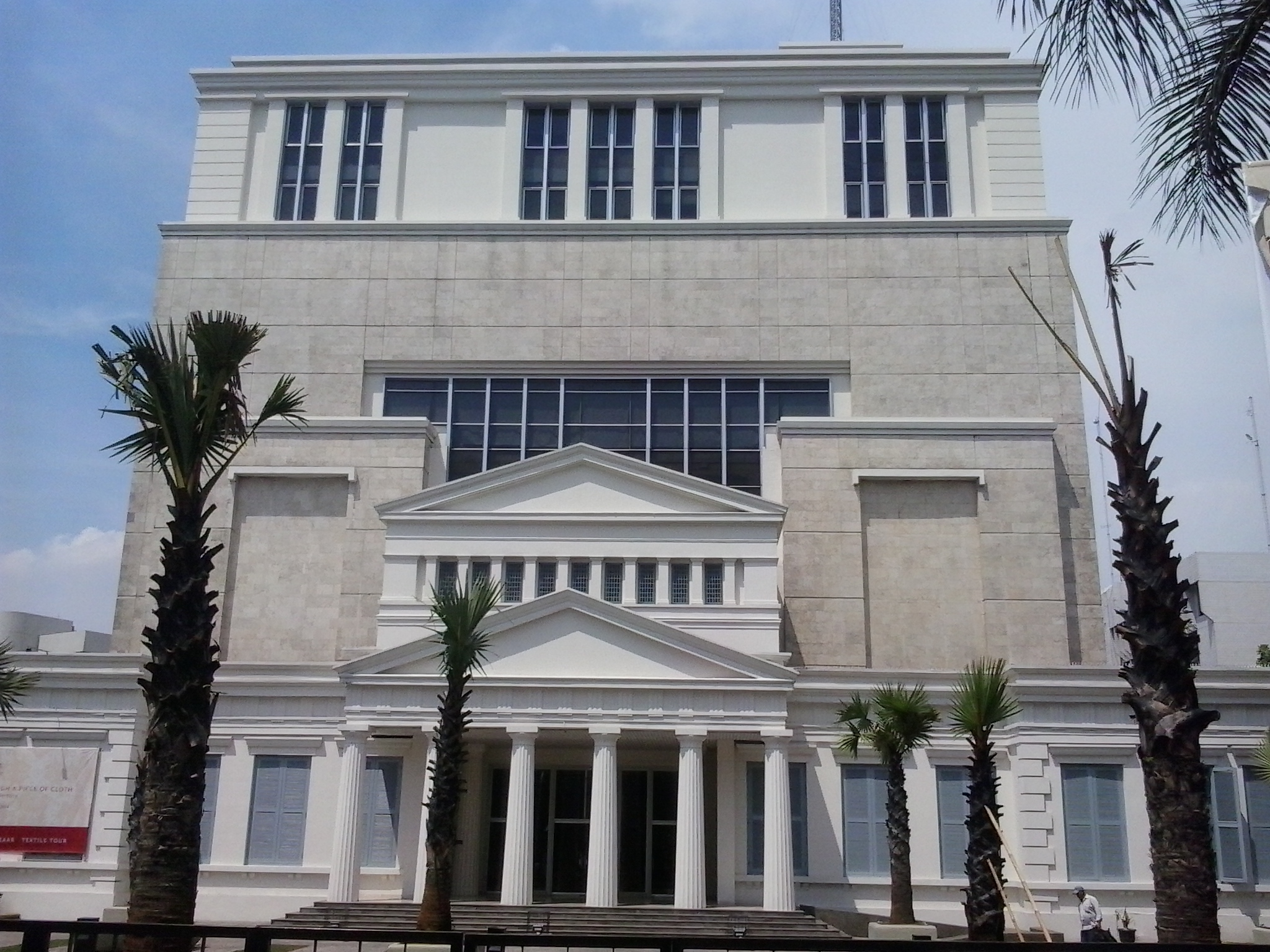
The four-storied new wing named Gedung Arca

In 2007, a new building to the north side of the existing building was opened, featuring many artifacts from prehistoric times to modern times. This new building, called Gedung Arca (Statue Building), provides a new exhibition wing. The old building is named Gedung Gajah (Elephant Building).

On September 11, 2013, four precious golden artifacts from the 10th-century Eastern Mataram kingdom period were stolen from the museum. The items were first discovered in the ruins of the Jalatunda ancient royal bathing place and in the temples on the slopes of Mount Penanggungan in Mojokerto Regency, East Java. The four missing artifacts were a dragon-shaped gold plaque, a scripted crescent-shaped gold plaque, and one golden-silver Harihara plaque, as well as a small golden box. All the missing items were displayed together in a glass showcase located inside the archaeology gold artifact and treasure room on the second floor of the Gedung Gajah (old wing).

Currently, there are two main buildings in the museum, Gedung A (Gedung Gajah or old wing) in the south, and Gedung B (Gedung Arca or the new wing) in the north. The third building, Gedung C, is planned as an extension to house and preserve the museum's extensive collection. By 2017, the old wing or Gedung Gajah was under major renovation, while Gedung C is under construction.

During his state visit to Indonesia in March 2020, King Willem-Alexander of the Netherlands returned the kris of Prince Diponegoro of Yogyakarta to Indonesia, which was received by President Joko Widodo. Diponegoro was the charismatic leader of a mass rebellion against Dutch colonial rule in Central Java. He was defeated and taken prisoner after the conclusion of the Java War in 1830. His kris was long considered lost but was located after being identified by the Dutch National Museum of Ethnology in Leiden. The extraordinary gold-inlaid Javanese dagger was previously held as part of the Dutch State Collection and is now part of the collection of the Indonesian National Museum.

On the night of September 16, 2023, a fire broke out in the Gedung Gajah building, causing the roof and the back walls of the building to collapse. Authorities said that at least four rooms in the building, which housed precolonial artifacts, were destroyed, and that the fire was brought under control without injuries within hours. The fire led to the museum being closed for renovation until it reopened on 15 October 2024 with an exhibition about the fire.

== Collections ==
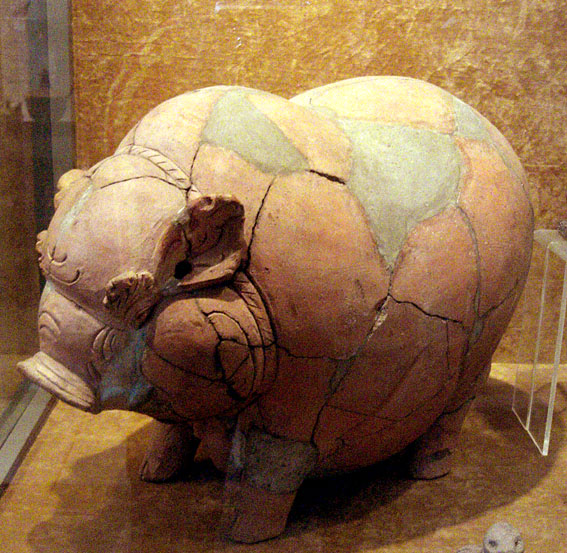
a Majapahit piggy bank from Trowulan, East Java

The museum has a collection of 61,600 prehistoric and anthropological artifacts and 5,000 archeological artifacts from all over Indonesia and Asia. The museum collection is among the richest, the most complete, and the best of its kind in Indonesia and one of the finest in Southeast Asia.

The museum acquired its collection by various means, including scientific expeditions, excavations of archaeological sites, acquisition of private collections, gifts from distinguished patrons, objects donated by religious missions – such as ethnological artifacts acquired by Christian Zending and Catholic missions – and treasures acquired from several Dutch East Indies military campaigns against indigenous kingdoms and polities in the archipelago. Treasures, among others from Java, Aceh, Lombok, and Bali acquired through Dutch colonial military expeditions, also made it to the collection of the Batavian Society and Leiden Museum, and today inherited by the National Museum.

The museum has comprehensive collections of stone statues from the classical Hindu-Buddhist period of ancient Java and Sumatra, a kaleidoscope of diverse collections of Indonesian ethnography artefacts, as well as extensive collections of Asian ceramics. The museum's pottery and ceramics collections in particular is quite remarkable, with a Chinese ceramics collection that includes pieces dating from the time of the Han (2nd century BC) to that of the Qing (18th century), complemented with ceramics from neighbouring Southeast Asian countries as well as local Indonesian pottery. It is the largest ceramic collection in Southeast Asia.

== Gedung Gajah (Old Wing) ==
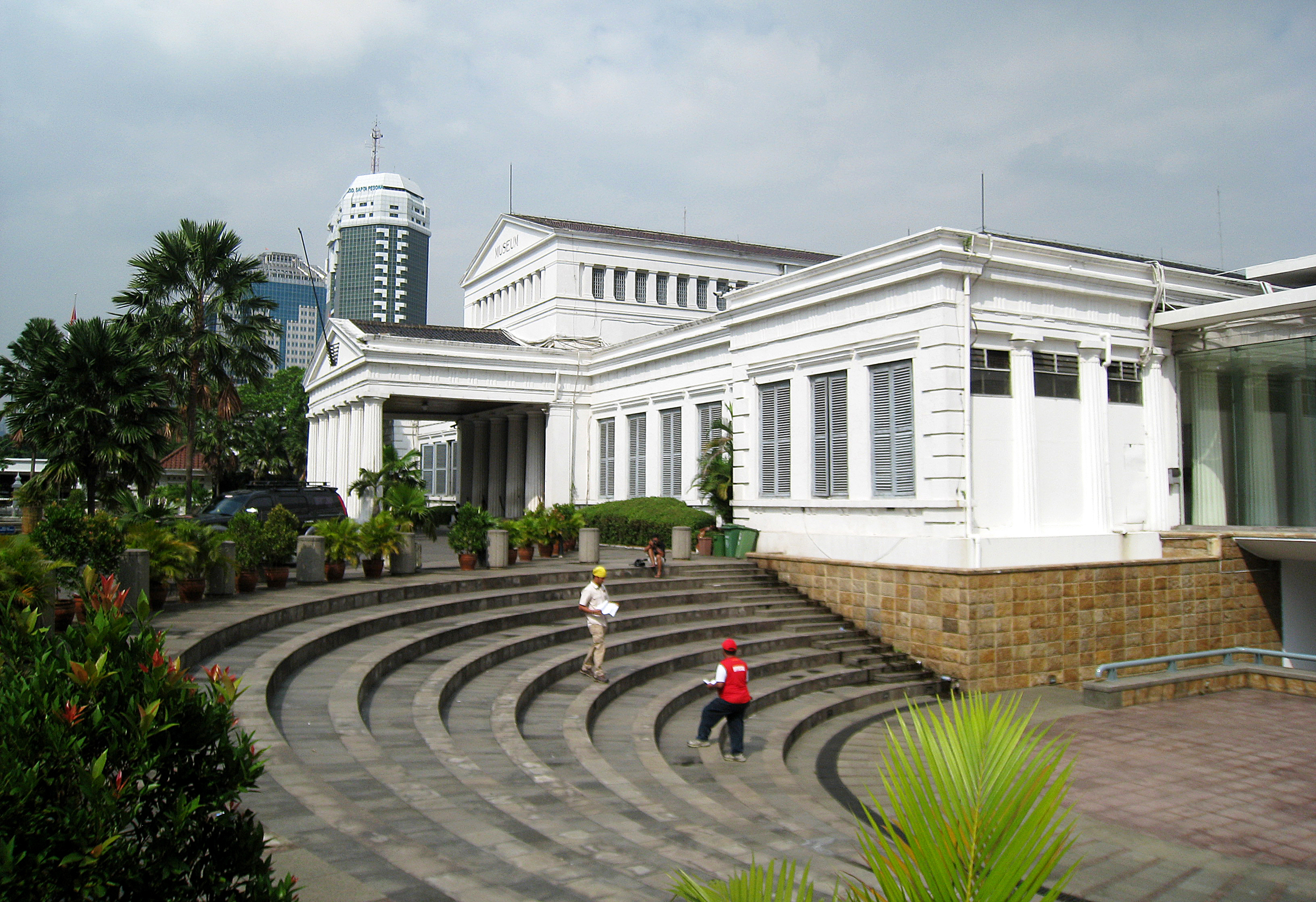
Gedung Gajah, the old wing of National Museum

The Gedung Gajah located on the south side, or left from the entrance, is the old wing and the original museum structure which was built during the colonial Dutch East Indies era. The building is popularly named gedung gajah (Indonesian for elephant building) about the bronze elephant statue in front of the building, was the gift of Siamese King Chulalongkorn. The museum collections are grouped and arranged by subjects:

=== Stone Sculpture Collection (Hindu-Buddhist Art of Ancient Indonesia) ===
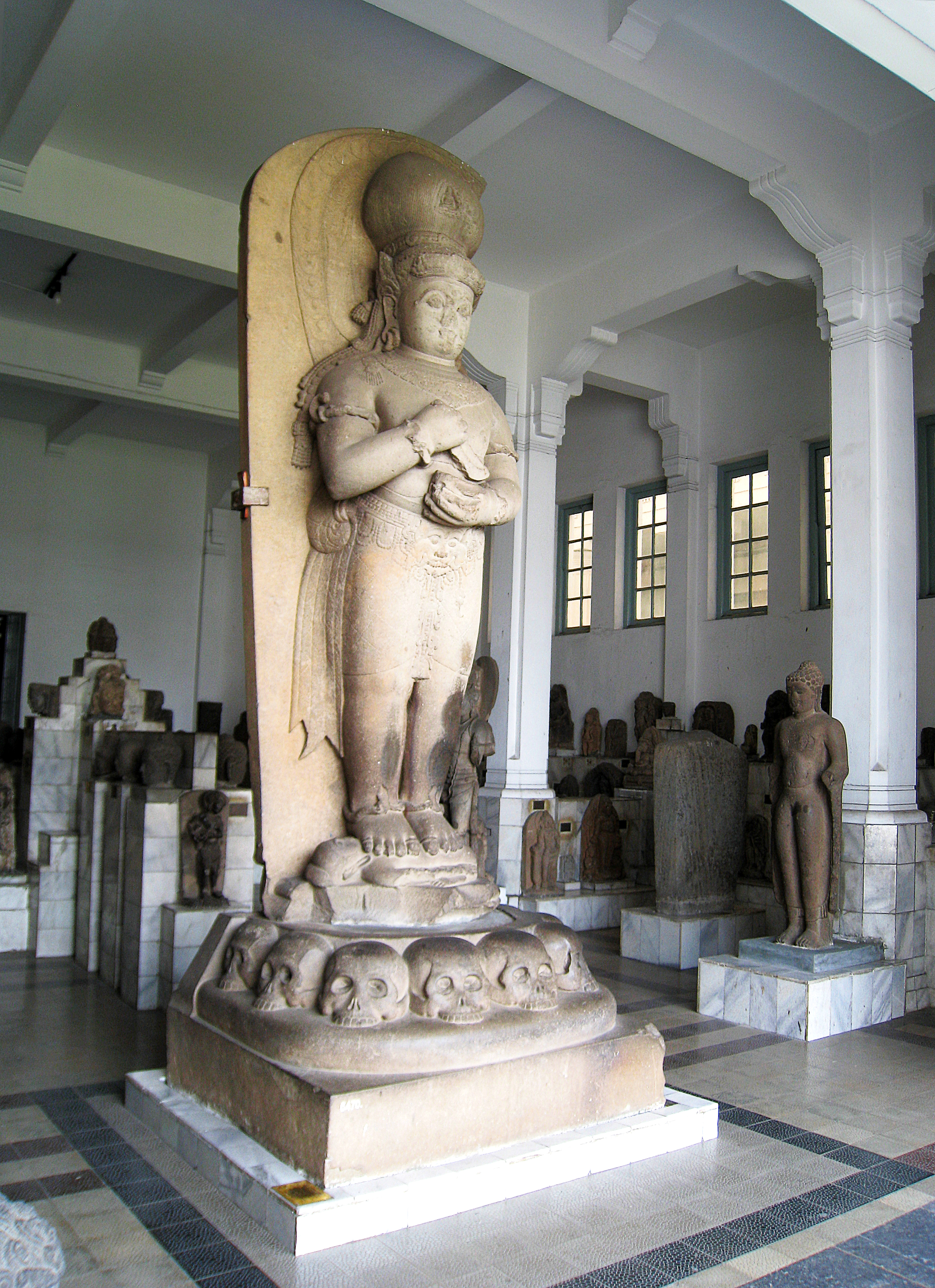
A 4.41 metres tall statue of Bhairava from Padangroco in West Sumatra, believed to be the depiction of King Adityavarman, among the museum's rich collections of Hindu-Buddhist artifacts of ancient Indonesia.

The National Museum of Indonesia has the richest and the largest collection of Hindu-Buddhist art of ancient Indonesia. The Hindu-Buddhist sculptures, relics, and inscriptions were collected from Java, Bali, Sumatra, and Borneo, dated from Tarumanagara period in the 5th century to Majapahit period in the 15th century, all are on display in the lobby, the central hall, and the central atrium of the museum.

The Buddha statues from Borobudur in various mudras are displayed in the lobby. The centerpiece collection also the largest artifact of the museum is the statue of Adityavarman depicted as Bhairava dated between 13th-14th century. This statue is more than 4 meters tall and weight 4 tons, and was discovered in 1935 in Padangroco, Sungai Langsat, Dharmasraya, West Sumatra. On 1937, the Dutch colonial government relocated it to this museum in Batavia.

Notable collections include the well-preserved 9th-century statues of Hindu deities taken from Banon Temple, which consists of Ganesha, Vishnu, Shiva, and Agastya. Several statues of Durga Mahisasuramardini discovered in Java, the Tarumanagaran Vishnu statue of Cibuaya, the Srivijayan Avalokiteshvara statue of Bingin Jungut, the Avalokiteshvara head of Aceh, the head statues from Bima temple of Dieng. Some Buddhist statues from Singhasari period also displayed here, such as the statues of Buddhist deities from Jago Temple near Malang, East Java. The large open air atrium courtyard in the center surrounded by peristyle gallery displaying numbers of large statues such as statues of Nandi bull, stone jars and also several makaras taken from Java and Jambi. The statue of Harihara, dated from the Majapahit period taken from Simping temple, and the statue of Parvati taken from Rimbi Temple are among important Majapahit relics. Numbers of inscriptions are also stored and displayed in this section, including Telaga Batu, Amoghapasa, and Anjuk Ladang inscriptions.

=== Treasure Rooms (Archaeology and Ethnography Collection) ===
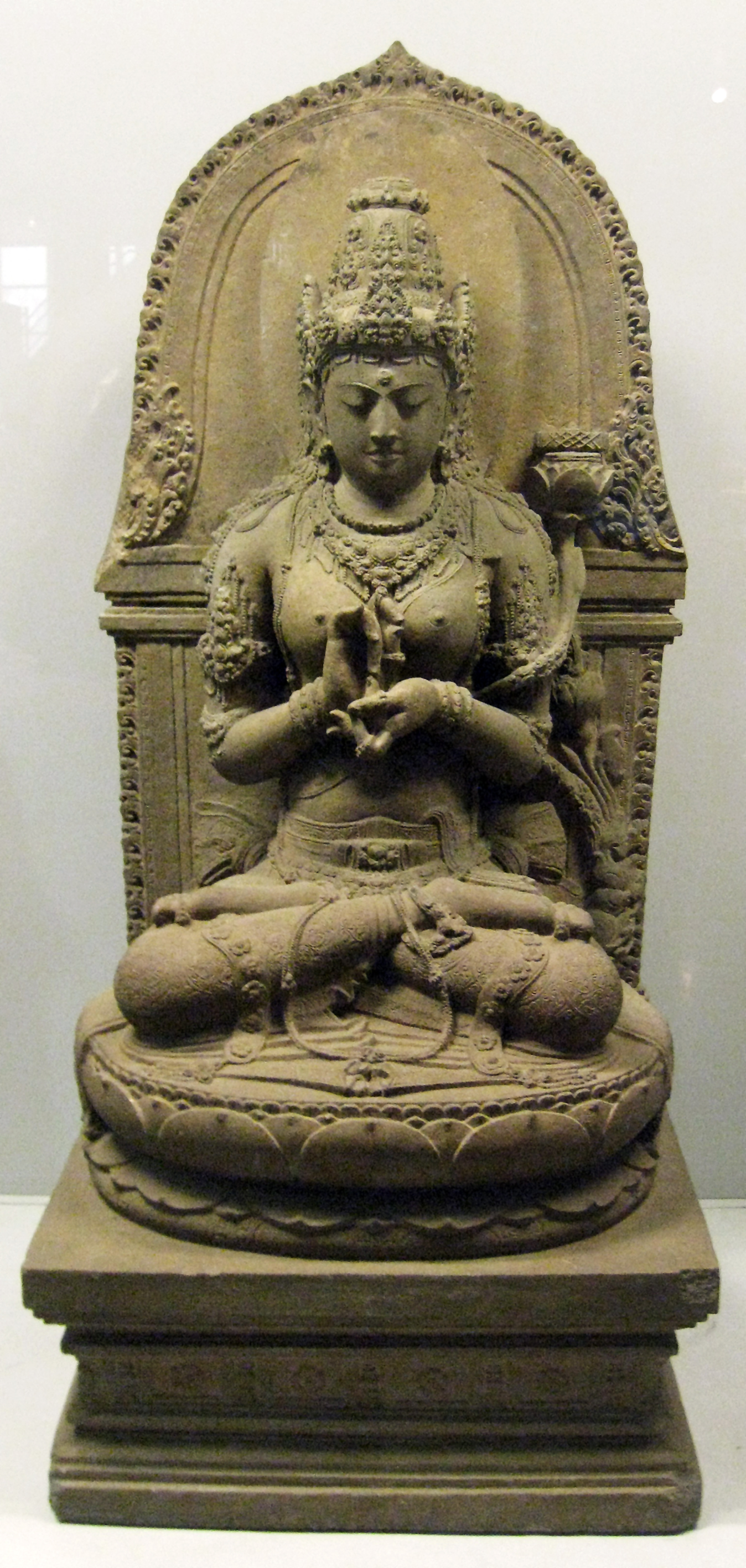
Prajnaparamita, the Buddhist goddess of transcendental wisdom, is the masterpiece of ancient Java art, displayed in treasure room.

The second floor of the museum features treasures, gold, and precious artifacts arranged in two rooms: archaeological treasure and ethnological treasure.

The archaeological treasure room features ancient gold and precious relics acquired from archaeological findings, mostly originating from ancient Java. One of the most prized collections of the museum is a statue of Prajnaparamita. Dubbed the most beautiful sculpture of ancient Java, the goddess of transcendental wisdom is displayed at the entrance of the archaeology treasure room to show how gold jewelry and precious ornaments were worn on the body. Such ancient gold adornments were on display; such as crowns, ear adornments, earrings, rings, bracelets, kelat bahu (arm bracelet), leg bracelets, waistbands, bellybands, upawita or tali kasta (golden chains worn across the chest).

One of the most valuable treasures of ancient Java was the famous Wonoboyo hoard, which originated from the 9th-century Hindu Mataram kingdom discovered in Wonoboyo, Klaten, Central Java, near Prambanan. The hoard, consisting of a bowl with a scene from the Ramayana, a purse, a water dipper, an umbrella finial, and a spoon or ladle, all were made of gold. Also discovered were ancient Javanese gold coins shaped similarly to a corn seed.

Golden, silver, and bronze Hindu-Buddhist relics are also on display, such as the Hindu god's images made from gold leaf, bronze statue of Shiva Mahadeva with gold applied on his lips and third eye, the bronze statue of Avalokiteshvara and also the silver statue of youthful Manjusri. This 9th-century silver statue of Manjusri was discovered in Ngemplak, Simongan, Semarang, demonstrating Pala art influence in Java as well as a fine example of silver art in ancient Java.

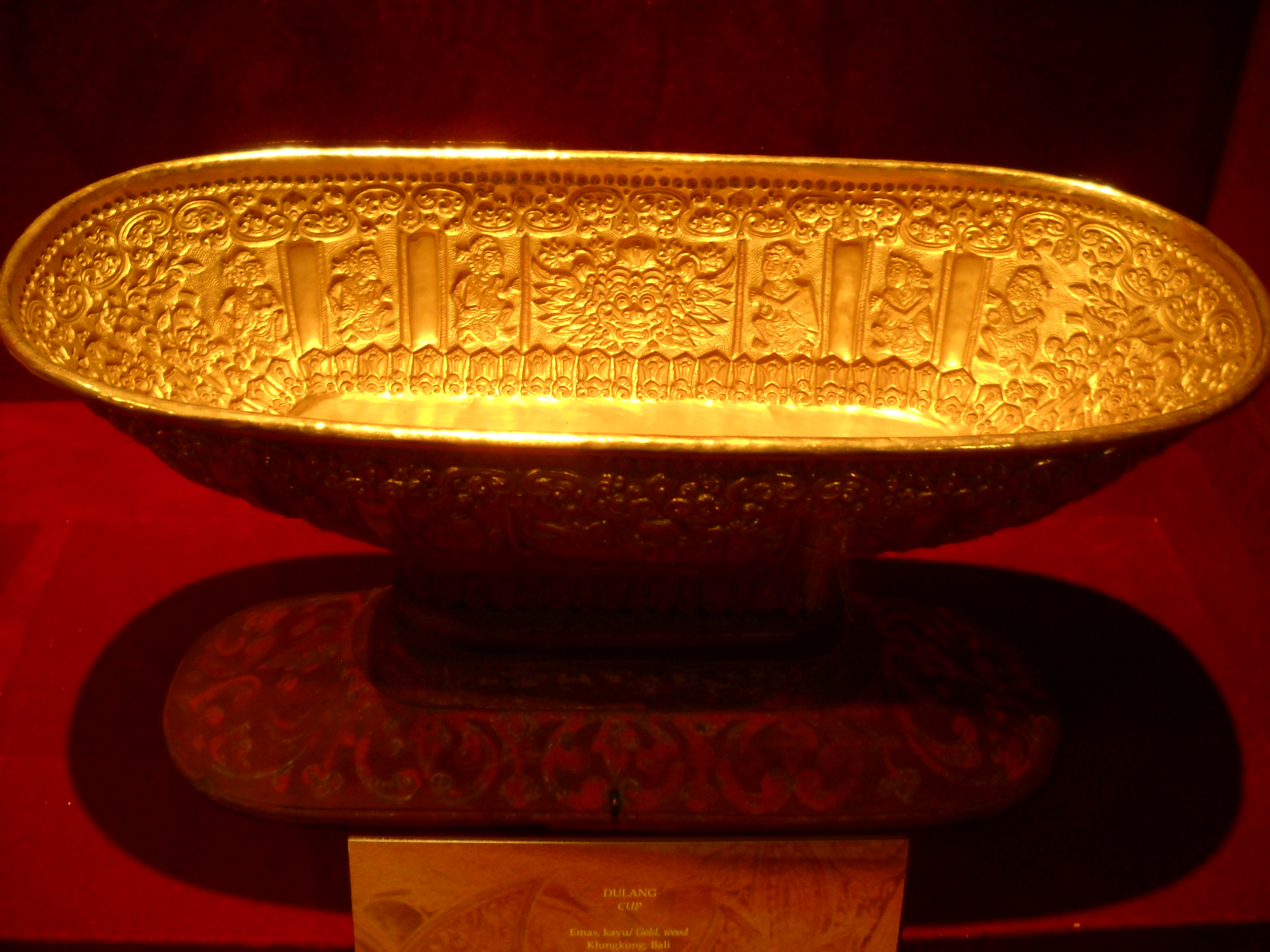
Dulang golden cup of Puri Klungkung, Bali

The ethnology treasure room features treasures acquired from royal houses of Indonesia, such as regalias from various istanas, kratons and puri of the Indonesian archipelago. Most of these pusaka royal regalias and treasures were acquired or looted, during Dutch East Indies military campaigns against the archipelago's regional kingdoms, that took place between the 19th to early 20th centuries; including the royal houses of Banten, Banjarmasin, Bali and Lombok.

The royal regalia and treasures are arranged in several island zones: Sumatra, Java, Bali, Borneo, Sulawesi, and Eastern Indonesia (Nusa Tenggara, Maluku and Papua). The ethnology treasure room display various royal precious objects such as golden jewelries, ceremonial containers and weapons. The jewelries are bracelets and rings embedded with rubies, diamond, precious and semi precious stones. The collections are gilded Balinese kris weapon embedded with precious and semi precious stones and various spear heads. Golden royal crowns, gilded throne, golden royal regalia, golden tobacco container, golden cup, Pekinangan (silver betel-nut set), sword and golden shield is among the collection of the treasure room.

=== Ceramics collection ===
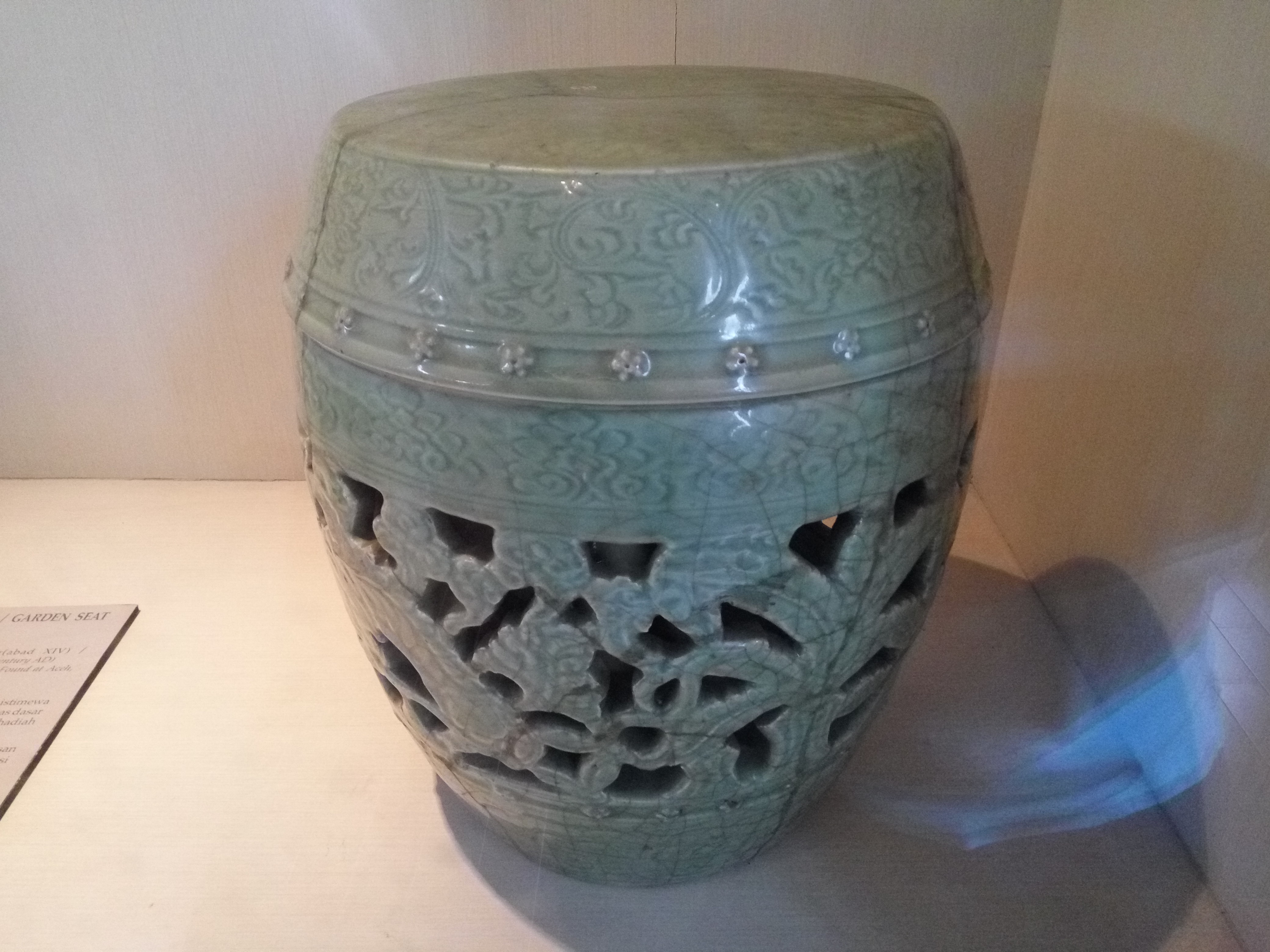
A porcelain garden seat from 14th century Yuan-Ming dynasty found in Aceh

The collection of ceramics ranges from prehistoric Buni culture, Majapahit terracota, to the ceramics of China, Japan, Vietnam, Thailand, and Myanmar. Majapahit terracota water vessels, statues, roof tiles to piggy bank are on display. The museum houses a large and complete collection of ancient Chinese ceramics. It has one of the most complete collections of Chinese ceramics discovered outside China, which date from the Han, Tang, Sung, Yuan, Ming, and Qing dynasties. This collection gives insight into Indonesia's maritime trade over the centuries. Research indicates that the Chinese sailed to India via Indonesia as early as Western Han period (205 BC to 220 AD) as part of maritime silk road and that firm trade relations were subsequently established.

The ceramics collection gathered since 1932 is mainly from the collection of E.W. van Orsoy de Flines, who was also the first curator of this collection until he was repatriated to the Netherlands in 1957. Because he was so fond of this extensive ceramics collection — which reached more than 5 thousands pieces in quantity — he refused to divide them up, so he left all the collection intact in the National Museum's custody. This collection that dates back from Han (2nd century BC) to the time of Qing (18th century) is the largest ceramic collection in Southeast Asia.

After 2000, the ceramics collection increased significantly from the addition of ceramics retrieved from shipwrecks in Indonesian waters. The latest collection was the ceramics taken from the Cirebon shipwreck discovered in 2003.

=== Ethnography collection ===
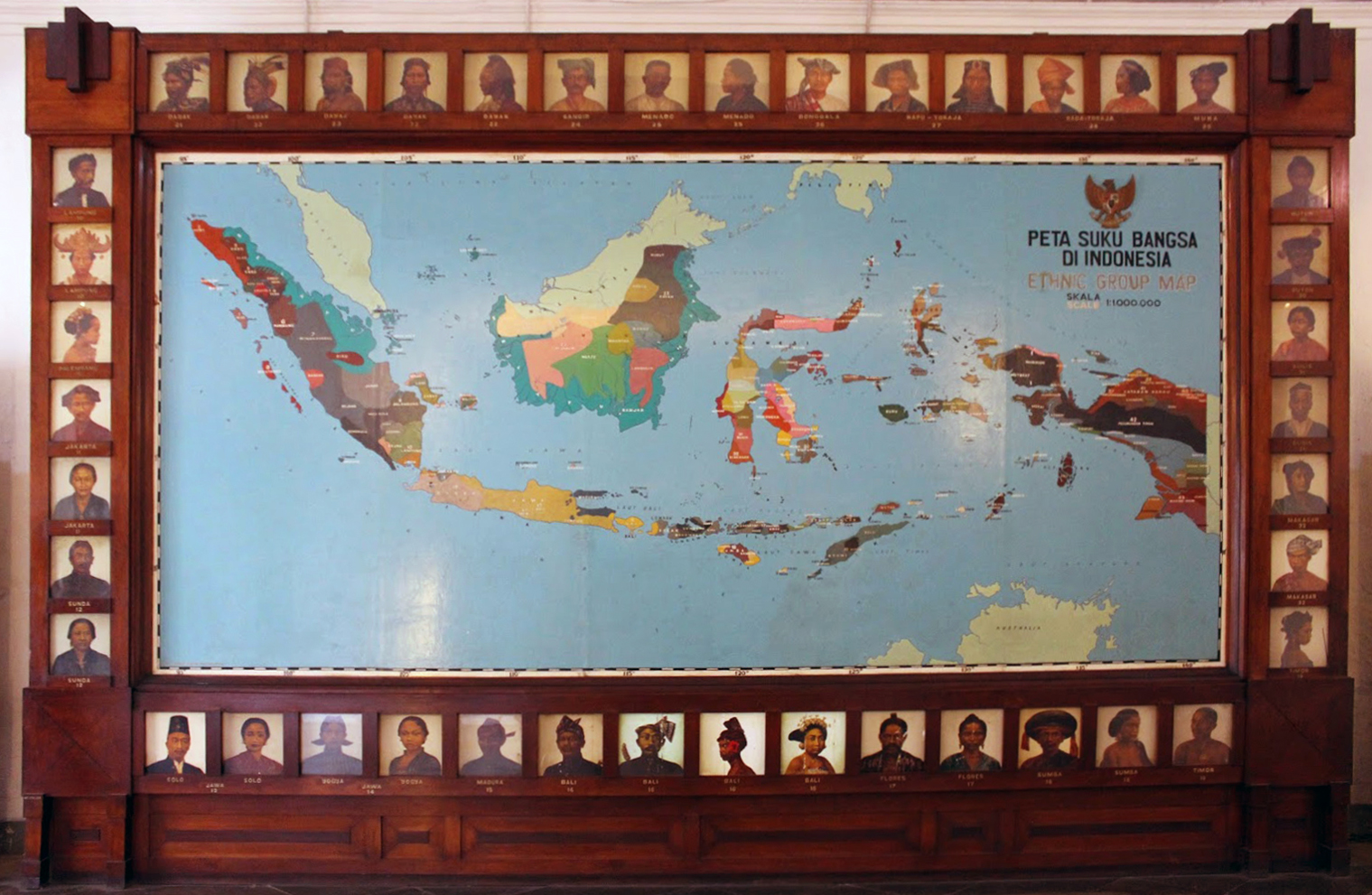
A large map depicting Indonesian ethnic groups displayed in the ethnology room; the portraits of native Indonesians are displayed surrounding the map.

The ethnography collection comprises a wide variety of objects that are part of Indonesian daily life as well as exhibits that are used in ceremonies and rituals. The collection is arranged according to geographic locations of each region and island within the Indonesian archipelago: from Sumatra, Java, Kalimantan, Bali, Lesser Sunda Islands (Nusa Tenggara), to Sulawesi, Maluku, and Papua.

Examples of ancient cultures include Nias and Batak in Sumatra, the Badui in Java, Balinese, the Dayak of Kalimantan, the Toraja in Sulawesi, and the Asmat and Dani in Papua. The lifestyles of these people remain unchanged after centuries and follow the same patterns as that of their ancestors. They still use some traditional laws (adat) to determine their daily activities and ceremonies.

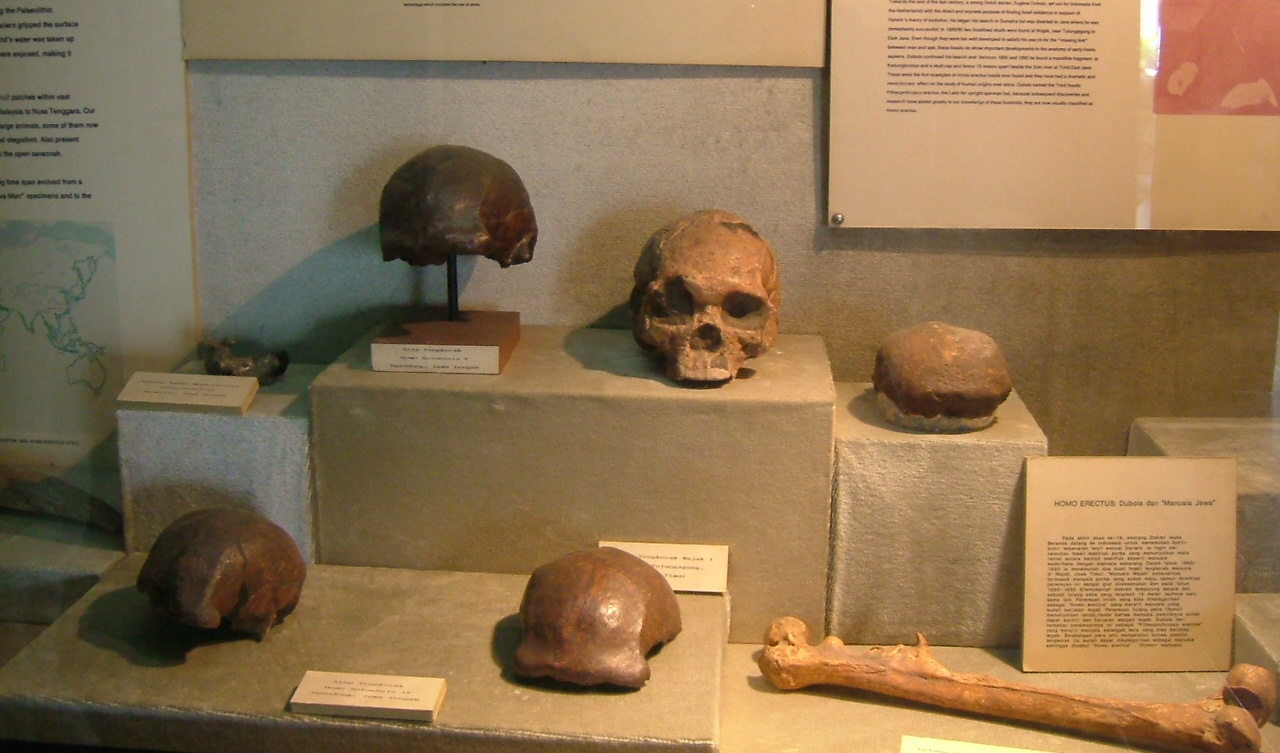
The skull of Java Man (Homo erectus)

=== Prehistory collection ===
The museum stores some Stone Age artifacts such as fossiled skull and skeleton of Homo erectus, Homo floresiensis and Homo sapiens, stone tools, menhir, beads, stone axe, bronze ceremonial axe and Nekara (bronze drum), also ancient weapons from Indonesia.

=== Historical Relics Collection (Colonial Era Collection) ===
The front room of the museum features old relics of colonial Indonesia, from the era of Dutch East Indies Company (VOC) to Dutch East Indies. Most of the collections are antique colonial furnitures. However most of the collections has been moved to Jakarta History Museum that mostly features the history of Jakarta especially the colonial history of Batavia (old Jakarta).

=== Other Collections ===
- Bronze Collection
- Textile Collection
- Numismatics Collection

== Gedung Arca (New Wing) ==
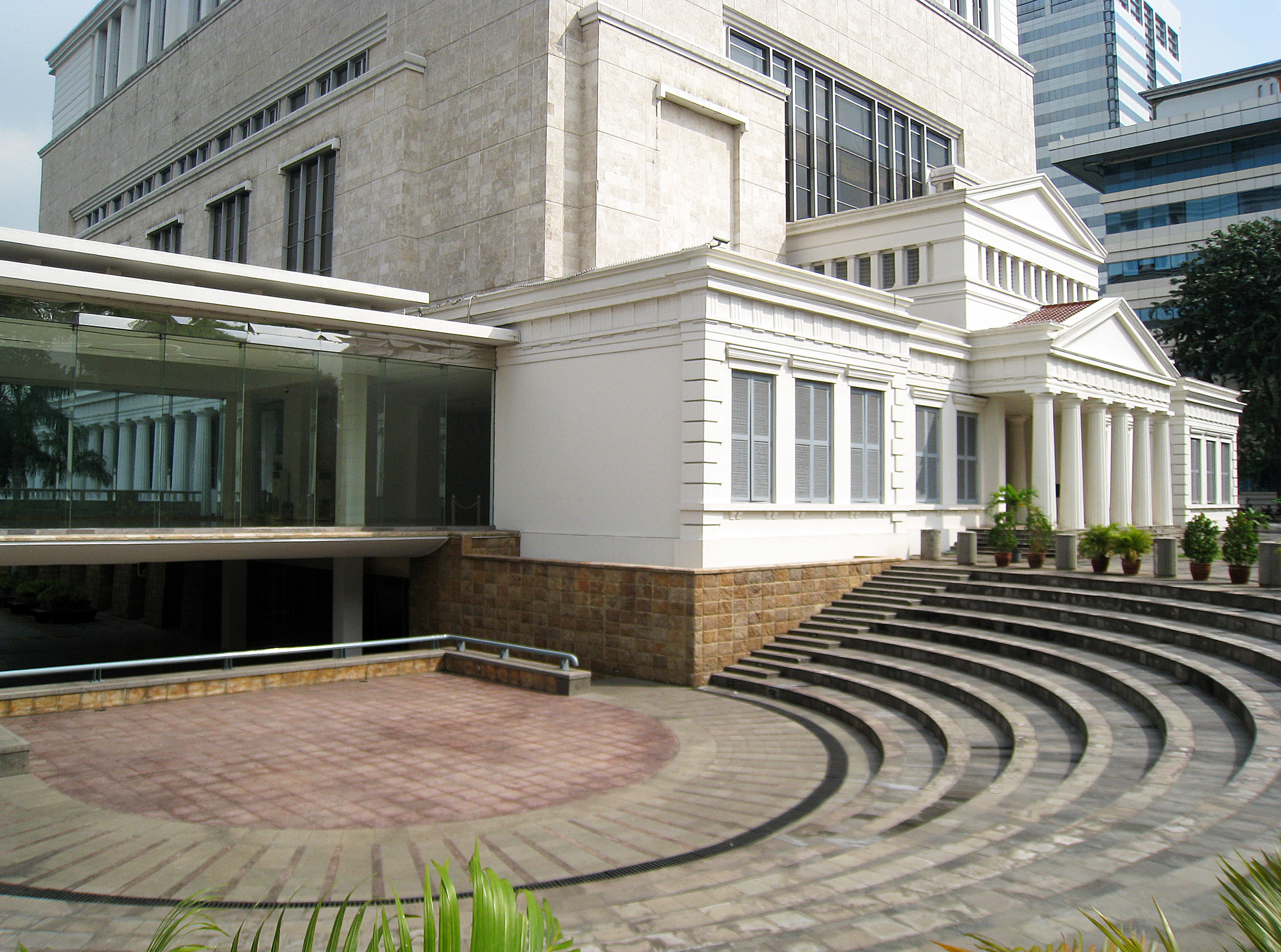
Gedung Arca, the new wing of National Museum

The new wing called Gedung Arca, located immediately north of the old wing, was inaugurated by President Susilo Bambang Yudhoyono on 20 June 2007. The National Museum expansion and the construction of the new wing commenced in 1994, under the initiative of the Minister of Education and Culture Wardiman Djojonegoro. The four-story building is a combination of colonial and modern styles, with the Greek neoclassical facade mirroring the old wing.

Unlike the exhibition layout of the older building, the new building’s permanent exhibit is based on the frameworks of cultural elements, which Prof. Koentjaraningrat classified into seven substances of culture:

1. Religious system and religious ceremony
2. Societal systems and organization
3. Knowledge systems
4. Language
5. Arts
6. Livelihood systems
7. Technology and tool systems

The new north wing consists of a basement and seven levels (floors), four of which host permanent exhibitions, while other levels function as the Museum office. The layout of the four levels is as follows:

1. Level 1: Man and Environment
2. Level 2: Knowledge, Technology and Economy
3. Level 3: Social Organization and Settlement Patterns
4. Level 4: Treasures and Ceramics

The old building and the new wing are connected via the old ethnography room through a glass walled bridge gallery. The bridge gallery is located over the outdoor amphitheatre. Temporary exhibitions often take place in this connecting gallery. A cafeteria and souvenir stall are located in the ground floor. The basement floor hosts the ASEAN room that features a photo exhibition and artifacts from 10 ASEAN countries.

=== Temporary exhibition ===
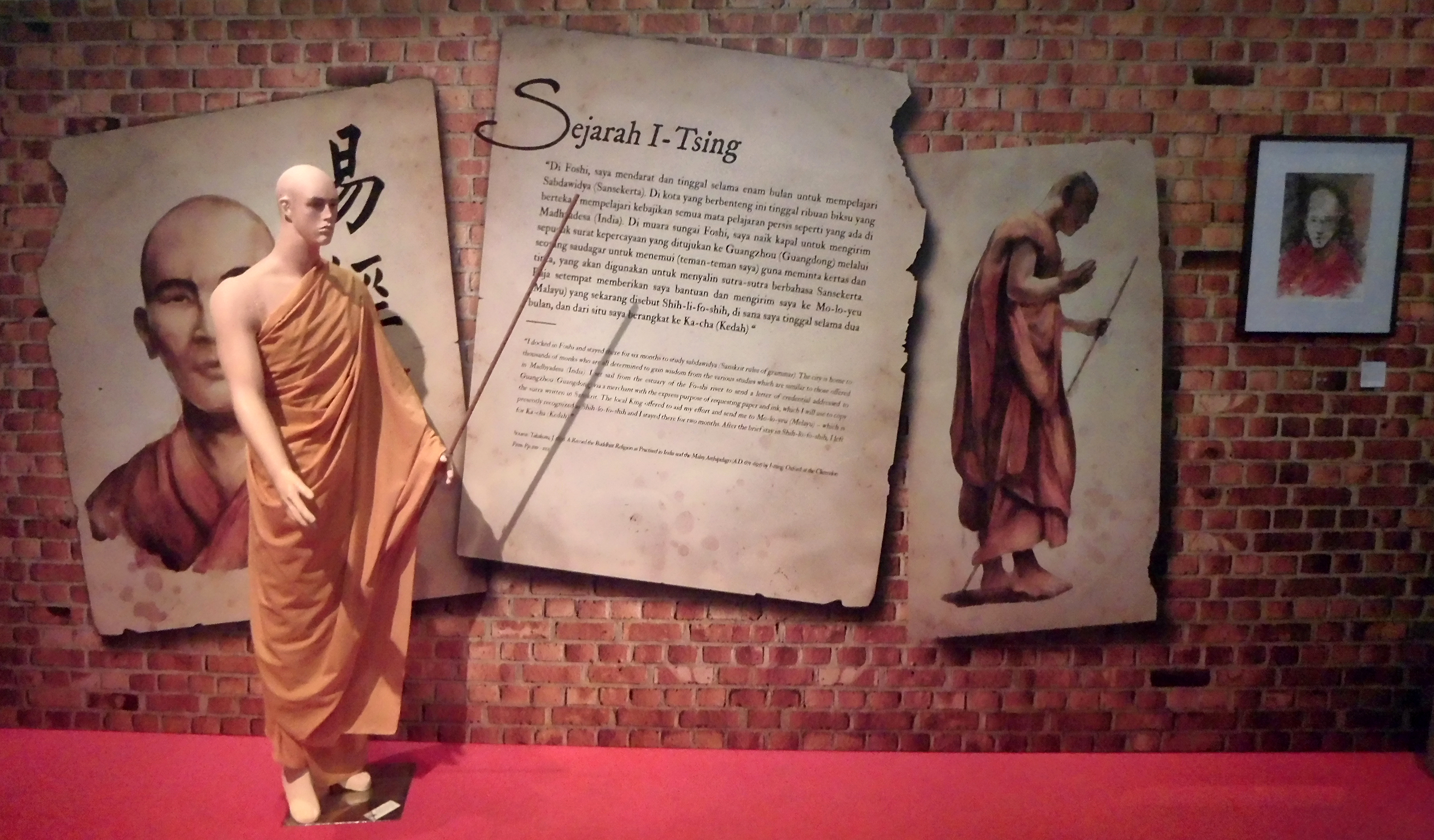
The depiction of I-Tsing (Yi Jing) a 7th-century Chinese Buddhist monk pilgrim. Displayed in Kedatuan Sriwijaya temporary exhibition, November 2017, in the National Museum.

The Gedung Arca also houses two temporary exhibition halls, one in the ground floor and another is in the basement floor. This temporary exhibition is usually held for several weeks to a month, with specific focus of interest. For example, the specific exhibitions of Indonesian ancient empires; the Majapahit Exhibition in 2007 and the Srivijaya Exhibition in 2017.

The Majapahit Exhibition in 2007 was meant to revisit the archaeological aspect, cultural and historic legacy of Majapahit as the center of a great civilization in the archipelago. The artefacts displayed in this exhibition included the Negarakretagama manuscript, the statue of Raden Wijaya depicted as Harihara from Candi Simping, pottery, ceramics, temple bas-reliefs and building foundations dating from the Majapahit period. The Kedatuan Sriwijaya exhibition held in November 2017 focussed on the Srivijaya maritime empire in its relation to global spice trade.

== Indonesian Heritage Society ==
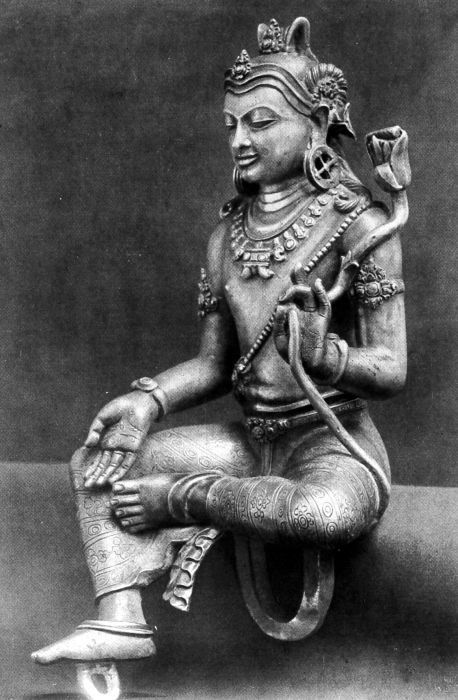
A 9th-century silver statue of Manjusri, discovered in Ngemplak, Simongan, Semarang. Collection of the National Museum.

The Indonesian Heritage Society is a non-profit organization which promotes interest in and knowledge of Indonesia's cultural heritage. Formed by and for members of the multinational community of Jakarta in 1970, it is involved in projects supporting the National Museum. Activities include:

- 2 series of six lectures each year
- Study groups
- Library
- Publishing of books, a quarterly newsletter, calendars etc.
- Sales

Activities related to the museum include:

- Museum tours (in English, French, Japanese and Korean)
- Volunteer translation of museum documents
- School programs – presentations at English and Japanese international schools
- Project groups

Similarly, the IHS supports the Jakarta History Museum, Textile Museum and Maritime Museum.

== See also ==
- List of museums and cultural institutions in Indonesia
- List of national museums
- Indonesia Museum
- National Museum of Ethnology (Netherlands)
- Tropenmuseum
- Bangkok National Museum

== Literature ==
- Lenzi, Iola (2004). Museums of Southeast Asia. Singapore: Archipelago Press. p. 200. ISBN 981-4068-96-9.
