= Royal Batavian Society of Arts and Sciences =

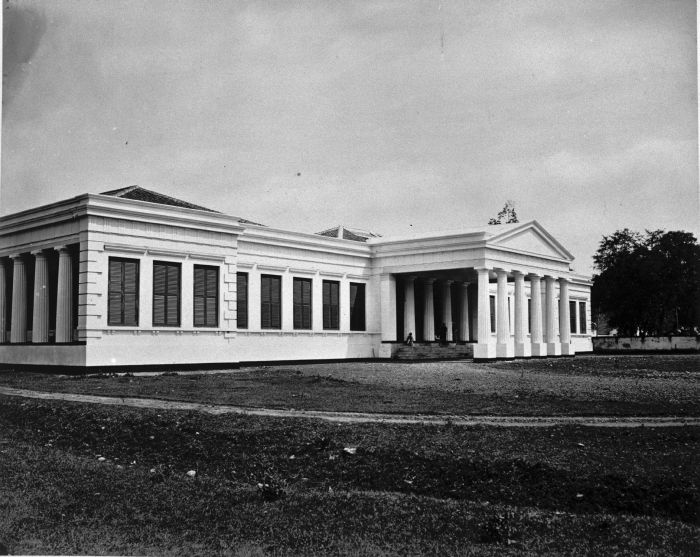
Museum of the Royal Batavian Society of Arts and Sciences c.1875–1885, now the National Museum of Indonesia

The Royal Batavian Society of Arts and Sciences (Dutch: Koninklijk Bataviaasch Genootschap van Kunsten en Wetenschappen, 1778–1962) was a Dutch learned society in Batavia (now Jakarta, Indonesia).

The society was founded in 1778 by naturalist Jacob Cornelis Matthieu Radermacher as the Bataviaasch Genootschap der Kunsten en Wetenschappen (Batavian Society of Arts and Sciences) and granted the Koninklijk status and thus assumed its currently referred name in 1910.

After Indonesian independence in 1949, it was renamed the Lembaga Kebudajaan Indonesia in 1950, and 1962 ceased operation. Its collection is now in the Museum Nasional.

== History ==
A young VOC official—J.C.M Radermacher was interested in arts and sciences in the Indies. Radermacher suggested the establishment of an association in Batavia similar to the Hollandsche Maatschappij der Wetenschappen [HMW] in Haarlem. Initially, this suggestion was not received well until 1777 when during the commemoration of 25 years of HMW there was an intention to open the branch in the colony. The association was an independent scientific association established in Batavia.

On 24 April 1778, an association was established in Batavia named Bataviaasch Genootschap der Kunsten en Wetenschappen (Batavian Society of Arts and Sciences), often abbreviated as BG. Governors-general and high officials of VOC were designated as members of the board of directors and society key figures were to become members of the association. The motto of Bataviaasch Genootschap (BG) was Ten Nutte van Het Gemeen (For Public's Best Interest). The main objective of BG was to analyze the cultural and scientific aspects of the East Indies, including its society and natural environment, through facilitating research conducted by experts.

== Subjects ==
At first, the scope of activity of BG was quite general; among others were natural science, ethnography, history, manuscript and literature, agriculture, and medication. The role of the institution as the colonial government's consultant has grown more prominent; especially in the field of archaeology and the preservation of ancient sites in Java—before the establishment of the Archaeological Service in 1913. Since the mid-19th century, however, the scope was narrowed down to exclude natural science subjects that were taken over by a more specific Physics Association. BG would concentrate only on the subjects of language and literature, archaeology and history, as well as ethnography and anthropology.

== Journals and publications ==
The association was quite productive, published scientific articles and journals; Verhandelingen van het Bataviaasch Genootschap van Kunsten en Wetenschappen (VBG, published from 1779 to 1950) and Tijdschrift voor Indische taal-land en volkenkunde (TBG, published in 1853 to 1952). The association's administrative reports are published in Notulen van Bataviaasch Genootschap (NBG).

== Museum collections ==
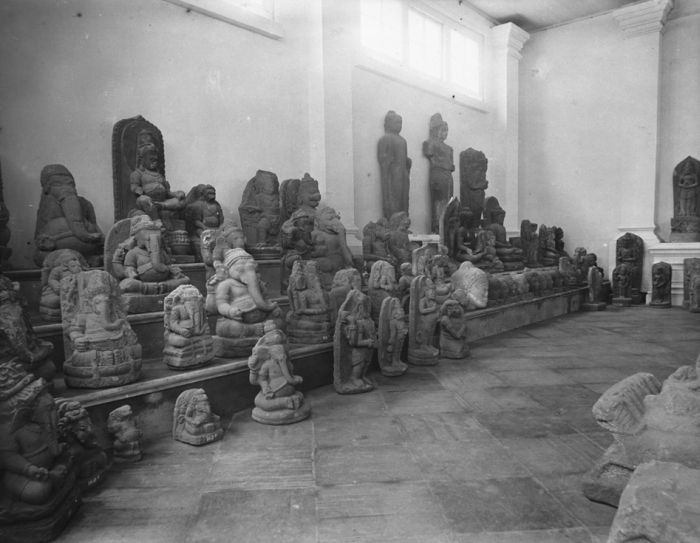
The Hindu-Buddhist statue collection of Batavian Society, circa 1896.

Since its establishment, the Batavian Society has started gathering the collection acquired from the contributions of its members. The initial collection was much owed to its founder, J.C.M. Radermacher who contributed his house at De Groote Rivier Street along with his collection of books, manuscripts, musical instruments, currency, flora samples of dried plants, etc. At that time, collecting and donating curious rare, and unique objects is regarded as a commendable endeavour, intellectually fashionable, and prestigious activity among the social elites in Batavia. Therefore, the society's collection increased significantly. Since 1779, the society decided to exhibit its collection for the public, although restricted only to Wednesdays from 8 to 10:00. This was the seed of the museum activity. The members of BG were allowed to borrow the SBG's book collection with a time limit of up to 3 weeks.

During British rule, Stamford Raffles donated an additional building located behind the Societeit de Harmonie hall to store the large sum of collections that were insufficiently stored in the De Groote Rivier building. Meanwhile, the collection grew significantly greater due to the addition of a zoology collection in the form of preserved mammals, birds, seashells, etc.

In 1822, Governor-General G.A. Baron van der Capellen issued a decree to form a commission to search for important objects in Java and sent them to the Batavian Society. The policy to increase the museum collection was pushed further by Governor-General J.C. Baud's (1833-1836) decree that instructed the government officials throughout the Dutch East Indies to assist in searching for important objects for the Batavian Society museum collection.

The surge in collection was not always beneficial to the Batavian Society of Arts and Sciences since it meant an increase in maintenance costs and storage space. To reduce its collections, therefore, in 1843 part of the zoology collection was sent out to the Ethnology Museum in Leiden, while the rest was auctioned. In 1850, the geological and mineralogy collection was sent to the newly established Physics Association.

In 1855, a law regarding Treasure Discovery was enacted; stipulating that all archaeological findings in the Indies had to be reported to the government, and the Batavian Society museum might buy it at the price according to an appropriate appraisal.

By the mid-19th century, the Batavian Society museum building in Harmoni was also considered insufficient to store and exhibit the growing collection. Although the plan to build a new museum had been conceived in 1836, it was not until 1862 that the new museum finally came into reality. With the patronage of King Willem III, the colonial government built a new building on the present location of the National Museum at Jalan Merdeka Barat 12. The original building was built in Greek Neoclassical architecture, and originally it had no second floor.

The museum acquired its collection in many ways, among others through scientific expeditions, archaeological sites, acquisition of private collections, gifts from distinguished patrons, objects donated by religious missions; such as ethnological artifacts acquired by Christian Zending and Catholic Missions, and also treasures acquired — or looted to be exact — from several military expeditions led by Dutch East Indies military throughout the archipelago against indigenous kingdoms and polities. Treasures, among others from Aceh, Lombok, and Bali acquired through the military expeditions led by the Dutch colonial government, also made it to the collection of the Batavian Society and Leiden Museum.

== Other institutions established by the society ==
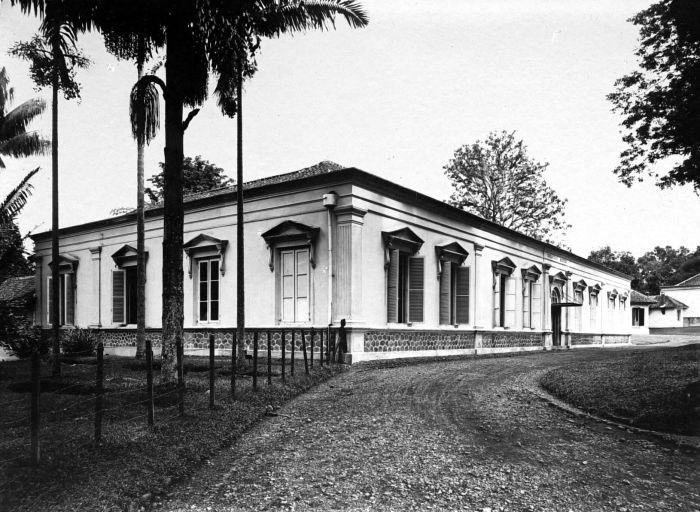
The Zoological Museum of Bogor was established in 1894 by the Batavian Society of Arts and Sciences.

The society made the plans for the Hortus Botanicus Bogoriense in Bogor in 1817. The Zoological Museum of Bogor (Museum Zoologicum Bogorinse) was established by the Batavia Society of Arts and Sciences in Bogor, Indonesia in 1894. The Bibliotheca Bogoriense (Bogor Library) made Bogor into an important center of biological science.

== See also ==
- List of museums in Indonesia

== Additional sources ==
- G. Kolff, Feestbundel uitgegeven door het Koninklijk Bataviaasch Genootschap van Kunsten en Wetenschappen bij gelegenheid van zijn 150 jarig bestaan, 1778-1928, published in two volumes in by the Society, Weltevreden (Indonesia), 1929.
- J.P.M. Groot, Van de Grote Rivier naar het Koningsplein : het Bataviaasch Genootschap van Kunsten en Wetenschappen, 1778-1867 (= proefschrift). Leiden, 2006.
- Scholarly Societies Project
