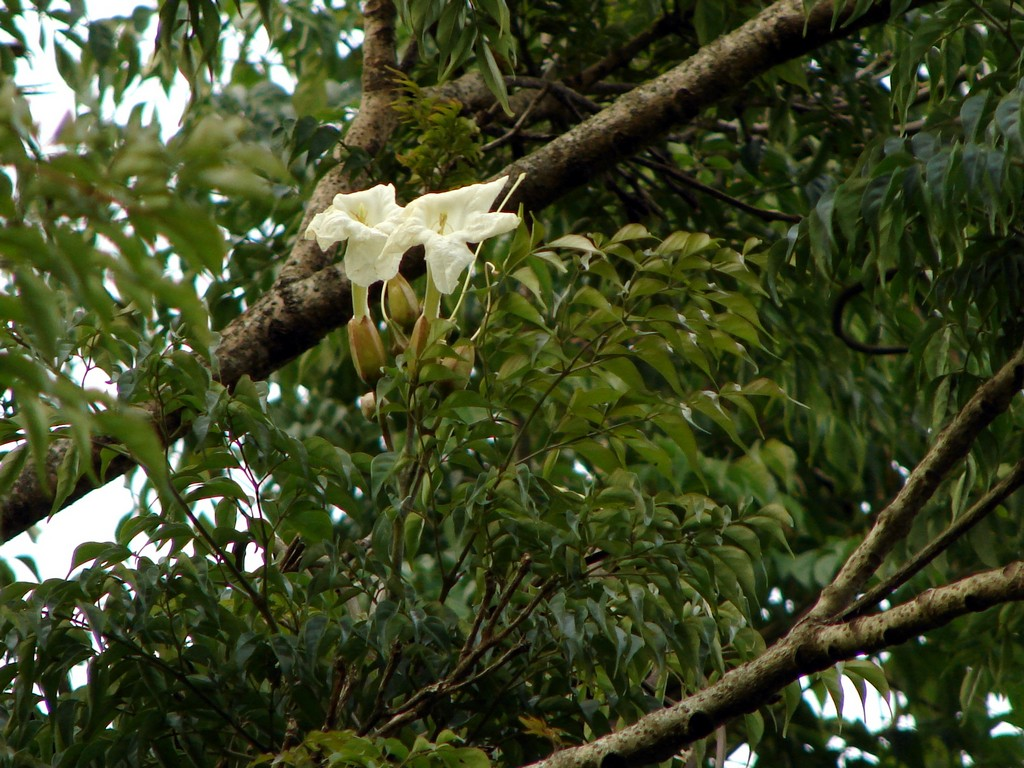
- Flowers
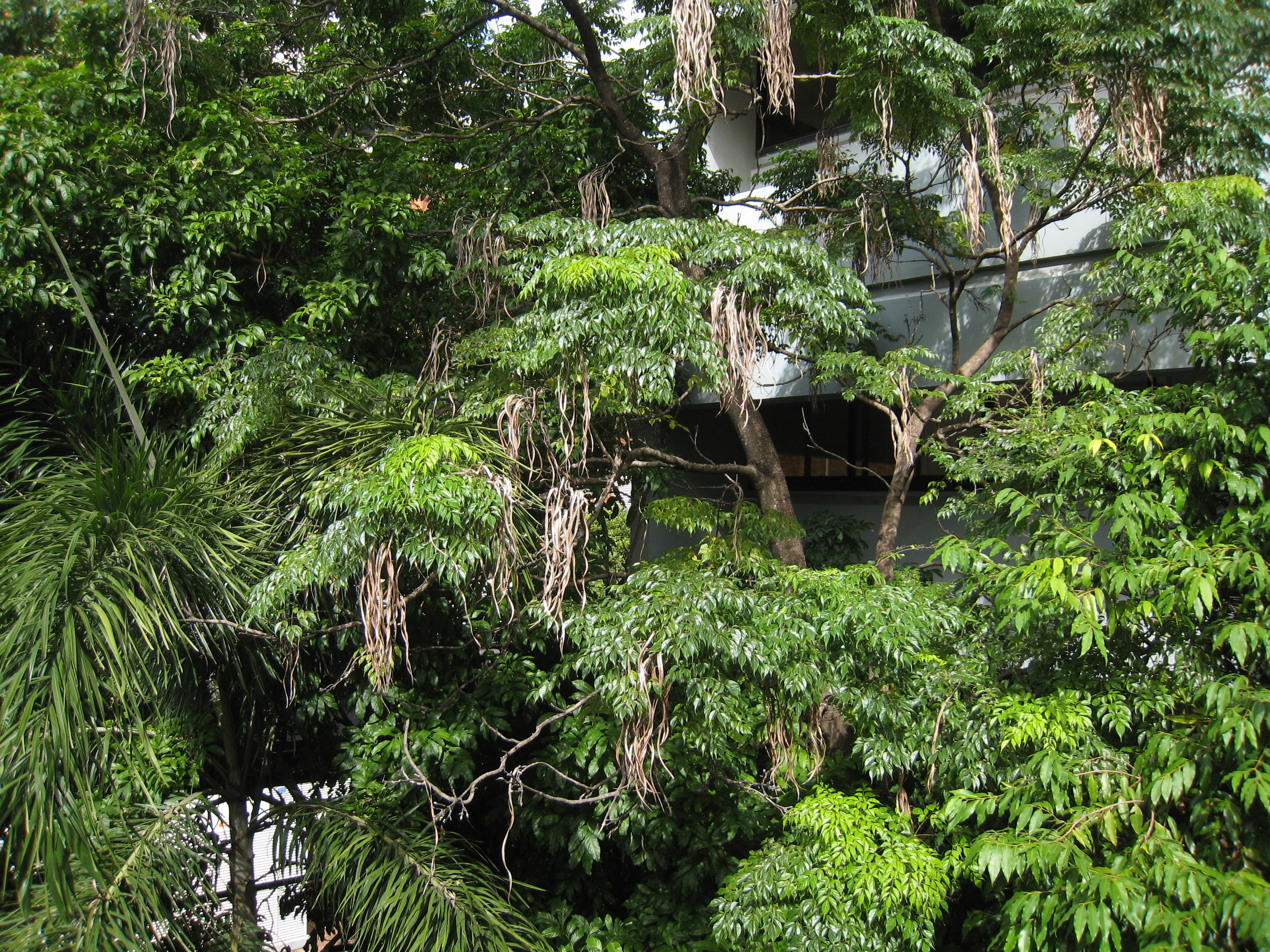
- Seed pods

Scientific classification
- Kingdom: Plantae
- Clade: Tracheophytes
- Clade: Angiosperms
- Clade: Eudicots
- Clade: Asterids
- Order: Lamiales
- Family: Bignoniaceae
- Genus: Radermachera
- Species: R. sinica

Binomial name
- Radermachera sinica (Hance) Hemsl.

Synonyms
- Radermachera borii C.E.C Fisch.; Radermachera tonkinensis Dop; Stereospermum sinicum Hance

= Radermachera sinica =

Species of tree

Radermachera sinica, also called the china doll, serpent tree or emerald tree, is an evergreen tree in the family Bignoniaceae, native to the subtropical mountain regions of southern China and Taiwan.

In recent years, this plant has become popular as a houseplant for its attractive and glossy, feathery leaves. The specific name sinica means "from China".

== Description ==
R. sinica can reach heights of up to 30 m tall and a trunk diameter of 1 m. The leaves are bipinnate, 20 to 70 cm long and 15 to 25 cm broad, divided into numerous small glossy green leaflets 2 to 4 cm long. The flowers are white, trumpet-like, about 7 cm long, and resemble a large Bignonia or Catalpa flower in shape. They are night-blooming and only last for one night, wilting in the morning sun. The blooms appear spring to early summer, and are highly fragrant. The brown seedpods are long and warped, leading to the common name "serpent tree". When mature, they burst open to release several winged, papery seeds that are dispersed by the wind.

== Cultivation ==
Radermachera sinica is often sold as a small houseplant, grown for its attractive glossy leaves; it does not normally flower indoors. It requires plenty of light and moisture in order to thrive. As with most houseplants, wilted leaves indicate either lack of water or overwatering. Recent dwarf variations have been released, often referred to as the Asian Bell Tree. The foliage is highly attractive and is glossy, dark green, and lacy. it consistently grows to a maximum of 3 meters and so makes a very popular indoor or patio plant, requiring a position with indirect sunlight. It can be grown outdoors in tropical to subtropical regions, and also areas with a Mediterranean climate. It should be planted in rich, well-drained soil in full sun to part shade and protect from drying winds and frost, which it cannot tolerate.

== See also ==
- List of Radermachera sinica diseases
