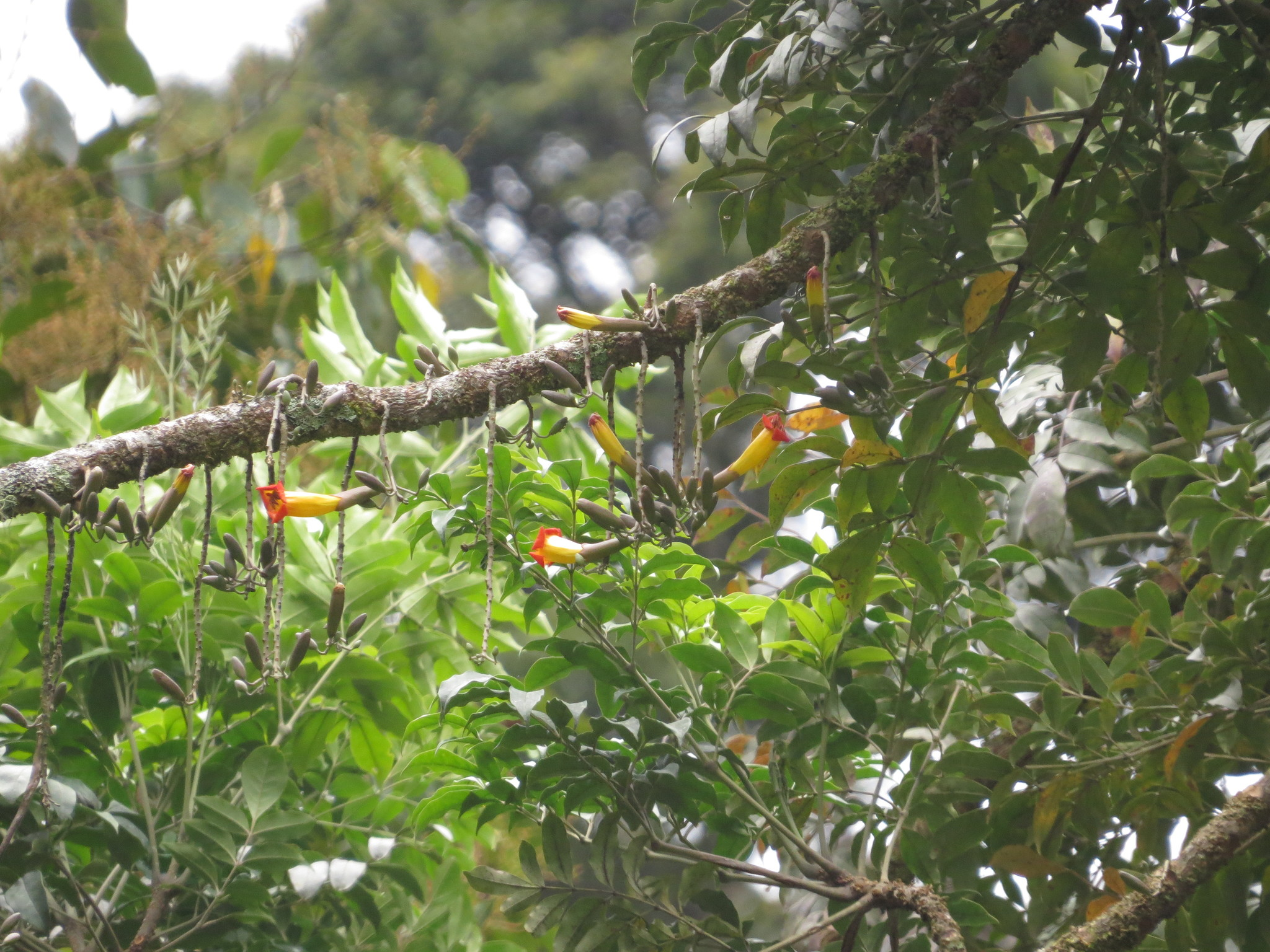
- In Sabah, Malaysia

Conservation status
- Vulnerable (IUCN 3.1)

Scientific classification
- Kingdom: Plantae
- Clade: Tracheophytes
- Clade: Angiosperms
- Clade: Eudicots
- Clade: Asterids
- Order: Lamiales
- Family: Bignoniaceae
- Genus: Radermachera
- Species: R. ramiflora

Binomial name
- Radermachera ramiflora Steenis

= Radermachera ramiflora =

Species of tree

Radermachera ramiflora is a tree in the family Bignoniaceae. The specific epithet ramiflora means 'flowering on the branches'.

== Description ==
Radermachera ramiflora grows up to 30 m (100 ft) tall, with a trunk diameter of up to 30 cm (12 in). The bark is greyish. The flowers are yellow. The fruits are straight or twisted and measure up to 70 cm (28 in) long.

== Distribution and habitat ==
Radermachera ramiflora is endemic to Malaysian Borneo where it is confined to Sabah state. Its habitat is in rainforest and on hillsides, typically on ultramafic soils, from sea-level to 1,500 metres (5,000 ft) elevation.
