= Wonoboyo hoard =

Mataram archaeological find

Wonoboyo Hoard
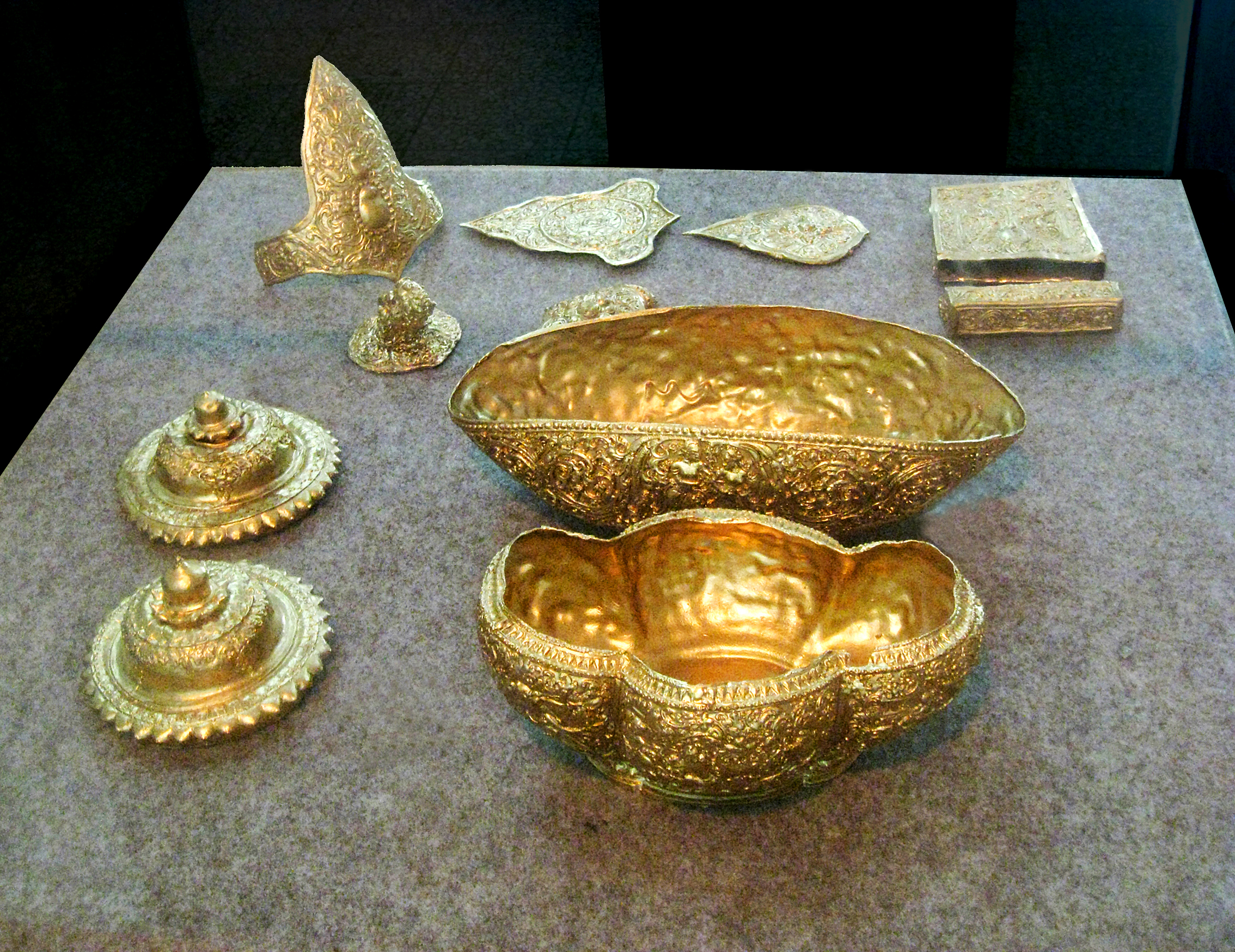
- The replica of Wonoboyo hoard golden artifacts, displayed at Prambanan Museum. The real Wonoboyo hoard is in display at National Museum of Indonesia, Jakarta
- Material: Gold and Silver
- Created: circa 9th century
- Discovered: Plosokuning hamlet, Wonoboyo village, Klaten, Central Java, near Prambanan (1990)
- Present location: National Museum of Indonesia, Jakarta

Wonoboyo hoard is an important archaeological find of golden and silver artifacts from the 9th century Mataram kingdom in Central Java, Indonesia. It was discovered in October 1990 in Plosokuning hamlet, Wonoboyo village, Klaten, Central Java, near Prambanan.

== Discovery ==
The hoard was discovered on 17 October 1990 in Plosokuning hamlet, Wonoboyo village, Klaten, Central Java, when a paddy field owned by Mrs. Cipto Suwarno was being dug by Witomoharjo and five other workers as part of an irrigation project. After digging down 2.5 metres, Witomoharjo hit a hard surface that he thought was a stone. However, after digging further they unearthed three large terracotta jars containing large numbers of coins and amounts of gold artifacts. The discovery was reported to village authorities and reached the attention of the Culture and Education Authority.

== The treasure ==
The total weight of the treasure was 16.9 kilograms of valuable artifacts, of which 14.9 kilograms were gold and 2 kilograms were silver. It consists of more than 1,000 ceremonial objects, including:

- a bulbous golden bowl carved with a Ramayana scene
- a Ramayana-carved golden wide-sided bowl. ("Bokor emas berhias relief cerita Ramayana" in Indonesian) This artifact has been identified as one of the cultural properties of Indonesia in 2013.
- 6 golden lids
- 3 golden water dippers
- 1 tray
- 97 golden arm bracelets
- 22 small bowls
- a pipe
- a large Tang dynasty terracotta jar as the container
- 2 smaller jars
- 11 golden rings
- 7 plates
- 8 golden earrings
- a golden handbag
- a golden keris handle or probably a parasol golden tip ornament
- some beads
- some corn seed-like golden coins

In addition to the above artifacts, there were more than 6,000 gold and silver coins.

The Wonoboyo hoard is displayed in the Treasure Room at the National Museum of Indonesia, Jakarta, and a replica of the treasure is on display at the Prambanan Museum. The hoard has also been exhibited in Australia.

The Wonoboyo hoard is one of the most important archaeological findings in Indonesia. Next to the high value of the gold and silver artifacts, it is also significant to reveal the wealth, economy, art, and culture of the 9th-century Javanese Mataram kingdom. The artifacts show the intricate artworks and also display the aesthetic and technical mastery of ancient Java goldsmiths. On the surface of the gold coins engraved with the script "ta", a short form of "tail" or "tahil" a unit of currency in ancient Java. Also revealed the script "Saragi Diah Bunga" engraved in one of the treasures written in the Kawi language, which probably was the name of the owner. The hoard was estimated dated from the reign of King Balitung (899–911). The treasure has been identified as belonging to a noble or a member of the royal family.
