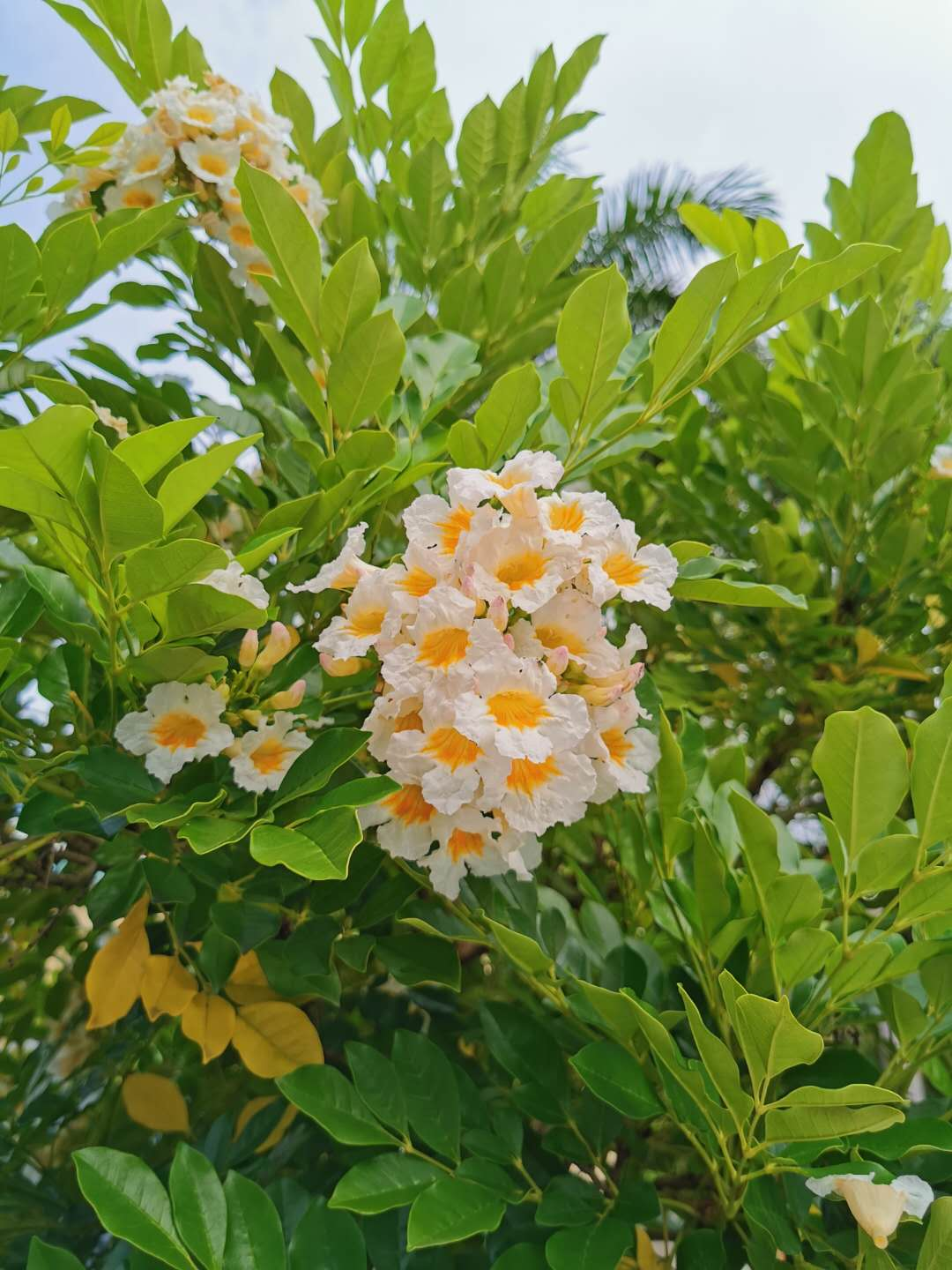
- Radermachera peninsularis

Scientific classification
- Kingdom: Plantae
- Clade: Tracheophytes
- Clade: Angiosperms
- Clade: Eudicots
- Clade: Asterids
- Order: Lamiales
- Family: Bignoniaceae
- Clade: Crescentiina
- Clade: Paleotropical clade
- Genus: Radermachera; Zoll. & Moritzi

Species
- See text

Synonyms
- Lagaropyxis Miq.

= Radermachera =

Genus of flowering plants

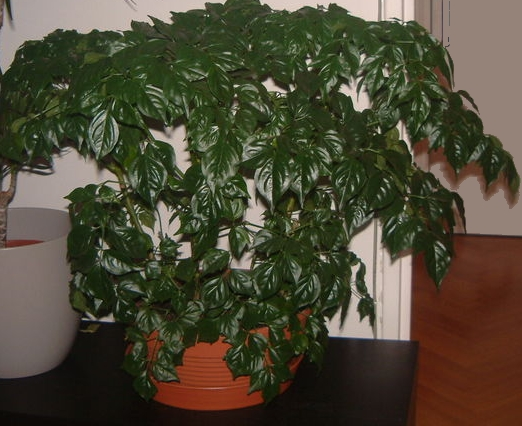
Radermachera sinica as a houseplant

Radermachera is a genus of about 17 species of flowering plants in the family Bignoniaceae, native to southeastern Asia. They are evergreen trees reaching 5–40 m tall, with bipinnate to tripinnate leaves, and panicles of large bell-shaped, white, pink, pale purple or yellow flowers 5–7 cm diameter.

The genus is named after Jacob Cornelis Matthieu Radermacher, the 18th century Dutch naturalist who cataloged much of the flora of Java and Sumatra.

== Species ==
As of July 2020, Plants of the World Online recognises 17 accepted species:

- Radermachera boniana Dop
- Radermachera coriacea Merr.
- Radermachera eberhardtii Dop
- Radermachera frondosa Chun & F.C.How
- Radermachera gigantea (Blume) Miq.
- Radermachera glandulosa (Blume) Miq.
- Radermachera hainanensis Merr.
- Radermachera inflata Steenis
- Radermachera microcalyx C.Y.Wu & W.C.Yin
- Radermachera peninsularis Steenis
- Radermachera pentandra Hemsl.
- Radermachera quadripinnata (Blanco) Seem.
- Radermachera ramiflora Steenis
- Radermachera sinica (Hance) Hemsl.
- Radermachera stellata Steenis
- Radermachera xylocarpa (Roxb.) Roxb. ex K.Schum.
- Radermachera yunnanensis C.Y.Wu & W.C.Yin

== Cultivation and uses ==
Radermachera sinica has become a popular houseplant, grown for its decorative foliage.

Radermachera sp. 'Kunming' sold under the tradename 'Summerscent' is a fast growing, scented, trending plant in Australia. Useful as an informal screen (pruning aggressively after flowering) or a small tree if trained to a single trunk (cinture before flowering to maximise flower production and reduce crown after flowering).
