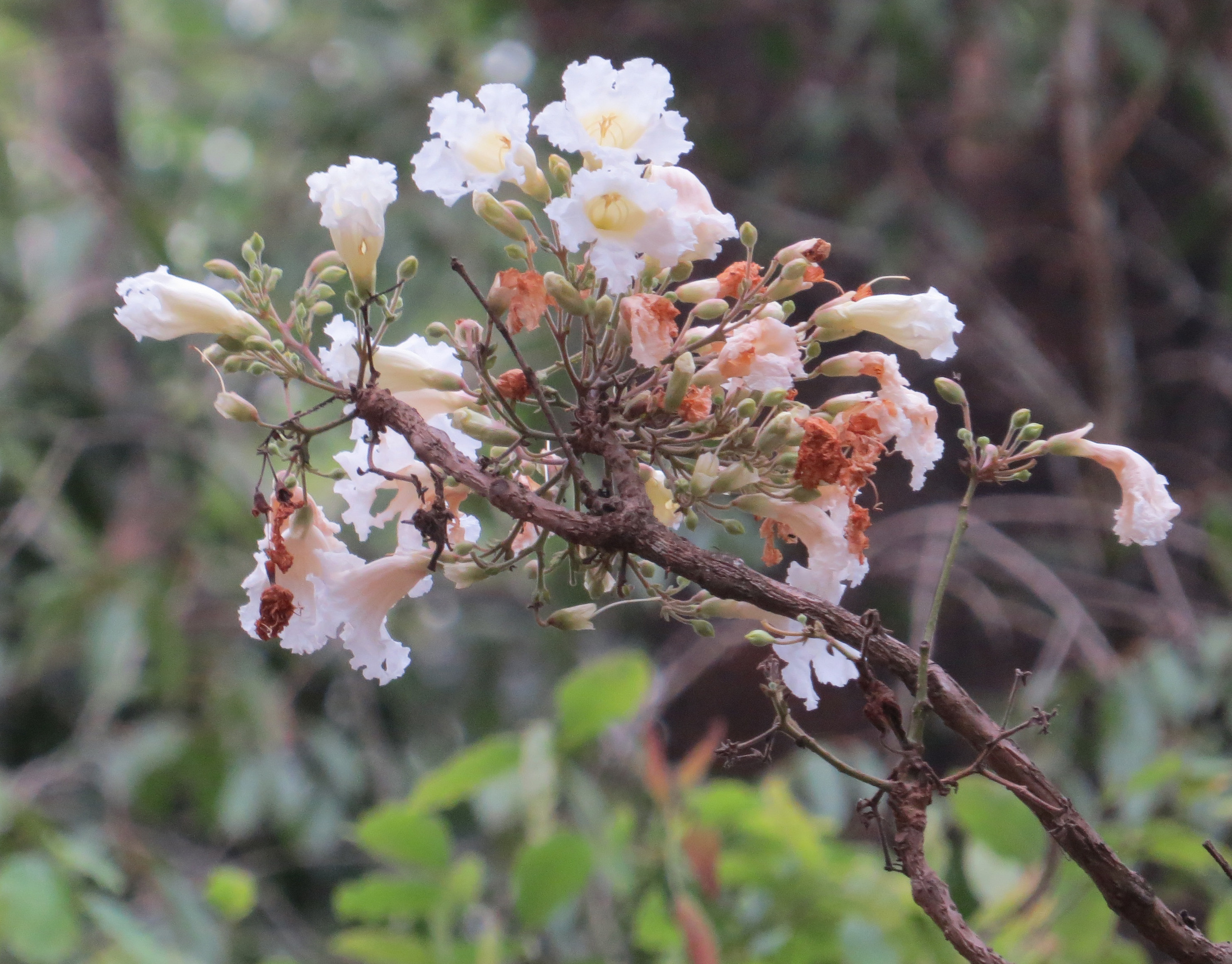

Scientific classification
- Kingdom: Plantae
- Clade: Tracheophytes
- Clade: Angiosperms
- Clade: Eudicots
- Clade: Asterids
- Order: Lamiales
- Family: Bignoniaceae
- Genus: Radermachera
- Species: R. xylocarpa

Binomial name
- Radermachera xylocarpa (Roxb.) K.Schum.

Synonyms
- Bignonia xylocarpa Roxb.; Spathodea xylocarpa (Roxb.) T.Anderson ex Brand.; Stereospermum xylocarpum (Roxb.) Benth. & Hook.f.; Tecoma xylocarpa (Roxb.) G.Don

= Radermachera xylocarpa =

Species of flowering plant

Radermachera xylocarpa is a species of plant in the family Bignoniaceae. It is endemic to India. Radermachera xylocarpa is reported to contain steroidal compounds like stegmasterol, sitosterol, cholesterol etc. with higher concentrations in different part of the plant.
