= Harmony Society, Batavia =

Social club in Batavia, Dutch East Indies

Coordinates: 6°10′05″S 106°49′16″E

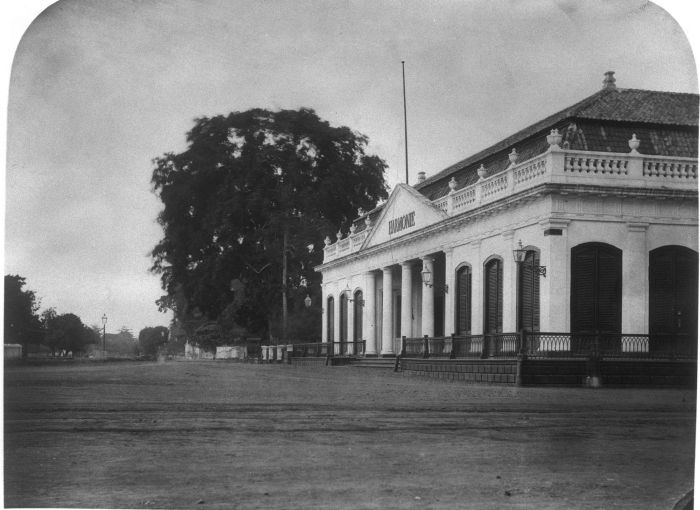
Harmony Society, Batavia (photographer: Isidore van Kinsbergen).

The Harmony Society (Dutch: Societeit de Harmonie) was an elite social club in Batavia, Dutch East Indies. It was the oldest clubhouse in Asia when it was demolished. The construction of the group's building included the former bricks of the wall of Old Batavia. It was demolished for road widening and parking area in 1985. Activities at the club included cards and billiards. Indigenous people were excluded from the club.

J.C. Schultze was the building's architect and also designed the Jakarta Art Building (Batavia Schouwburg).

The society building was constructed to convince Europeans to move from the old city centre (now Kota, Jakarta) to the more southerly area of Weltevreden. The style of the building is Neoclassical. The area around it has been referred to as ‘Harmoni’ and its destruction prompted increased awareness of Indonesia's colonial heritage.

The club in Central Jakarta was located at the intersection of Jalan Veteran and Jalan Majapahit (called Rijswijk and Rijswijkstraat respectively during the Dutch colonial era).

The first societeit club built in Batavia was at Buiten Nieuwpoorstraat (now Jalan Pintu Besar Selatan) in West Jakarta. In 1810, Governor General Herman Willem Daendels dispatched Major Schultze, designer of Daendels Palace at Waterlooplein, to design the large clubhouse. He wanted it to compete and undermine the influence of the Freemasons and it was part of his plan to move the administrative center of Batavia to the southern district of Weltevreden. The building was budgeted to cost 105,000 rijksdaalders and Batavia in the Nineteenth Century Photographs. After the British attacked Batavia in Aug 1811, construction was overseen by the new British Lieutenant-Governor of Java Thomas Stamford Raffles with a construction cost of 360,000 rijksdaalders. Abdul Hamied was the building's contractor. Construction was completed in late 1814 and the Harmonie club opened on January 18, 1815, to coincide with the official birthday of Queen Charlotte, wife of the then British King George III. Raffles included collections from the museum and library of the Batavian Society of Arts and Science in the building's annex. G. Windsor Earl visited. A Dutch cultural fair (Kermis) was held at the club and the Harmonie hosted a party for the 250th anniversary of the city of Batavia May 29, 1869. The clubhouse's site is now a park and parking lot of the State Secretariat office.

== Gallery ==
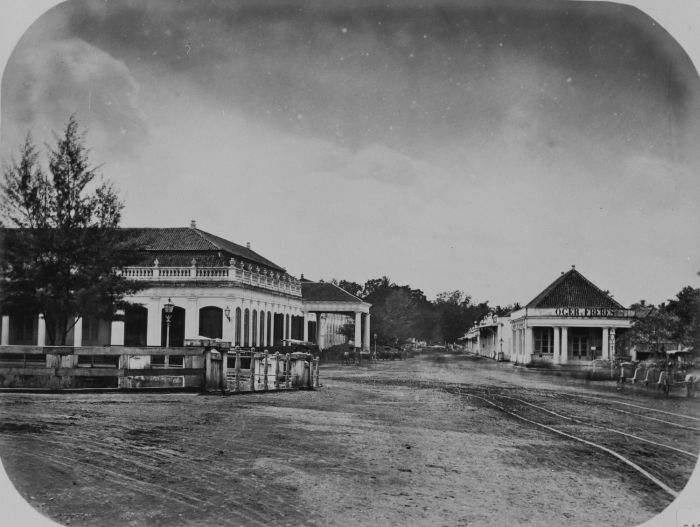
The Harmony Society and Oger Frères restaurant

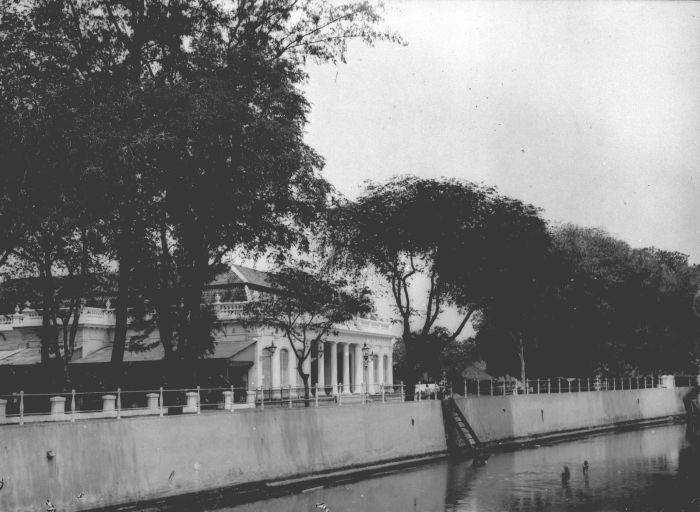
Children swimming by the club

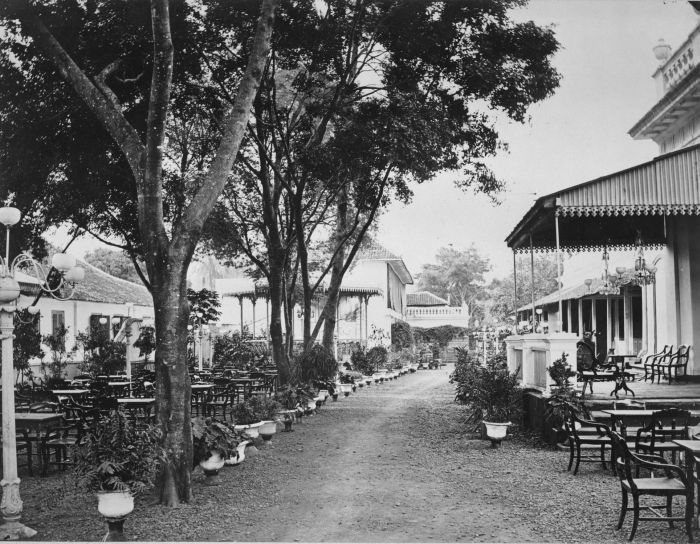
Garden area

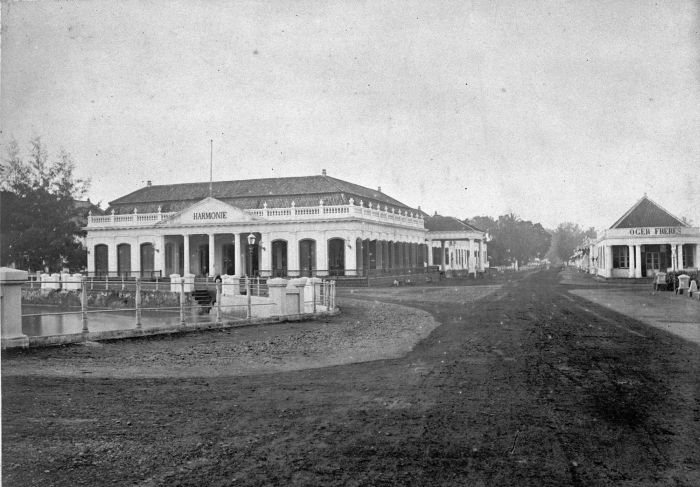
Harmonie Club in Batavia

== See also ==
- List of colonial buildings and structures in Jakarta
