= Majapahit =

Javanese empire from 1292 to 1527

Majapahit ꦩꦗꦥꦲꦶꦠ꧀ (Javanese)
- 1293–1527
- Reconstructed flag Surya Majapahit (Note: Surya Majapahit (the Sun of Majapahit) is the emblem commonly found in Majapahit ruins. It served as the symbol of the Majapahit empire.)

- The extent of Majapahit influence at its greatest extent, according to the 1365 narrative eulogy poem Nagarakretagama

- Territorial evolution of the Majapahit empire through various conquests and campaigns to its ultimate demise in the 16th century
- Capital: Majapahit (Trowulan)
- Common languages: Old Javanese
- Religion: Hinduism (Shaivism) and Buddhism; (official); Asceticism (karesyan); Islam (Note: Later period only); Animism
- Government: Maṇḍala state ruled by a Maharaja and governance by a Mahapatih (Prime Minister)
- Maharaja
  - 1293–1309: Kertarajasa Jayawardhana (Raden Wijaya) (first)
  - 1309–1328: Jayanegara
  - 1328–1350s: Tribhuwana Wijayatunggadewi (Dyah Gitarja)
  - 1350s–1389/1399: Hayam Wuruk
  - 1389/1399–1429: Vikramavardhana
  - c. 1486–1527 (Note: Although officially recognized as Maharaja, Girindrawardhana did not have a major role in his government. Most of the governmental duties were carried out by Patih Udara, who mainly led the remnants of Majapahit in Daha before the collapse of the empire.): Girindrawardhana (last)
- Mahapatih
  - 1294–1316: Nambi (first)
  - 1316–1323: Arya Tadah
  - 1334–1364: Gajah Mada
  - 1376–1394: Gajah Enggon
  - 1430–1498: Wahan
  - 1498–1516: Patih Udara (last)
- History
  - Establishment of Majapahit after the Mongol invasion: 1293
  - Coronation of King Kertarajasa Jayawardhana: 10 November 1293
  - Palapa oath: 1334 or 1336
  - Battle of Bubat: 1357
  - Regreg War (Majapahit civil war): 1404–1406
  - Demak–Majapahit conflicts: 1478–1527
  - Disestablished: 1527
- Currency: Kepeng; Native gold and silver coins
Preceded by
Singhasari
Succeeded by
Demak Sultanate
Blambangan Kingdom
Malacca Sultanate
Sultanate of Gowa
Pagaruyung Kingdom
Bruneian Sultanate (1368–1888)
- Today part of: Indonesia; Singapore; Malaysia; Brunei; Thailand; Timor-Leste; Philippines

Majapahit (Javanese: ꦩꦗꦥꦲꦶꦠ꧀, romanized: Måjåpahit; Javanese pronunciation: [mɔd͡ʒɔpaɪt] (eastern and central dialect) or [mad͡ʒapaɪt] (western dialect)), also known as Wilwatikta (Note: Some Javanese court literature use this Sanskrit-derived name, which bears the same meaning ("bitter gourd") as "Majapahit" does in Old Javanese, for example in the Deśavarṇana (canto 1 stanza 2) and Kidung Harsawijaya (canto 4 stanza 66). It is sometimes also written backwards as Tiktawilwa, for example in the Deśavarṇana (canto 18 stanza 4). However it is still more widely known by its Old Javanese name, as recorded in Javanese and Balinese manuscripts, as well as in the hikayats of Aceh, Banjar, Malay, Palembang, etc.) (Javanese: ꦮꦶꦭ꧀ꦮꦠꦶꦏ꧀ꦠ; Javanese pronunciation: [wɪlwatɪkta], Sanskrit: विल्वतिक्त, romanized: vilvatikta), was a Javanese Hindu-Buddhist thalassocratic empire in Southeast Asia based on the island of Java (in modern-day Indonesia). At its greatest extent, following significant military expansions, the territory of the empire and its tributary states covered almost the entire Nusantara archipelago, spanning both Asia and Oceania. After a civil war that weakened control over the vassal states, the empire slowly declined before collapsing in 1527 due to an invasion by the Sultanate of Demak. The fall of Majapahit saw the rise of Islamic kingdoms in Java.

Established by Raden Wijaya in 1292, Majapahit rose to power after the Mongol invasion of Java and reached its peak during the era of the queen Tribhuvana and her son Hayam Wuruk, whose reigns in the mid-14th century were marked by conquests that extended throughout Southeast Asia. This achievement is also credited to the famous prime minister Patih Gajah Mada. According to the Nagarakṛtāgama written in 1365, Majapahit was an empire of 98 tributaries, stretching from Sumatra to New Guinea; including territories in present-day Indonesia, Singapore, Malaysia, Brunei, southern Thailand, Timor Leste, and southwestern Philippines (in particular the Sulu Archipelago), although the scope of Majapahit sphere of influence is still the subject of debate among historians. The nature of Majapahit's relations and influence upon its overseas vassals and also its status as an empire still provokes discussion.

Majapahit was one of the last major Hindu-Buddhist empires of the region and is considered to be one of the greatest and most powerful empires in the history of Indonesia and Southeast Asia. It is sometimes seen as the precedent for Indonesia's modern boundaries. Its influence extended beyond the modern territory of Indonesia and has been the subject of many studies.

== Etymology ==
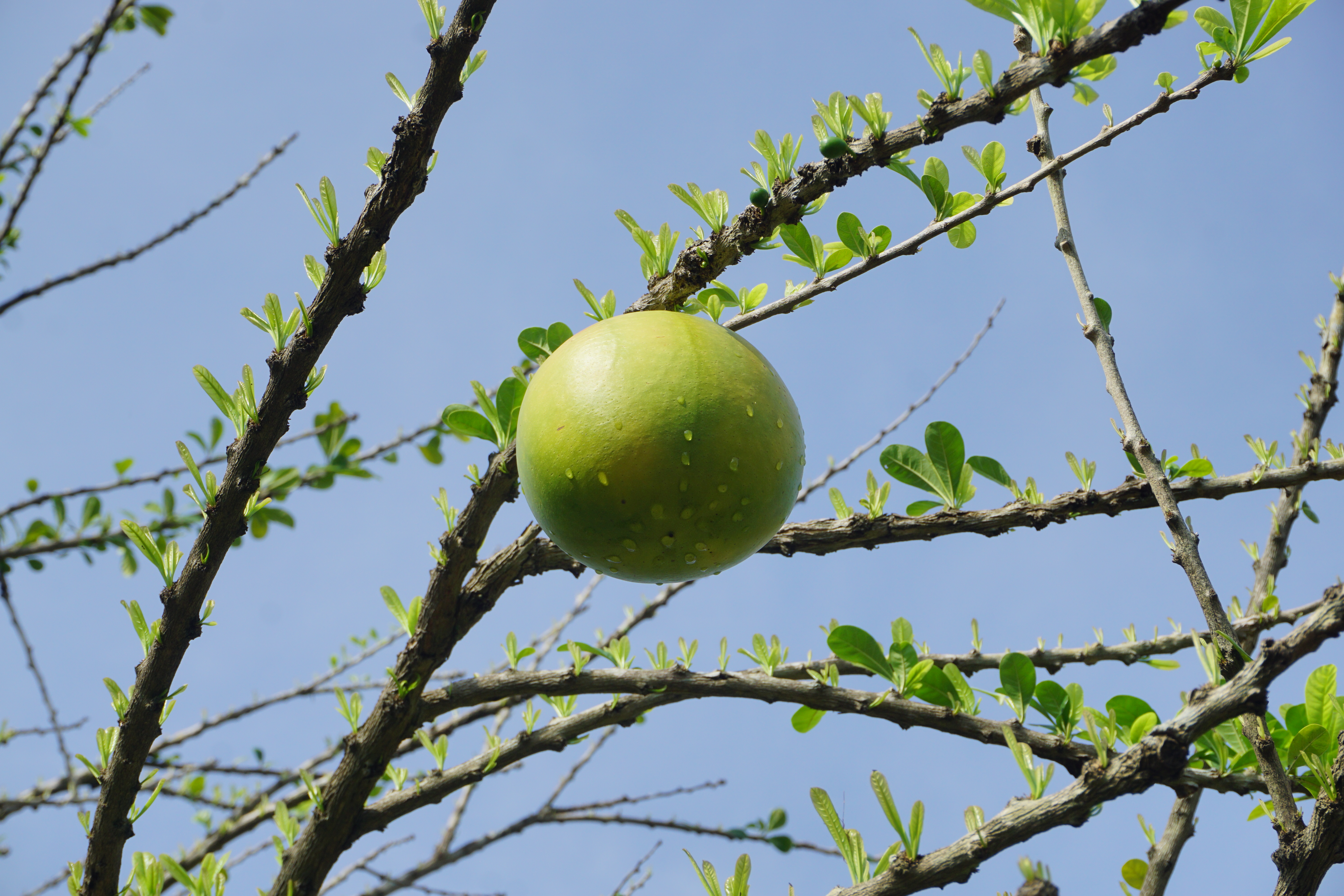
A maja fruit growing near Trowulan. The bitter-tasting fruit is the origin of the kingdom's name.

The name Majapahit (sometimes also spelled Mojopait to reflect Javanese pronunciation), derives from Javanese, meaning "bitter maja". German orientalist Berthold Laufer suggested that the maja element comes from the Javanese name of Aegle marmelos, an Indonesian tree. Majapahit is also referred to by the Sanskrit-derived synonym Wilwatikta (Sanskrit: विल्वतिक्त, romanized: vilvatikta, lit. 'bitter maja'). Toponyms containing the word maja are common in the area in and around Trowulan (e.g. Mojokerto), as it is a widespread practice in Java to name an area, a village or settlement with the most conspicuous or abundant tree or fruit species found in that region. The 16th-century chronicle Pararaton records a legend linked to the establishment of a new settlement in the forest of Trik by Raden Wijaya in 1292. It was said that the workers clearing the Trik forest encountered some maja trees and consumed their bitter-tasting fruit which then gave its name to the village.

Strictly speaking, the name Majapahit refers to the kingdom's capital, but today it is common to refer to the kingdom by its capital's name. In Javanese primary sources, the kingdom as an extended territory is generally referred to not as Majapahit but rather as bhūmi Jawa ("land of Java") in Old Javanese or yava-dvīpa-maṇḍala ("country of the island of Java") in Sanskrit.

== Historiography ==
=== Archaeological evidence ===
Compared to contemporary societies elsewhere in Asia, little physical evidence of Majapahit remains. However, Majapahit did produce physical evidence: the main ruins dating from the Majapahit period are clustered in the Trowulan area, which was the royal capital of the kingdom. The area has become the centre for the study of Majapahit history. The Trowulan archaeological site was first documented in the 19th century by Sir Thomas Stamford Raffles, Lieutenant-Governor of British Java of the East India Company from 1811 to 1816. He reported the existence of "ruins of temples... scattered about the country for many miles", and referred to Trowulan as "this pride of Java". Aerial and satellite imagery has revealed an extensive network of canals crisscrossing the Majapahit capital. Findings from April 2011 indicate the Majapahit capital was much larger than previously believed after some artefacts were uncovered.

=== Inscriptions ===
While significant details about the history of Majapahit remain vague, this period of Javanese history is the more comprehensively documented than any other. The most reliable written sources for this period are Old Javanese inscriptions on stone and metal, which are contemporary with the events they describe. These inscriptions provide valuable information about dynasties, religious affairs, village communities, society, economics, and the arts.

The Majapahit dynasty is described in royal inscriptions such as Kudadu (issued in 1294), Sukhamerta (1296), Tuhanyaru (1323), Gajah Mada (1351), Waringin Pitu (1447) and Trailokyapuri (1486). These sources help us to clarify the family relationships and chronologies of the Majapahit rulers, as well as to correct certain errors found in the Pararaton. A few inscriptions found outside Java, such as the Pura Abang C inscription discovered in northern Bali, offer conclusive evidence that these areas were under Majapahit control during the late 14th century.

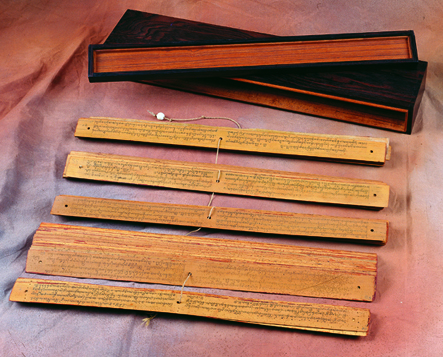
''Deśarvarṇana'' palm-leaf manuscript in the National Library of Indonesia collection.

=== Javanese chronicles ===
Two important chronicle sources are available to historians of Majapahit: Deśavarṇana ("Description of Districts") was composed in 1365 and the Pararaton ("The Monarchs") was compiled sometime between 1481 and 1600. Both of these chronicles survive as 19th- or 20th-century palm-leaf manuscripts. The Deśavarṇana (also known as Nagarakretagama) is an Old Javanese eulogy written during the Majapahit golden age under the reign of Hayam Wuruk, after which some events are covered narratively. Composed by Mpu Prapanca, it provides a primary historical account of Majapahit court during the reign of King Hayam Wuruk, as well as detailed information about the East Javanese countryside and a summary of Singhasari history. The Pararaton focuses on Ken Arok, the founder of Singhasari, but includes a number of shorter narrative fragments about the formation of Majapahit.

The Javanese sources incorporate some poetic mythological elements into their historical accounts. This complexity has led to a variety of interpretive approaches. Cornelis Christiaan Berg, a Dutch historian, have considered the entire historical record to be not a record of the past, but a supernatural means by which the future can be determined. (Note: cited in) Most scholars do not accept this view, as the historical record corresponds in part with Chinese materials that could not have had similar intention. The references to rulers and details of the state structure show no sign of being invented.

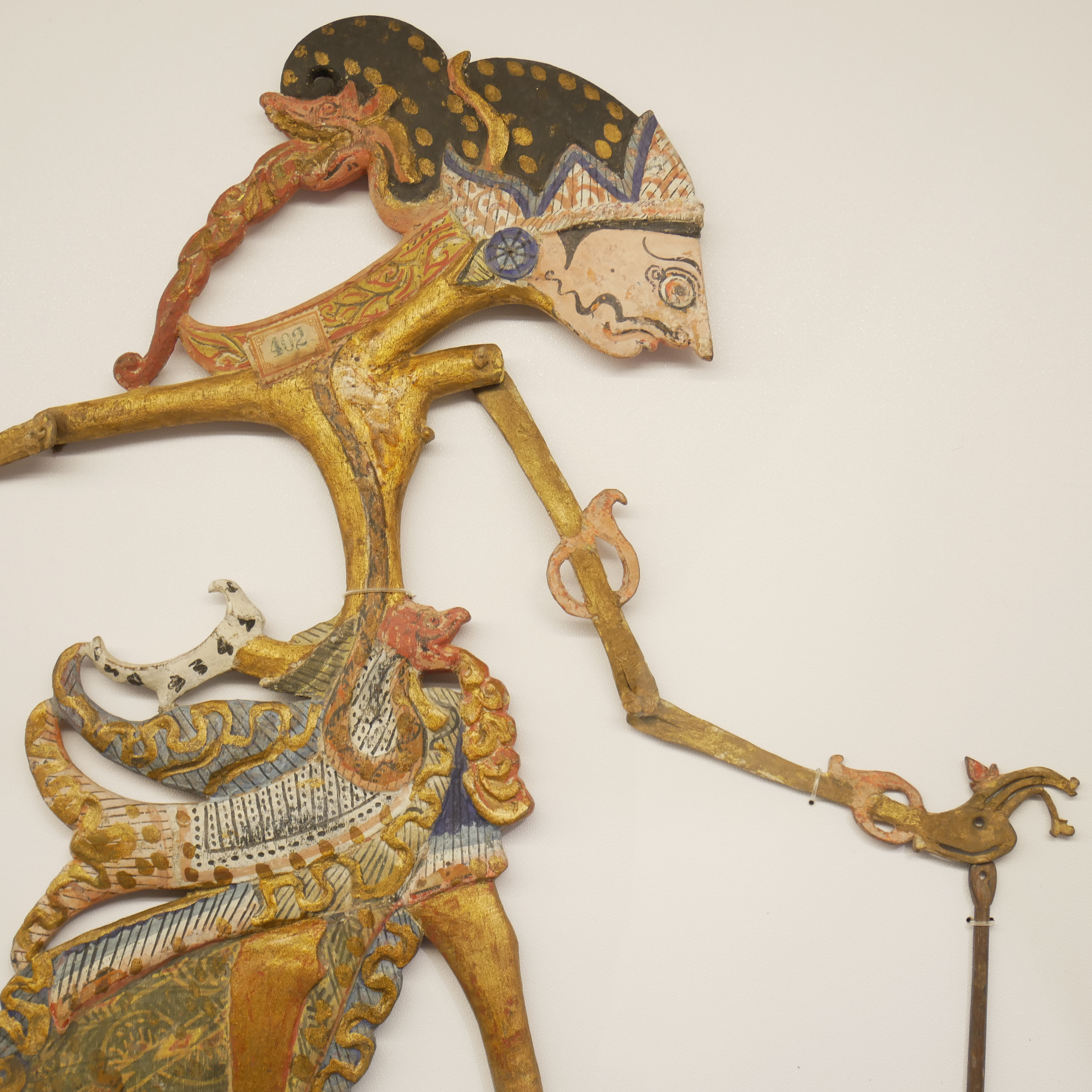
Wayang klithik puppet of Raden Damar Wulan – the hero of Majapahit kingdom

=== Chinese sources ===
Chinese historical sources on Majapahit mainly derive from the chronicles of the Yuan and following Ming dynasty. A key source of material is from Admiral Zheng He's reports during his visit to Majapahit between 1405–1432. Zheng He's translator, Ma Huan, wrote a detailed description of Majapahit and where the king of Java lived. The report was composed and collected in his 1451 Yingya Shenglan ("The Overall Survey of the Ocean's Shores"), which provides valuable insight on the culture, customs, and various social and economic aspects of Java (爪哇, Zhǎowā) during the Majapahit period. The Ming Veritable Records (Ming Shilu) provide supporting evidence for specific events in Majapahit history, such as the Regreg War.

== History ==
=== Formation ===
After the Pamalayu campaign to conquer the Melayu Kingdom in Sumatra from 1275–1292, the kingdom of Singhasari became the most powerful polity in the region. Shortly after, Singhasari was directly challenged by Emperor Kublai Khan, the Khagan of the Mongol Empire and emperor of the Mongol-led Yuan dynasty of China, who sent emissaries demanding tribute. The king of Singhasari, King Kertanagara, refused to pay the tribute and mutilated a Yuan minister's face before sending him back to China. Enraged, Emperor Kublai Khan sent a massive expedition of 30,000 soldiers and 1,000 ships to Java as a punitive expedition in 1293.

==== Mongol invasion ====
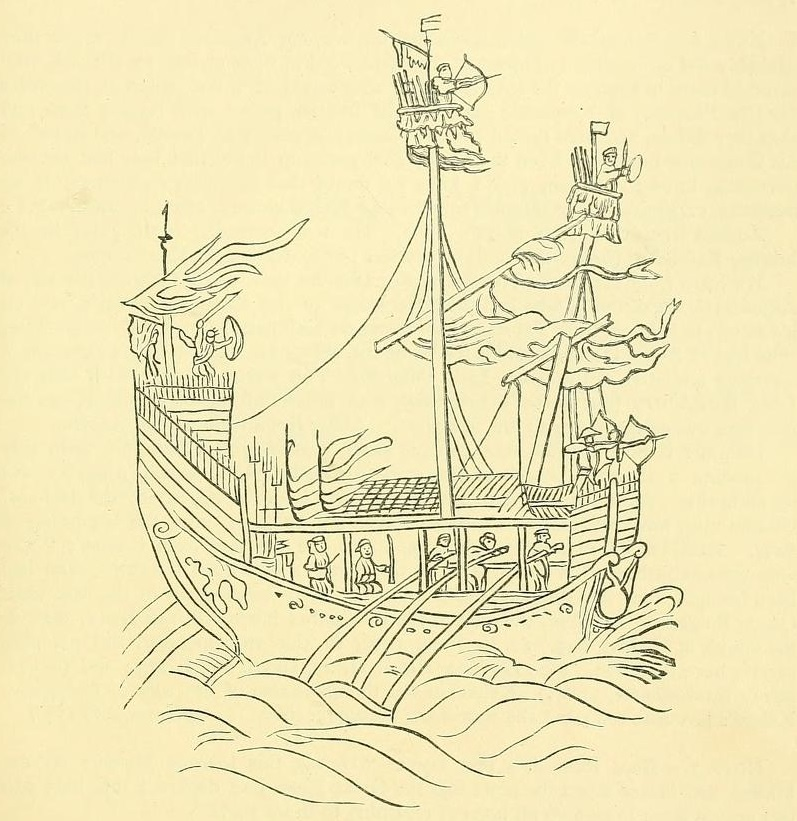
Painting of a 14th-century Yuan junk. Similar ships were sent by the Yuan in their naval armada.

By the time that the Yuan army returned to Java to exact their revenge, however, King Kertanagara was already dead; he had been killed by Jayakatwang, the Adipati (Duke) of the Kingdom of Kediri, a vassal state of Singhasari. Meanwhile, King Kertanegara's son-in-law, Raden Wijaya, had been pardoned by the usurper King Jayakatwang with the aid of Aria Wiraraja, the Regent of Madura, and was given timberland in Trowulan as consolation. Raden Wijaya built a new settlement there, naming the village Majapahit after a type of fruit (maja) growing there that had a bitter taste (pahit). Thus, when the Yuan army arrived, Raden Wijaya allied himself with them to fight against King Jayakatwang. Once King Jayakatwang had been defeated, Raden Wijaya launched a surprise attack and turned against his former Yuan allies. The Yuan army was forced to withdraw in confusion, as they were in hostile territory and their ships were constantly being attacked. It was also their last chance to catch the monsoon winds home; otherwise, they would have had to wait for another six months.

==== The first king, Kertarajasa Jayawardhana ====
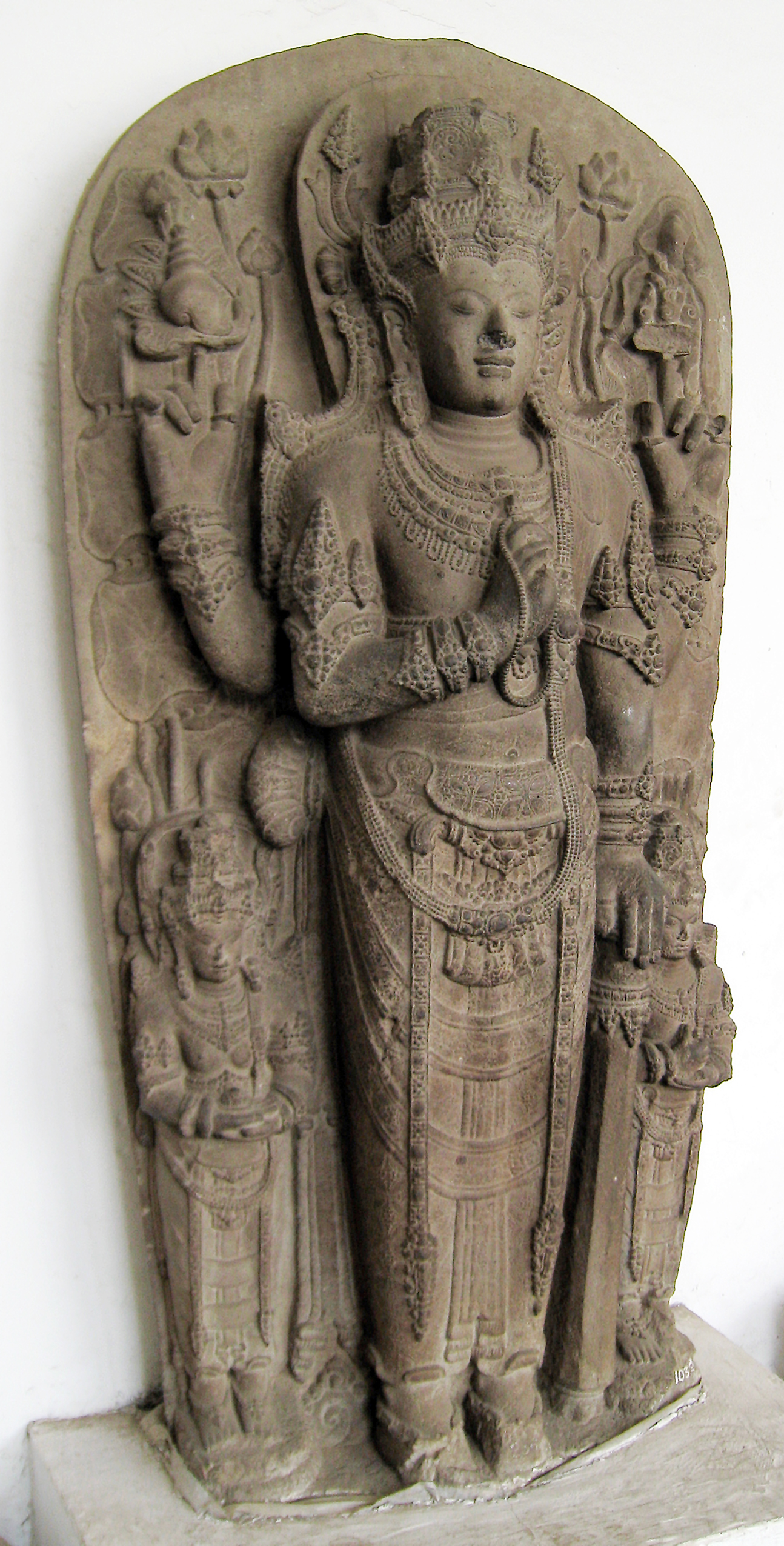
King Kertarajasa portrayed as Harihara, amalgamation of Shiva and Vishnu. Originally located at Candi Simping, Blitar, today it is displayed in National Museum.

In 1293, Raden Wijaya founded a stronghold with the capital Majapahit. The exact date used as the birth of the Majapahit kingdom is the day of his coronation, the 15th day of the month of Kārttika in the year 1215 of the Javanese Śaka era, which equates to 10 November 1293. During his coronation, he was given the regnal name Kertarajasa Jayawardhana. King Kertarajasa took the remaining three daughters of his dead father-in-law King Kertanegara as his wives, with his first wife Tribhuwaneswari being prime queen consort, and her three sisters as concubines: Prajnaparamita, Narendraduhita, and the youngest, Gayatri Rajapatni. According to the Pararaton (Book of Kings), he also wed a princess named Dara Petak from Dharmasraya, the capital of the Sumatran Melayu Kingdom.

The new Majapahit kingdom faced challenges. Some of Kertarajasa's most trusted men, including Ranggalawe, Sora, and Nambi, rebelled against him, though unsuccessfully. It was suspected that the Mahapati Halayudha had set a conspiracy to overthrow all of his rivals in the court by enticing them to revolt against the king, while he gained king's favor and thus attained the highest position in the government. However, following the death of the last rebel Kuti, Halayudha's treachery was exposed, and he was subsequently captured, jailed, and sentenced to death. Wijaya himself died in 1309.

==== Jayanegara ====
Kertarajasa Wijaya was succeeded by his heir Jayanegara. The reign of Jayanegara was a difficult and chaotic one, troubled with several rebellions by his father's former companions in arms. Among them were Gajah Biru's rebellion in 1314, Semi rebellion in 1318, and the Kuti rebellion in 1319. The Kuti rebellion was the most dangerous one, as Kuti managed to take control of the capital city. With the help of Gajah Mada and his Bhayangkara palace guard, Jayanegara barely escaped from the capital and safely hid in the village of Badander. While the king was in hiding, Gajah Mada returned to the capital city to assess the situation, and after learning that Kuti's rebellion was supported neither by the common people nor by the nobles of Majapahit court, he raised resistance forces to crush the Kuti rebellion.

After Kuti forces were defeated, Jayanegara safely returned to his throne. For his loyalty and excellent service, Gajah Mada was promoted to high office to begin his career in royal court politics.

According to tradition, King Jayanegara was notorious for his immorality. One of his distasteful acts was his desire to take his half-sisters, Gitarja and Rajadewi, as wives. Since Javanese tradition abhorred the practice of half-siblings marrying, the council of royal elders spoke strongly against the king's wishes. It was not clear what motivated Jayanegara's wish – it might have been his way to ensure his claim to the throne by preventing rivals from being his half-sisters' suitors, although in the later period of the Majapahit court the custom of marriage among cousins was quite common. In the Pararaton (Book of Kings), he was known as Kala Gemet, or "weak villain". Around the time of Jayanegara's reign in the early 14th century, the Italian friar Odoric of Pordenone visited the Majapahit court in Java, noting that it was well-populated and filled with cloves, nutmeg, and many other spices. He also mentioned that the king of Java had seven vassals under him and engaged in several wars with the "khan of Cathay".

In 1328, King Jayanegara was murdered by his physician, Tanca, during a surgical operation. In complete mayhem and rage, Gajah Mada immediately killed Tanca. The motive behind this regicide was never clear. According to the Pararaton, it was Tanca's revenge for the king sexually abusing his wife. However, according to the Balinese manuscript Babad Dalem, the assassination was a stratagem crafted by Gajah Mada himself to rid the kingdom of an evil tyrant. Tradition mentions that the immoral, cruel, and abusive king often seduced and abused women, even the wives of his own subordinates. Other possible reason includes to protect the two princesses—King Jayanegara's half-sisters, Dyah Gitarja and Rajadewi Maharajasa, the daughters of his stepmother Queen Gayatri Rajapatni—from Jayanegara's cruelty. Since the slain king was childless, he left no successor.

=== Golden age ===
==== Queen Tribhuwana Wijayatunggadewi ====
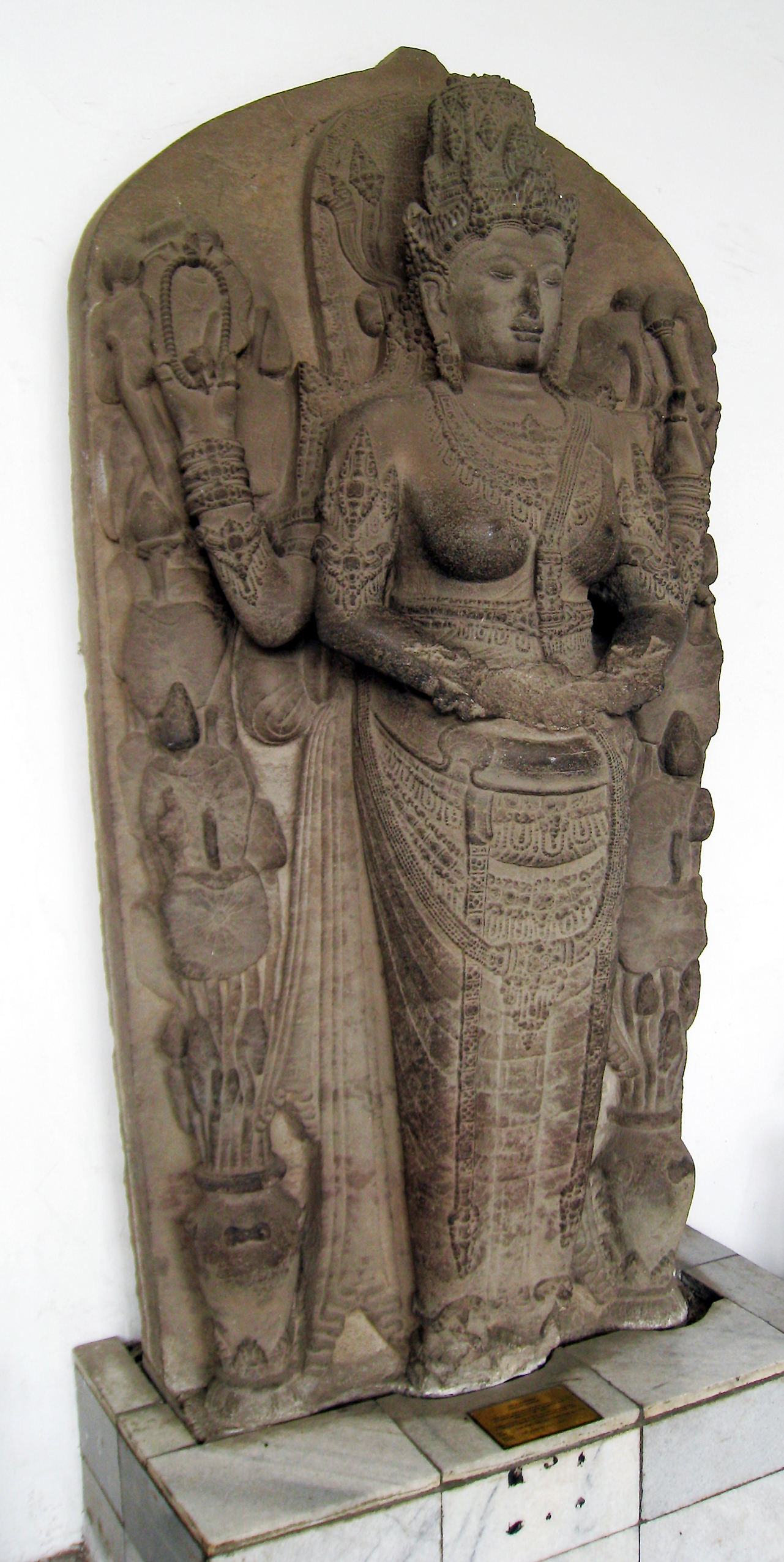
A mortuary deified portrayal of Tribhuwana Wijayatunggadewi (Dyah Gitarja), Queen of Majapahit, portrayed as the Mother Goddess Parvati

King Jayanegara's stepmother, Queen Consort of Majapahit Gayatri Rajapatni—the most revered matriarch of the court—was set to ascend the throne. However, Rajapatni had retired from worldly affairs to become a Buddhist nun, and instead appointed her daughter, Tribhuwana Wijayatunggadewi (Dyah Gitarja), to be queen under her auspices. Under her formal regnal name of Tribhuwannottunggadewi Jayawishnuwardhani, she appointed Gajah Mada as her mahapatih (prime minister) in 1336. During his inauguration as mahapatih, Gajah Mada made his famous Palapa oath, declaring that he would not enjoy a moment's rest until he unified the archipelago under Majapahit rule.

During Queen Tribhuwana's rule, Majapahit territory greatly expanded, and under the initiative of her able and ambitious prime minister, Gajah Mada, Majapahit sent its armada to conquer the neighbouring island of Bali. According to the Babad Arya Tabanan manuscript, in 1342, Majapahit forces led by Gajah Mada and assisted by General Arya Damar, the regent of Palembang, landed in the Bali Kingdom. After seven months of battles, Majapahit defeated the Balinese king and captured the Balinese capital of Bedulu in 1343. After the conquest of Bali, Majapahit distributed the governing authority of Bali among General Arya Damar's younger brothers: Arya Kenceng, Arya Kutawandira, Arya Sentong, and Arya Belog. Arya Kenceng led his brothers to govern Bali under Majapahit suzerainty, and he would become the progenitor of the Balinese kings of the Tabanan and Badung royal houses. Through this campaign, Majapahit planted a vassal dynasty that would rule the Bali Kingdom in the following centuries. Queen Tribhuwana ruled Majapahit until the death of her mother, Queen Consort Gayatri Rajapatni, in 1350, whereupon Tribhuwana abdicated the throne in favour of her son, Hayam Wuruk.

Maghrebi explorer Ibn Battuta visited the island during his travels between 1332 and 1347, noting that he stopped by a place called Mul Jawa (the "island of Java", as opposed to al-Jawa which referred to Sumatra). He noted that the empire took two months to travel, and ruled over a walled city called "Qaqula" and a place called "Qamara". Upon arriving at Qaqula, Ibn Battuta observed that the city had war junks for pirate raiding and collecting tolls, and that elephants were employed for various purposes. He met the ruler of Mul Jawa and stayed as a guest for three days. Ibn Battuta said that the women of Java rode horses, understood archery, and fought like men. He also recorded a story about a country called Tawalisi (also thought by some scholars to be Java), whose king opposed the Emperor of the Yuan dynasty in China, and waged war with the Chinese using numerous junks "until they come to terms with him on certain conditions".

==== Reign of Hayam Wuruk and Gajah Mada's conquest ====
Rough estimations of Majapahit's conquest of the Indonesian archipelago (Nusantara) in the 13th century, its decline, and its eventual fall in the early 16th century. The existing historical records from several sources (Note: Mainly Nagarakretagama, Pararaton, Suma Oriental, and Ming dynasty records) only partially describe the years listed, and are thus subject to revisions.

King Hayam Wuruk, also known as Rajasanagara, ruled Majapahit from 1350–1389. During this period, Majapahit attained its peak with the help of mahapatih (prime minister) Gajah Mada, who maintained his power from 1313–1364. Under Gajah Mada's command, Majapahit conquered more territories and became the regional power. According to the 1365 Nagarakretagama, Canto XIII and XIV mentions several states in Sumatra, the Malay Peninsula, Borneo, Sulawesi, the Nusa Tenggara islands, the Maluku Islands, New Guinea, Mindanao, the Sulu Archipelago, Luzon, and some parts of the Visayas islands as being under Majapahit rule. The Hikayat Raja Pasai, a 14th-century Acehenese chronicle, describes a Majapahit naval invasion on the Samudera Pasai Sultanate on the north coast of Sumatra in 1350. The attacking force consisted of four hundred large jong ships, and an uncountable number of malangbang barges and kelulus rowing boats. This expansion marked the greatest extent of Majapahit, making it one of the most influential empires in Indonesian history.

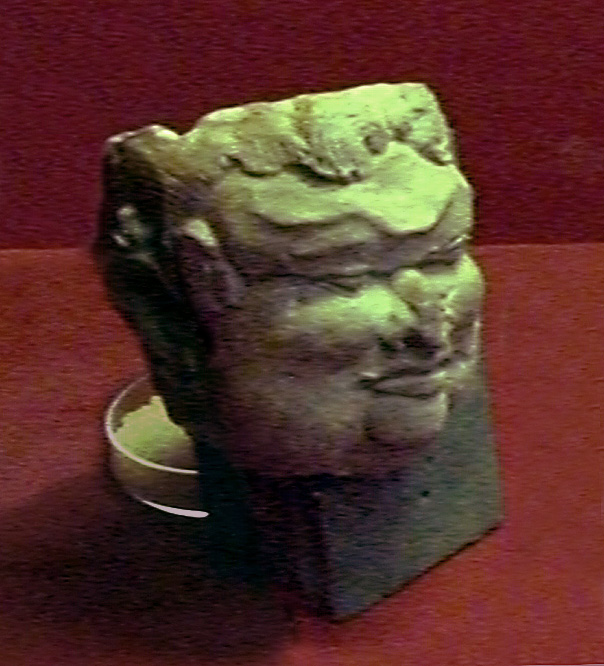
A terracotta figure popularly believed by Minister of Education and national hero Mohammad Yamin to be a portrait of Gajah Mada, collection of the Trowulan Museum. His claim, however, is not backed by historical sources.

In 1355, Hayam Wuruk launched the third invasion of the Dayak-Maʼanyan Kingdom of Nan Sarunai in southern Borneo, at the time led by Raden Anyan (Datu Tatuyan Wulau Miharaja Papangkat Amas). According to the Hikayat Banjar, a history of the kings of southern Borneo, this invasion was led by Ampu Jatmika from Kalingga in Kediri, along with his advisor Aria Megatsari, his general Tumenggung Tatah Jiwa, his minister Wiramartas, Patih Baras, Patih Basi, Patih Luhu, Patih Dulu, and his bodyguards Sang Panimba Segara, Sang Pembelah Batung, Sang Jampang Sasak, and Sang Pengeruntung 'Garuntung' Manau. Multiple battles took place, with the first battle in April 1358; killed Majapahit soldiers were burned in Tambak Wasi. Nansarunai captain Jamuhala was also killed in this battle. While prince Jarang and prince Idong hid in Man near Tabalong-kiwa river. Nansarunai soldiers were concentrated in Pulau Kadap before the second battle happened in December 1362. Casualties from this second battle were buried in Tambak in Bayu Hinrang. In this war Raden Anyan was killed, speared by Mpu Nala, and buried in Banua Lawas. In its place, Ampu Jatmika founded a Hindu kingdom state, Negara Dipa under Majapahit tributary, predecessor of Banjar. While surviving Javanese, Dayak, Madurese, and Bugis soldiers, sailors, metalsmiths of this war settled in Amuntai, Alabio, and Nagara. These invasions were recorded in Dayak Ma'anyan poetry as Nansarunai Usak Jawa.

Along with launching naval and military expeditions, the expansion of the Majapahit Empire involved diplomacy and alliance. Hayam Wuruk decided, probably for political reasons, to take princess Citra Rashmi (Dyah Pitaloka) of neighbouring Sunda Kingdom as his consort. The Sundanese took this proposal as an alliance agreement. In 1357 the Sunda king and his royal family came to Majapahit to accompany and marry his daughter to Hayam Wuruk. However, Gajah Mada saw this event as an opportunity to demand Sunda's submission to Majapahit overlordship. The skirmish between the Sunda royal family and the Majapahit troops on Bubat square was inevitable. Despite courageous resistance, the royal family were overwhelmed and decimated. Almost the whole of the Sundanese royal party was killed. Tradition mentioned that the heartbroken princess committed suicide to defend the honour of her country. The Battle of Bubat, or the Pasunda Bubat tragedy, became the main theme of Kidung Sunda, also mentioned in Carita Parahyangan and Pararaton, but it was never mentioned in Nagarakretagama.

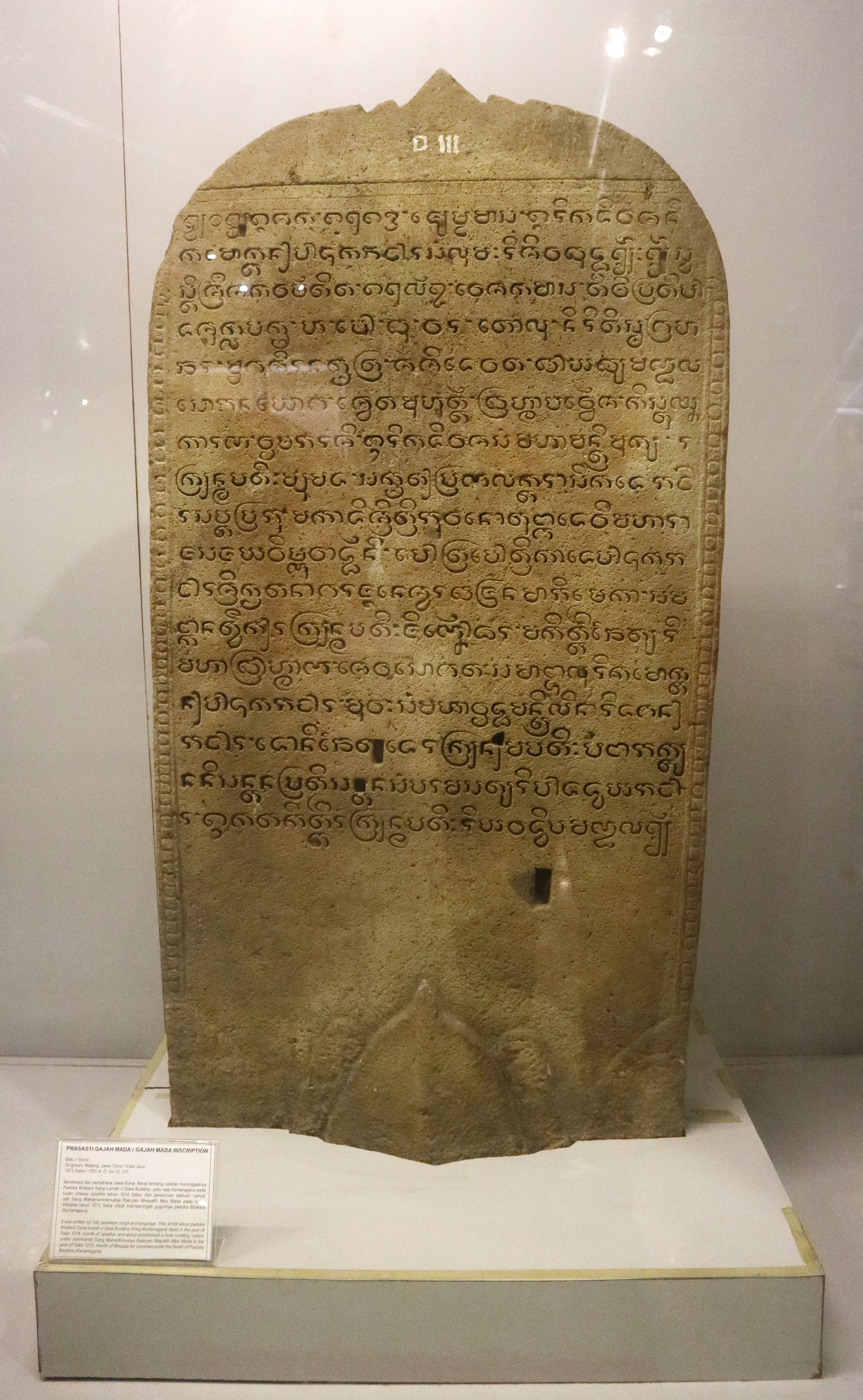
Gajah Mada inscription, dated 1273 Śaka (1351 AD), mentioned about a sacred caitya building dedicated by Gajah Mada for the late King Kertanegara of Singhasari.

The Nagarakretagama, written in 1365, depicts a sophisticated court with refined taste in art and literature and a complex system of religious rituals. The poet describes Majapahit as the centre of a huge mandala extending from New Guinea and Maluku to Sumatra and the Malay Peninsula. Local traditions in many parts of Indonesia retain accounts of 14th-century Majapahit's power in more or less legendary form. The direct administration of Majapahit did not extend beyond east Java and Bali, but challenges to Majapahit's claim to overlordship in outer islands drew forceful responses.

To revive the fortune of Malayu in Sumatra, in the 1370s, a Malay ruler of Palembang sent an envoy to the court of the first emperor of the newly established Ming dynasty. He invited China to resume the tributary system, just like Srivijaya did several centuries earlier. Learning this diplomatic manoeuvre, immediately King Hayam Wuruk sent an envoy to Nanking, convinced the emperor that Malayu was their vassal, and was not an independent country. Subsequently, in 1377, (Note: According to the Chinese sources, the event took place in 1376 or 1377, according to the Javanese about 1361. See) a few years after the death of Gajah Mada, Majapahit sent a punitive naval attack against a rebellion in Palembang, contributing to the end of the Srivijayan successor kingdom. Besides Gajah Mada, Another famous military leader was Adityawarman, known for his chronicle in Minangkabau.

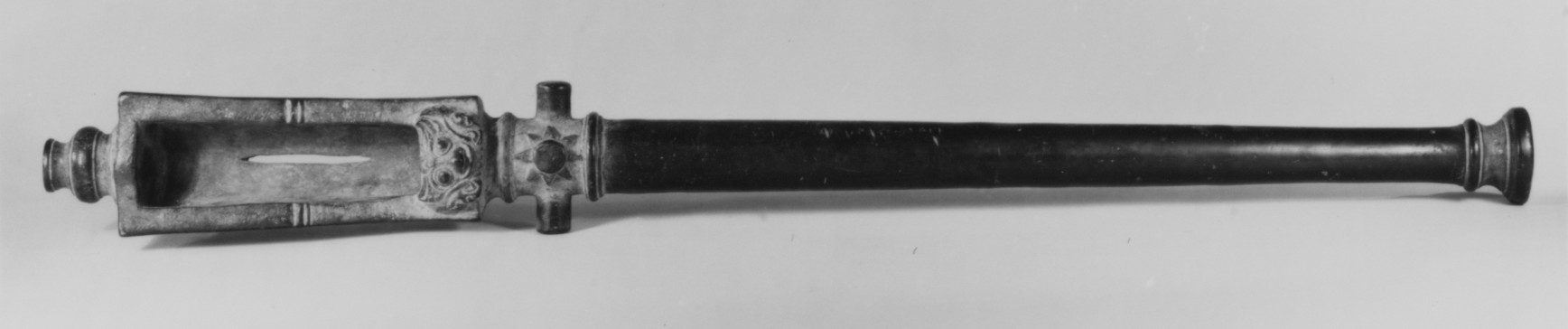
Bronze cannon, called cetbang, Metropolitan Museum of Art, New York, from c. 1470–1478 Majapahit. Note the Surya Majapahit emblem on the bronze cannon.

The nature of the Majapahit empire and its extent is subject to debate. It may have had limited or entirely notional influence over some of the tributary states, including Sumatra, the Malay Peninsula, Kalimantan, and eastern Indonesia, over which authority was claimed in the Nagarakretagama. Geographical and economic constraints suggest that rather than a regular centralised authority, the outer states were most likely to have been connected mainly by trade connections, which were probably a royal monopoly. It also claimed relationships with Champa, Cambodia, Siam, southern Burma, and Vietnam, and even sent missions to China. Although the Majapahit rulers extended their power over other islands and destroyed neighbouring kingdoms, their focus seems to have been on controlling and gaining a larger share of the commercial trade that passed through the archipelago.

About the time Majapahit was founded, Muslim traders and proselytisers began entering the area. The Troloyo/Tralaya tomb, a remnant of Islamic cemetery compound was discovered within the Trowulan area, the royal capital of Majapahit. Experts suggest that the cemetery was used between 1368 and 1611 AD, which means Muslim traders had resided in the capital as early as the mid-14th century during the reign of Hayam Wuruk. Two Muslim tombstones in Troloyo were dated from the 14th century (1368 AD, 1376 AD). The close proximity of the site with the kraton means there were Muslim people in close relation with the court.

=== Decline ===
Following Hayam Wuruk's death in 1389, Majapahit entered a period of decline with conflict over succession. Hayam Wuruk was officially succeeded by his nephew and son-in-law, Prince Vikramavardhana, who was married to Princess Kusumawardhani, Hayam Wuruk's only child by his primary wife. However, Hayam Wuruk had a son from a concubine, Bhre Wirabhumi, who also claimed the throne, eventually leading to the Regreg Civil War from 1405 to 1406.

The identity and full name of Bhre Wirabhumi is unclear; "Bhre" simply means "duke or duchess", and "Wirabhumi" is an area corresponding to the Blambangan Kingdom. According to the Pararaton, he was the son of Hayam Wuruk and a concubine, and was adopted as a foster son by Hayam Wuruk's aunt and uncle (as well as mother-in-law and father-in-law), Bhre Daha (Rajadewi) and Wijayarajasa. Later, Bhre Wirabhumi married Bhre Lasem Sang Alemu, the daughter of Hayam Wuruk's sister, Brhe Pajang.

According to the Nagarakretagama, the wife of Brhe Wirabhumi was Nagarawardhani, the daughter of Brhe Lasem (Indudewi). Indudewi was the daughter of Hayam Wuruk's aunt and uncle Bhre Daha (Rajadewi) and Wijayarajasa. The Nagarakretagama is considered more authoritative than the Pararaton, since it was written during Brhe Wirabhumi's lifetime.

By the time of Hayam Wuruk's death, Majapahit had lost its grip on its vassal states on the northern coasts of Sumatra and the Malay Peninsula—the latter of which, according to Chinese sources, would become a tributary state of the Ayutthaya Kingdom until the rise of the Malacca Sultanate as supported by the Ming dynasty.

In 1299, the Kingdom of Singapura had been established, and following a failed attempt to take Singapore in 1350, Majapahit finally sacked and destroyed the Kingdom in 1398, after approximately a month-long siege by three hundred jong war ships and 200,000 men. The last king, Parameswara, fled to the west coast of the Malay Peninsula to establish the Malacca Sultanate in 1400.

==== Regreg War ====
A war of succession, called the Regreg War, is thought to have occurred from 1405 to 1406. The war was fought between the Kedhaton Kulon (western court in Trowulan), led by King Vikramavardhana, and the Kedhaton Wetan (eastern court in the Blambangan Kingdom), led by Bhre Wirabhumi. King Vikramavardhana was victorious, and Bhre Wirabhumi was caught and decapitated. However the civil war drained financial resources, exhausted the kingdom, and weakened Majapahit's grip on its outer vassals and colonies.

==== Wikramawardhana and Ming expedition ====
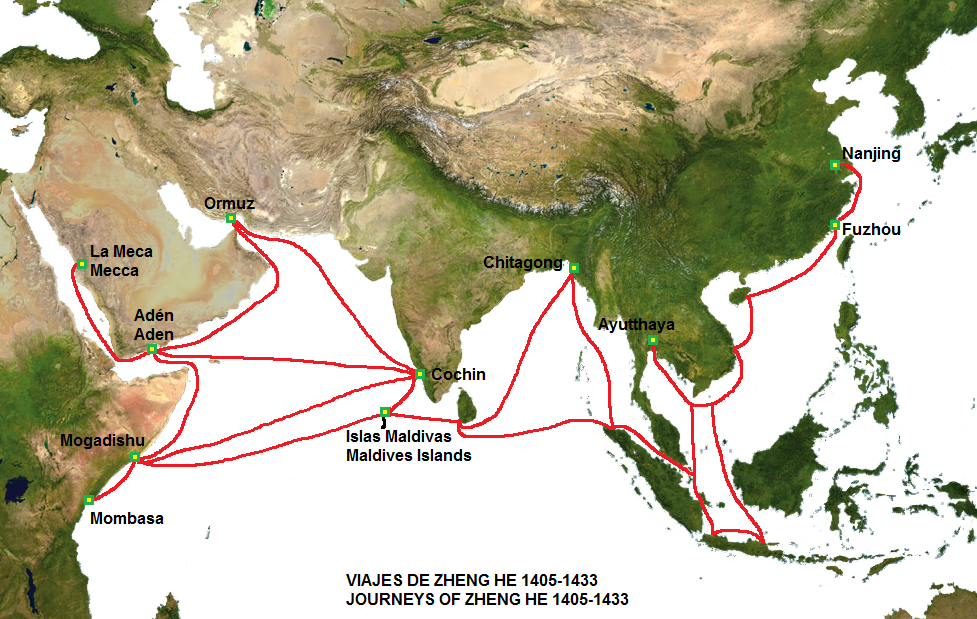
The route of the voyages of Zheng He's fleet, including Majapahit ports

During the reign of Wikramawardhana, a series of Ming armada naval expeditions led by Zheng He, a Muslim Chinese admiral, arrived in Java several times spanning the period from 1405 to 1433. These Chinese voyages visited numbers of ports in Asia as far as Africa, including Majapahit ports. It was said that Zheng He has paid a visit to the Majapahit court in Java.

These massive Chinese voyages were not merely a naval exploration, but also a show of power and a display of geopolitical reach. The Chinese Ming dynasty had recently overthrown the Mongol-led Yuan dynasty, and was eager to establish their hegemony in the world, which changed the geopolitical balance in Asia. The Chinese intervened in the politics of the southern seas by supporting Thais against the declining Khmer Empire, supporting and installing allied factions in India, Sri Lanka and other places in Indian Ocean coasts. However, perhaps the most significant Chinese intervention was its support for the newly established Sultanate of Malacca as a rival and counter-weight to the Majapahit influence of Java.

Previously, Majapahit had succeeded in asserting its influence in Malacca strait by containing the aspiration of Malay polities in Sumatra and the Malay Peninsula to ever reach the geopolitical might like those of Srivijaya. The Hindu Majapahit was the most powerful maritime power in Southeast Asian seas that time and were opposed to Chinese expansion into their sphere of influence. The Ming's support for Malacca and the spread of Islam propagated by both Malacca and Zheng He's treasure fleet has weakened Majapahit maritime influence in Sumatra, which caused the northern part of the island to increasingly converting to Islam and gained independence from Majapahit, leaving Indragiri, Jambi and Palembang, remnants of the old Srivijaya, the only suzerainty under Majapahit in Sumatra, (Note: According to the History of Ming, only these areas in Sumatra were still mentioned as under Javanese / Majapahit supremacy at the time. Read) bordering Pagaruyung Kingdom on the west and independent Muslim kingdoms on the north.

This Ming dynasty voyages are extremely important for Majapahit historiography, since Zheng He's translator Ma Huan wrote Yingya Shenglan, a detailed description of Majapahit, which provides valuable insight on the culture, customs, and also various social and economic aspects of Java during Majapahit period.

The Chinese provided systematic support to Malacca, and its sultan made at least one trip to personally pay obeisance to the Ming emperor. Malacca actively encouraged the conversion to Islam in the region, while the Ming fleet actively established Chinese-Malay Muslim community in coastal northern Java, thus created a permanent opposition to the Hindus of Java. By 1430, the expeditions had established Muslim Chinese, Arab and Malay communities in northern ports of Java such as Semarang, Demak, Tuban, and Ampel; thus Islam began to gain a foothold on the northern coast of Java. Malacca prospered under Chinese Ming protection, while the Majapahit were steadily pushed back.

==== Queen Suhita ====
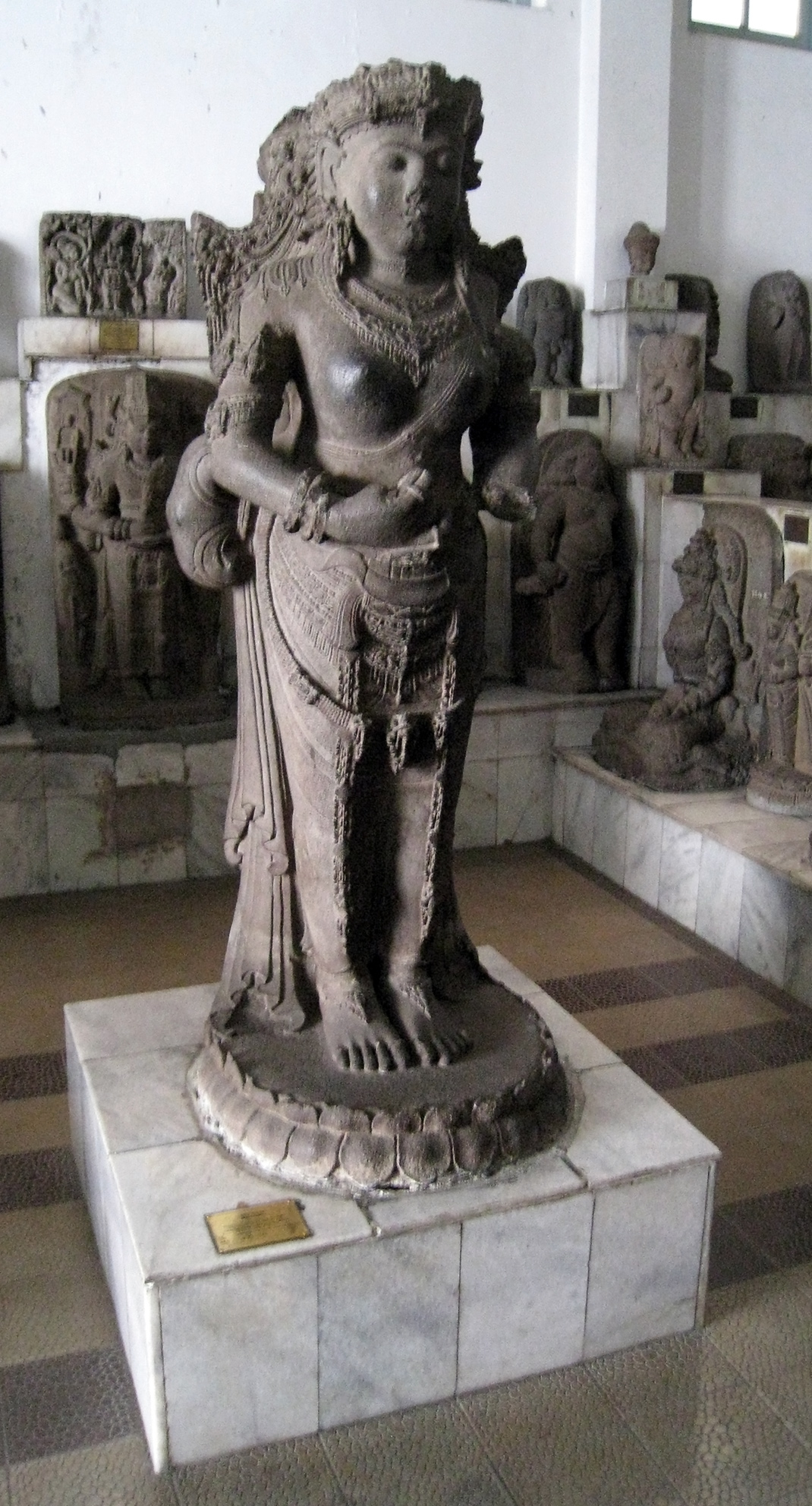
The mortuary deified portrait statue of Queen Suhita (reign 1429–1447), discovered at Jebuk, Kalangbret, Tulungagung, East Java, National Museum of Indonesia

Wikramawardhana ruled until 1429 and was succeeded by his daughter Suhita, who ruled from 1429 to 1447. She was the second child of Wikramawardhana by a concubine who was the daughter of Wirabhumi. She was married to future Kelantan king Iskandar Shah or Kemas Jiwa in 1427. Both of them had a daughter together and he stayed with her in Java. Kelantan was ruled by his brother, Sultan Sadik Muhammad Shah, until his death in 1429. This necessitated Kemas Jiwa to return and took the throne as Iskandar, where he declared Kelantan as Majapahit II in Mahligai. Although Pararaton listed her husband as Bhra Hyang Parameswara Ratnapangkaja, which suggests she remarried after Kemas Jiwa returned.

The reign of Suhita was the second time Majapahit was reigned by a queen regnant after her great-grandmother Tribhuwana Wijayatunggadewi. Her reign is immortalized in Javanese legend of Damarwulan, as it involves a maiden queen named Prabu Kenya in the story, and during Suhita's reign there was a war with Blambangan as stated in the legend.

In 1447, Suhita died and was succeeded by Kertawijaya, her brother. He ruled until 1451. After Kertawijaya died, Bhre Pamotan became a king with formal name Rajasawardhana. He died in 1453. A three-year kingless period was possibly the result of a succession crisis. Girisawardhana, son of Kertawijaya, came to power in 1456. He died in 1466 and was succeeded by Singhawikramawardhana.

==== The divide ====
In 1468 Prince Kertabhumi rebelled against Singhawikramawardhana, promoting himself as the king of Majapahit. The deposed Singhawikramawardhana retreated upstream of Brantas River, moved the kingdom's capital further inland to Daha (the former capital of Kediri kingdom), effectively splitting Majapahit, under Bhre Kertabumi in Trowulan and Singhawikramawardhana in Daha. Singhawikramawardhana continued his rule until he was succeeded by his son Girindrawardhana (Ranawijaya) in 1474.

In between this period of the dividing court of Majapahit, the kingdom found itself unable to control its western part of the already crumbling empire. The rising power of the Sultanate of Malacca began to gain effective control of the Malacca Strait in the mid-15th century and expanding its influence to Sumatra. And amidst these events, Indragiri and Siantan, according to Malay Annals were given to Malacca as a dowry for the marriage of a Majapahit princess and the sultan of Malacca, further weakening Majapahit's influence on the western part of the archipelago. Kertabhumi managed to stabilize this situation by allying with Muslim merchants, giving them trading rights on the north coast of Java, with Demak as its centre and in return asked for their loyalty to Majapahit. This policy boosted the Majapahit treasury and power but weakened Hindu-Buddhism as its main religion because Islamic proselytizing spread faster, especially in Javanese coastal principalities. Hindu-Buddhist followers' grievances later paved the way for Ranawijaya to defeat Kertabumi.

Dates for the end of the Majapahit Empire range from 1478, traditionally described in sinengkalan or chandrasengkala (chronogram) Sirna ilang kertaning bhumi that is correspond to 1400 Śaka, to 1527. (Note: The year 1400 Śaka is marked among Javanese today with candrasengkala "sirna ilang kertaning bumi" (the wealth of earth disappeared and diminished) (sirna = 0, ilang = 0, kerta = 4, bumi = 1).) The year 1478 was the year of Sudarma Wisuta war, when Ranawijaya's army under general Udara (who later became vice-regent) breached Trowulan defences and killed Kertabumi in his palace, but not the actual fall of Majapahit itself as a whole.

Demak sent reinforcements under Sunan Ngudung, who later died in battle and was replaced by Sunan Kudus, but they came too late to save Kertabumi although they managed to repel the Ranawijaya army. This event is mentioned in Trailokyapuri (Jiyu) and Petak inscription, where Ranawijaya claimed that he already defeated Kertabhumi and reunited Majapahit as one Kingdom. Ranawijaya ruled from 1474 to 1498 with the formal name Girindrawardhana, with Udara as his vice-regent. This event led to the war between the Sultanate of Demak and Daha since Demak rulers were descendants of Kertabhumi.

During this period, Demak, being the dominant ruler of the Javanese coastal lands and Java as a whole, seized the region of Jambi and Palembang in Sumatra from Majapahit.

==== Demak invasion and the fall of Majapahit ====
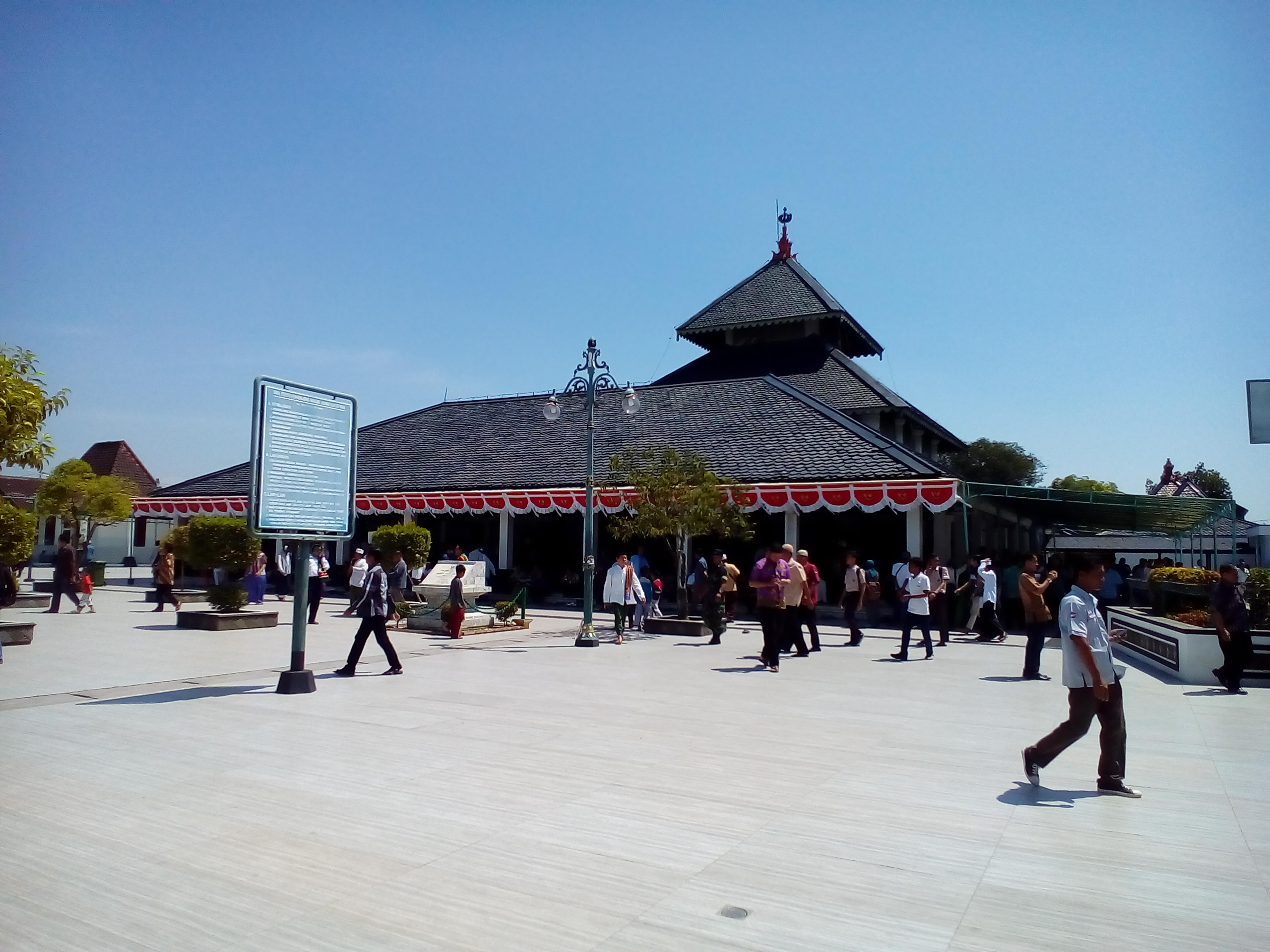
Demak was the earliest Islamic polity in Java that replaced Majapahit.

In 1498, there was a turning point when Girindrawardhana was deposed by his vice-regent, Udara. After this coup, the war between Demak and Majapahit receded, since Raden Patah, Sultan of Demak, left Majapahit alone like his father had done before, some source said Udara agreed to become a vassal of Demak, even marrying Raden Patah's youngest daughter.

Meanwhile, in the west, Malacca was captured by Portuguese in 1511. The delicate balance between Demak and Majapahit ended when Udara, seeing an opportunity to eliminate Demak, asked for Portuguese help in Malacca, forcing Demak to attack both Malacca and Majapahit under Adipati Yunus to end this alliance. (Note: V. Another paper noted that the reasons for the attacks Demak (led by Adipati Yunus) to Majapahit (Girindrawardhana period) are a backlash against Girindrawardhana who had defeated Adipati Yunus' grandfather Prabu Bhre Kertabumi (Prabu Brawijaya V).)

With the fall of Majapahit, crushed by Demak in 1527, the Muslim emerging forces finally defeated the remnants of the Majapahit kingdom in the early 16th century; and with the fall of Majapahit, a large number of courtiers, artisans, priests, and members of the royalty moved east to the island of Bali. The refugees fled to the east to avoid Demak retribution for their support for Ranawijaya against Kertabhumi.

Demak came under the leadership of Raden (later crowned as Sultan) Patah, who was acknowledged as the legitimate successor of Majapahit. According to Babad Tanah Jawi and Demak tradition, the source of Patah's legitimacy was because their first sultan, Raden Patah, was the son of Majapahit king Brawijaya V with a Chinese concubine. Another argument supports Demak as the successor of Majapahit; the rising Demak sultanate was easily accepted as the nominal regional ruler, as Demak was the former Majapahit vassal and located near the former Majapahit realm in eastern Java.

Demak established itself as the regional power and the first Islamic sultanate in Java. After the fall of Majapahit, the Hindu kingdoms in Java only remained in Pasuruan, Panarukan, and Blambangan on the eastern edge and Sunda Kingdom Pajajaran in the western part. Gradually Hindu communities began to retreat to the mountain ranges in East Java and also to the neighbouring island of Bali. A small enclave of Hindu communities remain in the Tengger mountain range.

== Culture ==
The Majapahit capital of Trowulan was grand and known for its great annual festivities. The main event of the administrative calendar took place on the first day of the month of Caitra (March–April), the first month of the lunar calendar, when representatives from all territories paying tax or tribute to Majapahit came to the capital to pay court. Majapahit's territories were roughly divided into three types: the palace and its vicinity; the areas of east Java and Bali which were directly administered by officials appointed by the king; and the outer dependencies which enjoyed substantial internal autonomy.

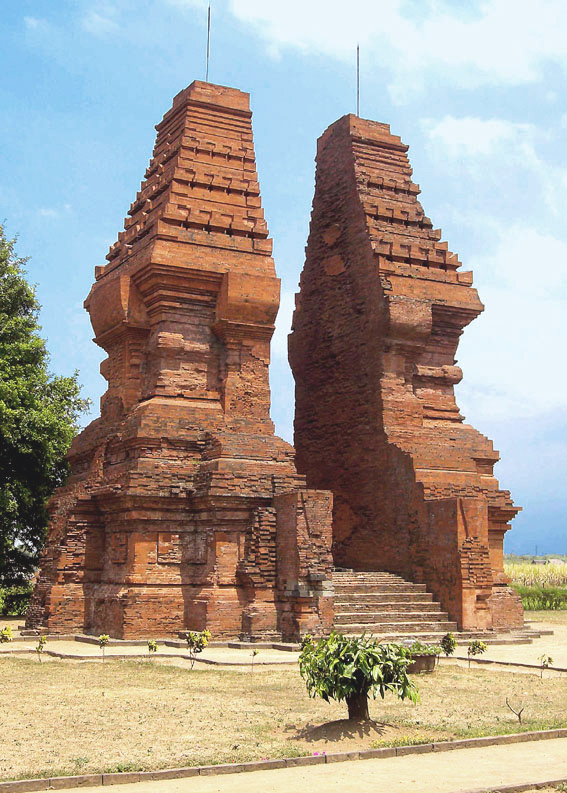
Wringin Lawang, the 15.5-metre-tall (51 ft) red brick split gate in Trowulan, believed to be the entrance of an important compound.

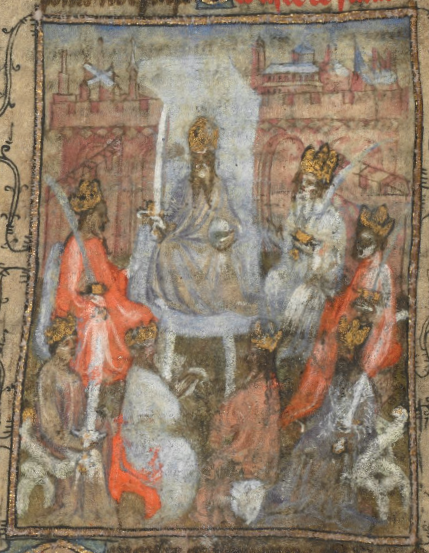
The king of Java and his seven vassal kings, as imagined in a 15th-century English manuscript containing the accounts of Friar Odoric.

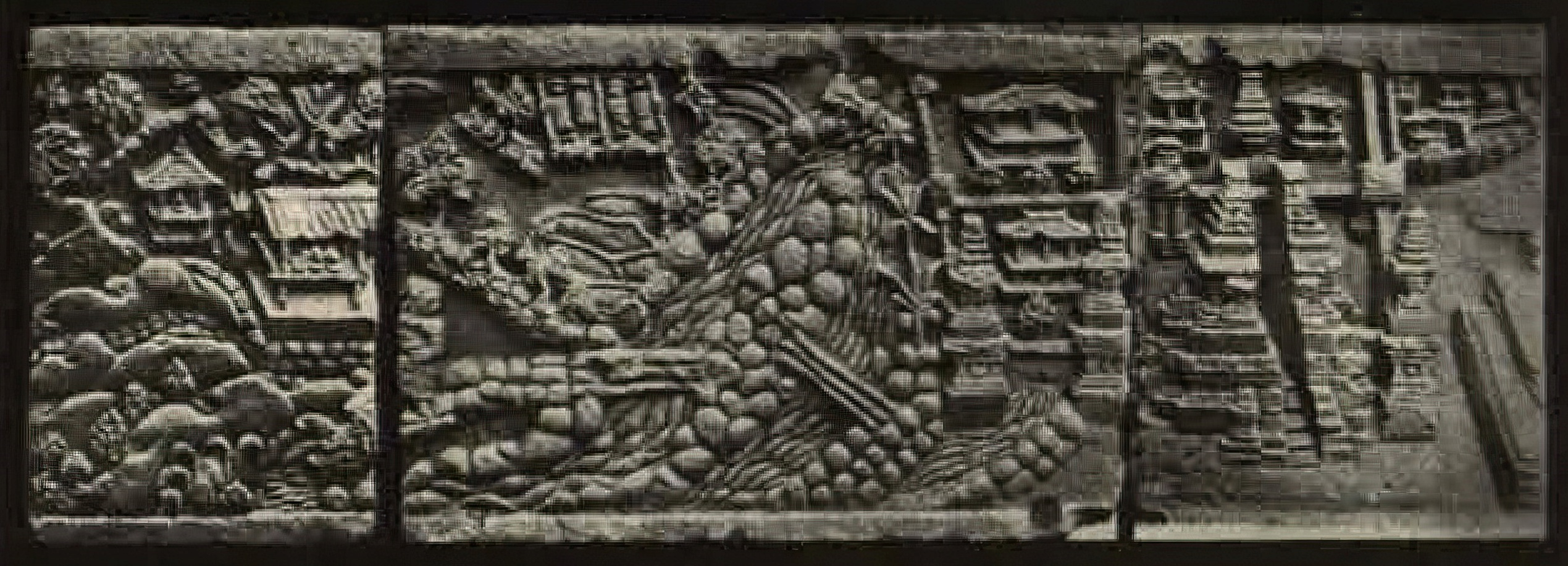
Relief from Trowulan: Countryside, walled kampung, ramparts, and temple.

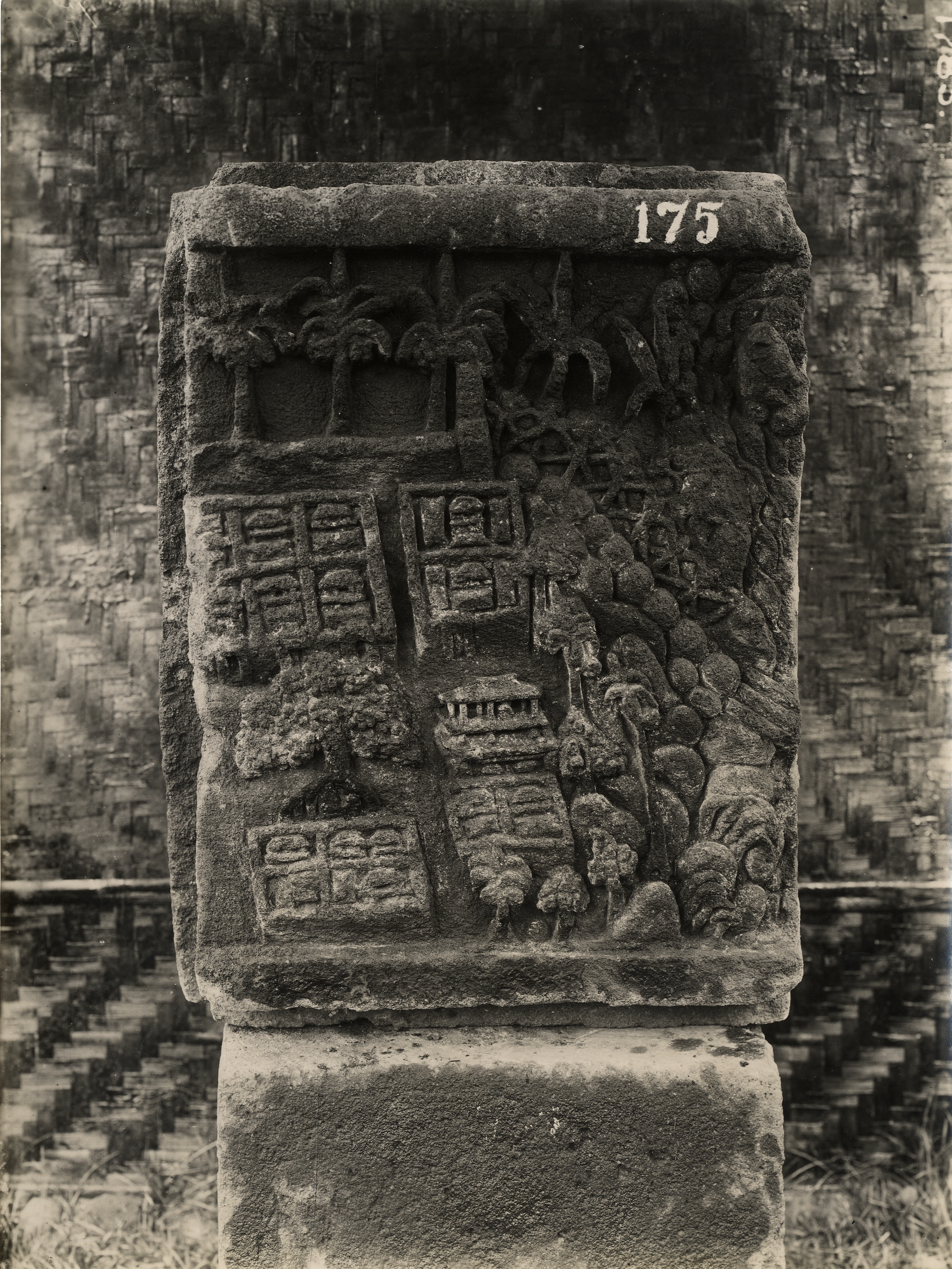
A relief from Trowulan, showing several walled compounds and a larger wall to their north.

The first European record about Majapahit came from the travel log of the Italian Mattiussi, a Franciscan friar. In his book Travels of Friar Odoric of Pordenone, he visited several places in today's Indonesia: Sumatra, Java, and Banjarmasin in Borneo, between 1318 and 1330. He was sent by the Pope to launch a mission into the Asian interiors. In 1318 he departed from Padua, crossed the Black Sea into Persia, all the way across Calcutta, Madras, and Sri Lanka. He then headed to Nicobar island to Sumatra, before visiting Java and Banjarmasin. He returned to Italy by land through Vietnam, China, all the way through the silkroad to Europe in 1330.

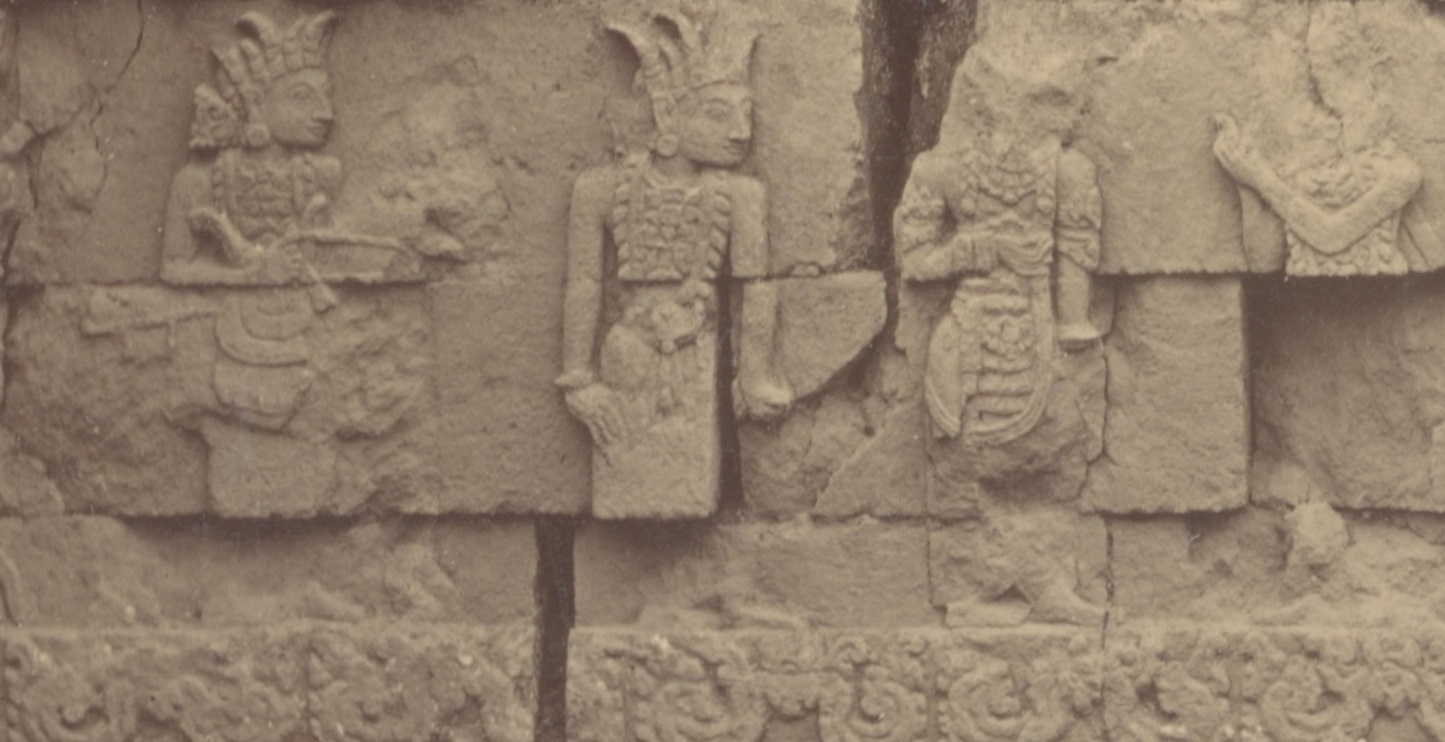
An armored horse rider, two armored warriors, and a noble figure. From Penataran temple, ca. 1347.

In his book, he mentioned that he visited Java without explaining the exact place he had visited. He said that king of Java ruled over seven other kings (vassals). (Note: Odoric of Pordenone mentioned that the King of Java ruled over "seven crowned kings", possibly refer to Bhattara Saptaprabhu or seven Bhattara or Bhres (Dukes/Duchess), which is seven influential elders that rules over seven nagara or regional kingdoms, corresponds to Majapahit provinces in East and Central Java; i.e. Kahuripan, Daha, Tumapel, Wengker, Lasem, Pajang, and Mataram.) He described the richness of this island, and recorded that the Mongol emperors had repeatedly tried to attack Java, but always ended up in failure and managed to be sent back to the mainland. (Note: The Javanese victory on repelling the Mongol forces during the formation of Majapahit seems to be popular news being retold in Java over generations.) His full account is as follows:

In the neighbourhood of that realm (Sumatra) is a great island, Java by name, which hath a compass of a good three thousand miles. And the king of it hath subject to himself seven crowned kings. Now this island is populous exceedingly, and is the second best of all islands that exist. For in it grow camphor, cubebs, cardamoms, nutmegs, and many other precious spices. It hath also very great store of all victuals save wine.

The king of this island hath a palace which is truly marvellous. For it is very great, and hath very great staircases, broad and lofty, and the steps thereof are of gold and silver alternately. Likewise the pavement of the palace hath one tile of gold and the other of silver, and the wall of the same is on the inside plated all over with plates of gold, on which are sculptured knights all of gold, which have great golden circles round their heads, such as we give in these parts to the figures of saints. And these circles are all beset with precious stones. Moreover, the ceiling is all of pure gold, and to speak briefly, this palace is richer and finer than any existing at this day in the world.

Now the Great Khan of Cathay many a time engaged in war with this king; but this king always vanquished and got the better of him. And many other things there be which I write not.

The Javanese kingdom mentioned in this record is Majapahit, and the time of his visit was in 1321 during the reign of Jayanegara (1309–1328).

In Yingya Shenglan – a record about Zheng He's expedition (1405–1433) – Ma Huan describes the culture, customs, various social and economic aspects of Chao-Wa (Java) during Majapahit period. Ma Huan visited Java during Zheng He's 4th expedition in 1413, during the reign of Majapahit king Wikramawardhana. He describes his travel to Majapahit capital, first, he arrived at the port of Tu-pan (Tuban) where he saw large numbers of Chinese settlers migrated from Guangdong and Chou Chang. Then he sailed east to thriving new trading town of Ko-erh-hsi (Gresik), Su-pa-erh-ya (Surabaya), and then sailing inland into the river by smaller boat to the southwest until reached the river port of Chang-ku (Changgu). Continued travel by land to the southwest he arrived in Man-che-po-I (Majapahit), where the king stay. There are about 200 or 300 foreign families resides in this place, with seven or eight leaders to serve the king. The climate is constantly hot, like summer. He describes the king's costumes; wearing a crown of gold leaves and flowers or sometimes without any headgear; bare-chested without wearing a robe, the bottom parts wears two sashes of embroidered silk. Additional silk rope is looped around the waist as a belt, and the belt is inserted with one or two short blades, called pu-la-t'ou (belati or more precisely kris dagger), walking barefoot. When travelling outside, the king rides an elephant or an ox-drawn carriage.

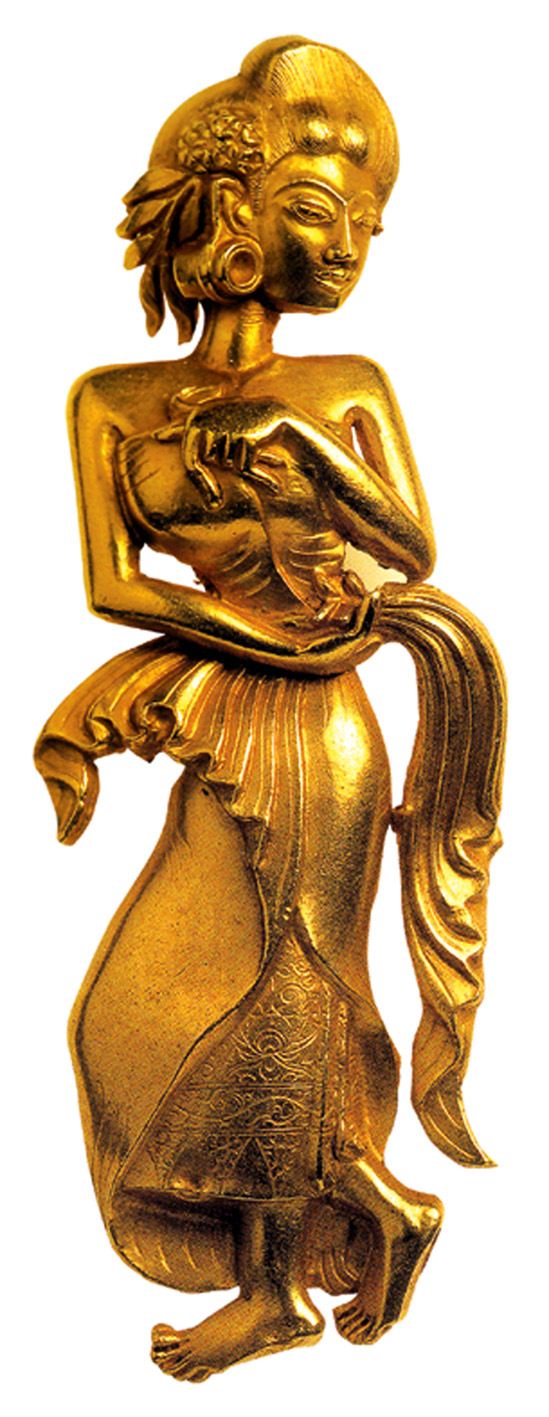
The graceful Bidadari Majapahit, golden celestial apsara in Majapahit style.

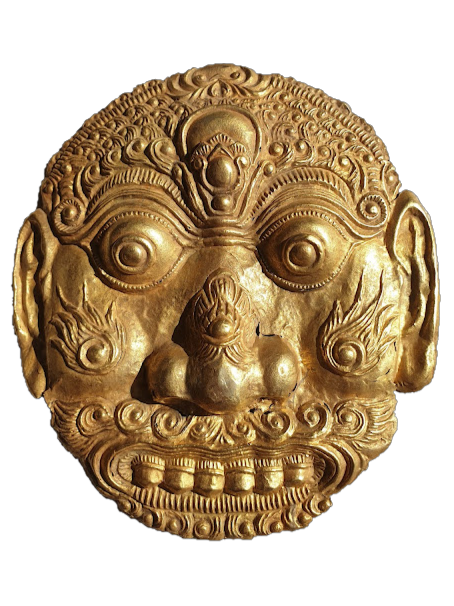
A silver-alloyed gold mask from East Java, Indonesia, 14th century.

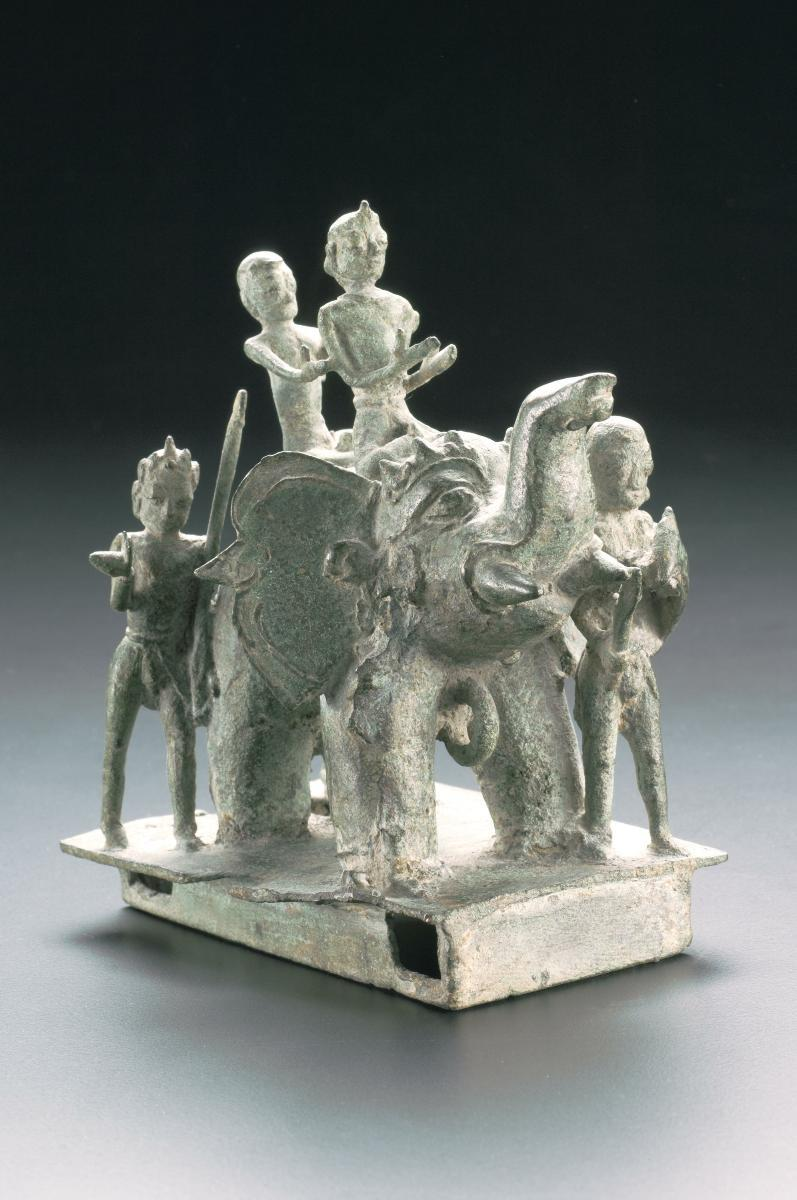
A statue of bronze elephant with riders, made in the 13th–14th century East Java (Singhasari and Majapahit era).

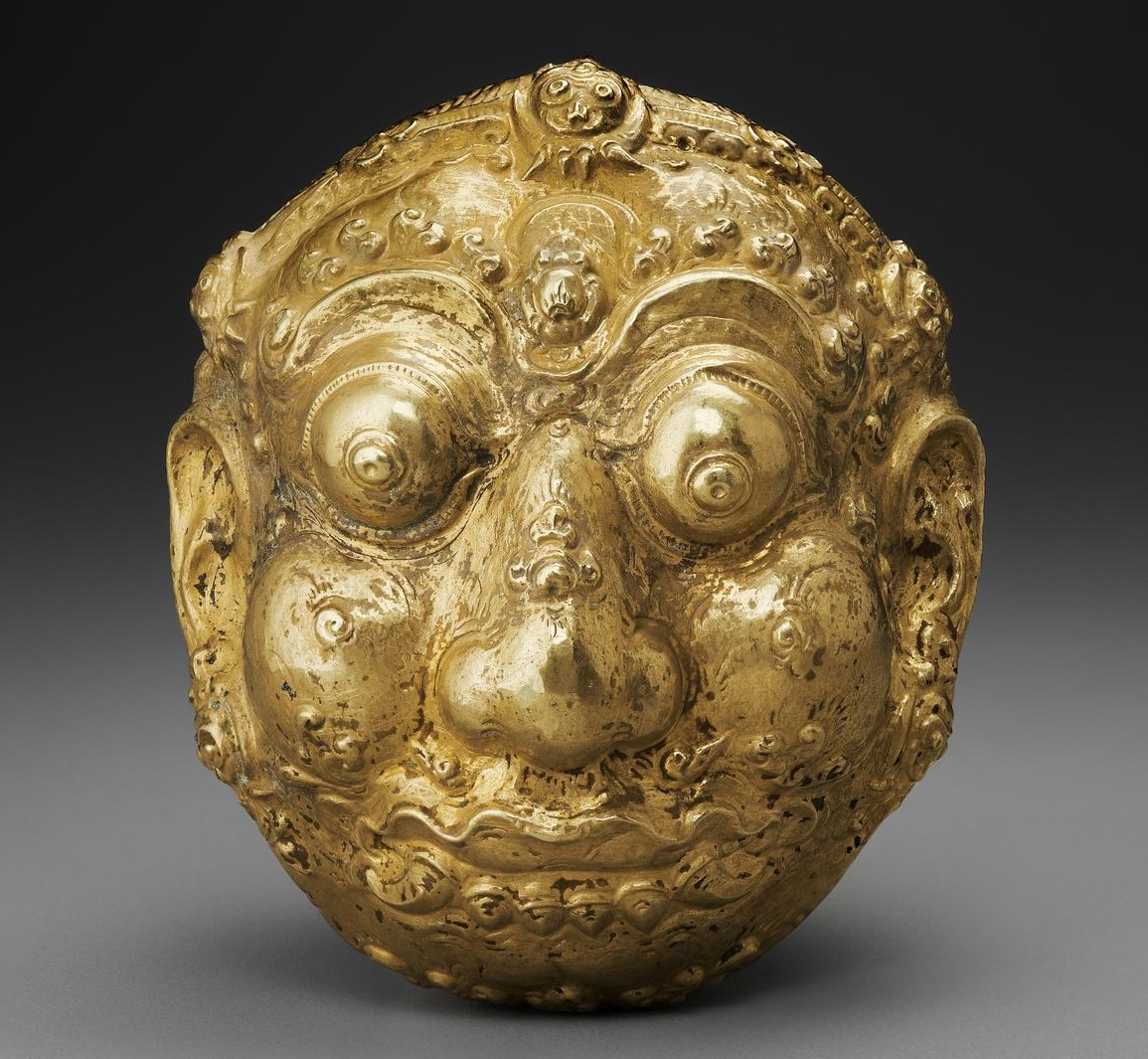
Gold Kāla rattle, 11th–14th century, from Malang, East Java.

Commoners' clothing for men is without headgear and women arrange their hair like a bun secured with a hairpin. They wore clothing on the upper body and wrapped unstitched fabrics around the bottom part, (Note: In the same fashion as traditional costumes of how Balinese wore unstitched sarong around their waist or how Javanese wore kain batik around their waist) Men, from a boy aged three to elders, slipped pu-la-t'ou (dagger) in their belt. The dagger are made entirely of steel, featuring intricate motifs. The handles are made of materials such as gold, rhino horn, or ivory, carved with a depiction of a human or a demon.

Majapahit people, men and women, favoured their head. (Note: One's head is considered sacred since it is where the soul resides, beliefs and customs still practised in modern Indonesia.) If someone was touched on his head, or if there is a misunderstanding or argument when drunk, they will instantly draw their knives and stab each other.

The population of the country did not have a bed or chair to sit and to eat they do not use a spoon or chopsticks. Men and women enjoy chewing betel nut mixed with, betel leaves, and white chalk made from ground mussels shells. They eat rice for the meal, first, they took a scoop of water and soak betel in their mouth, then wash their hands and sit down to make a circle; getting a plate of rice soaked in butter (probably coconut milk) and gravy, and eat using hands to lift the rice and put it in their mouth. When receiving guests, they will offer the guests, not the tea, but with betel nut.

The population consisted of Muslim merchants from the west (Arab and Muslim Indians, but mostly those from Muslim states in Sumatra), Chinese (claimed to be descendants of Tang dynasty), and unrefined locals. The king held annual jousting tournaments. About the marriage rituals; the groom pays a visit to the house of the bride's family, the marriage union is consummated. Three days later, the groom escorts his bride back to his home, where the man's family beat drums and brass gongs, blowing pipes made from coconut shells (senterewe), beating a drum made from bamboo tubes (probably a kind of bamboo gamelan or kolintang), and light fireworks. Escorted in front, behind, and around by men holding short blades and shields. While the bride is a matted-hair woman, with an uncovered body and barefooted. She wraps herself in embroidered silk, wears a necklace around her neck adorned with gold beads, and bracelets on her wrist with ornaments of gold, silver and other precious ornaments. Family, friends and neighbours decorate a decorative boat with betel leaf, areca nut, reeds and flowers are sewn, and arrange a party to welcome the couple on such a festive occasion. When the groom arrives home, the gong and drum are sounded, they will drink wine (possibly arrack or tuak) and play music. After a few days, the festivities end.

About the burial rituals, the dead body was left on the beach or empty land to be devoured by dogs (for lower-class), cremated, or committed into the waters (Javanese: Larung). The upper-class performed sati, a suicide ritual by widowed wives, concubines or female servants, through self immolation by throwing themselves into flaming cremation fire.

In this record, Ma Huan also describes a musical troupe travelling during full moon nights. Numbers of people holding shoulders creating an unbroken line while singing and chanting in unison, while the families whose houses being visited would give them copper coins or gifts. He also describes a class of artisans that draws various images on paper and give a theatrical performance. The narrator tells the story of legends, tales and romance drawn upon a screen of rolled paper. This kind of performance is identified as wayang bébér, an art of story-telling that has survived for many centuries in Java.

Portuguese diplomat Tomé Pires, who visited the archipelago in 1512, recorded the culture of Java in the late Majapahit era, after his visit to the island between March and June 1513. Pires' account tells about the lords and nobles in Java. They are described as:

...tall and handsome, lavishly adorned, and they have richly caparisoned horses. They use krises, swords, and lances of many kinds, all inlaid with gold. They are great hunters and horsemen – the horse had stirrups all inlaid with gold and inlaid saddles, which are not to be found anywhere else in the world. The Javanese lords are so noble and exalted that there is no nation to compare with them over a wide area in these parts. They have their head shorn – half tonsured – as a mark of beauty, and they always run their hands over their hair from the forehead upwards unlike what European did. The lords of Java are revered like gods, with great respect and deep reverence.

The lords go out hunting or pleasure-seeking in such exalted style. They spend all their time in pleasures, the retinues had so many lances in holders of gold and silver, so richly inlaid, with so many harriers, greyhounds and other dogs; and they have so many pictures painted with images and hunting scenes. Their clothes are adorned with gold, their krises, swords, knives, cutlasses are all inlaid with gold; they have numbers of concubines, jennets, elephants, oxen to draw the wagons of gilt and painted woodwork. The nobilities go out in triumphal cars, and if they go by sea they go in painted and ornamented kelulus; there are beautiful apartments for their women, other places for the nobles who accompanied him.

=== Religion ===
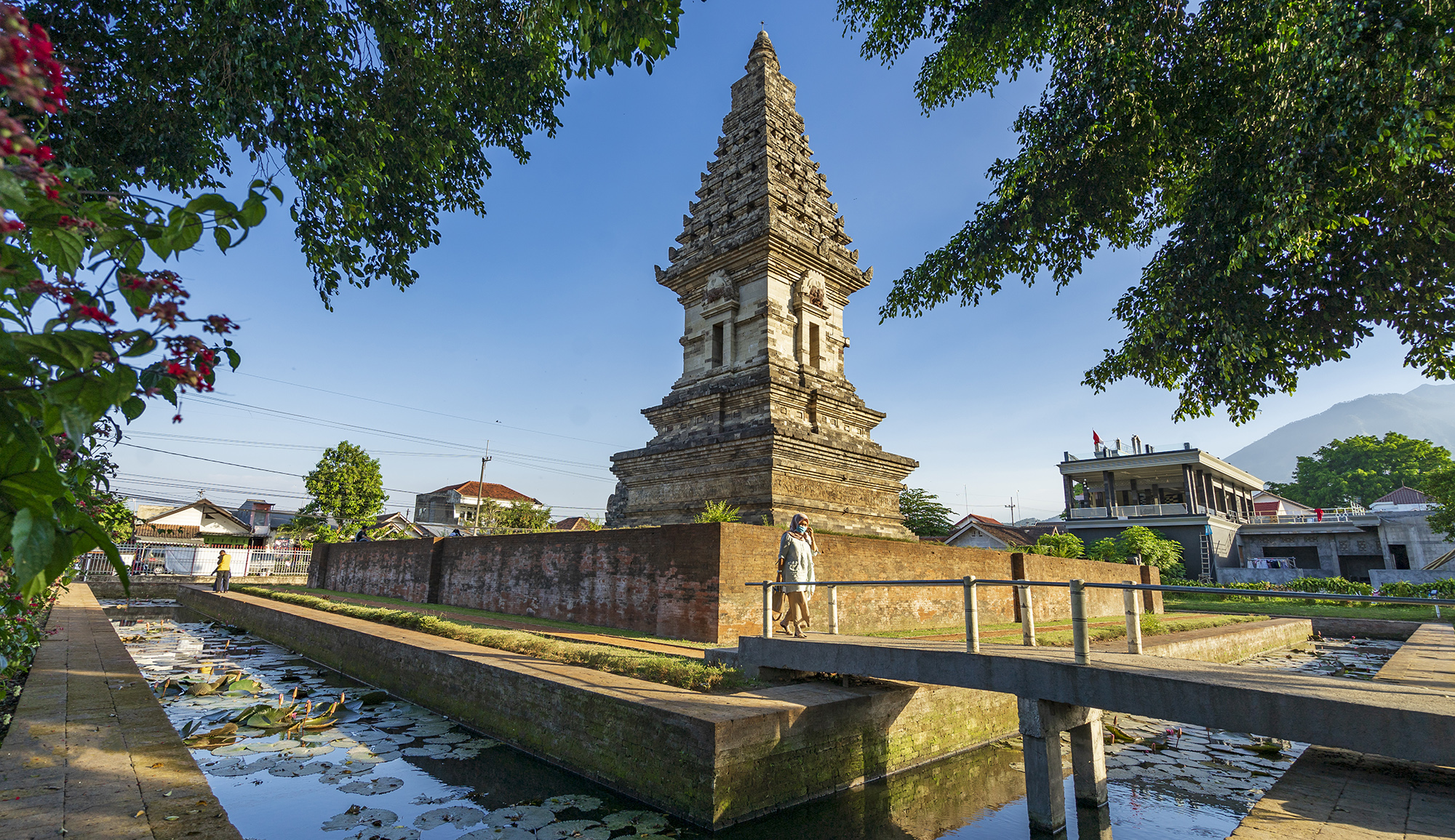
Jawi Temple, a syncretic Hindu-Buddhist temple of Shiva-Buddha faith, dated from late 13th century Singhasari kingdom, which later renovated and preserved during the Majapahit period

Buddhism, Shaivism, and Vaishnavism were all practised: the king was regarded as the incarnation of the three. The Nagarakretagama however, does not mention Islam, but there were certainly Muslim courtiers by this time.

Hinduism and Buddhism had already shaped the Javanese civilisation, religion, and spiritualism since the earlier era, from the 9th century Mataram kingdom, Kahuripan, Kadiri, to Singhasari kingdom. It seems that both Hinduism and Buddhism were widely practised by Majapahit subjects. Nevertheless, native Javanese shamanism possibly still existed and was practised in peripheral rural regions.

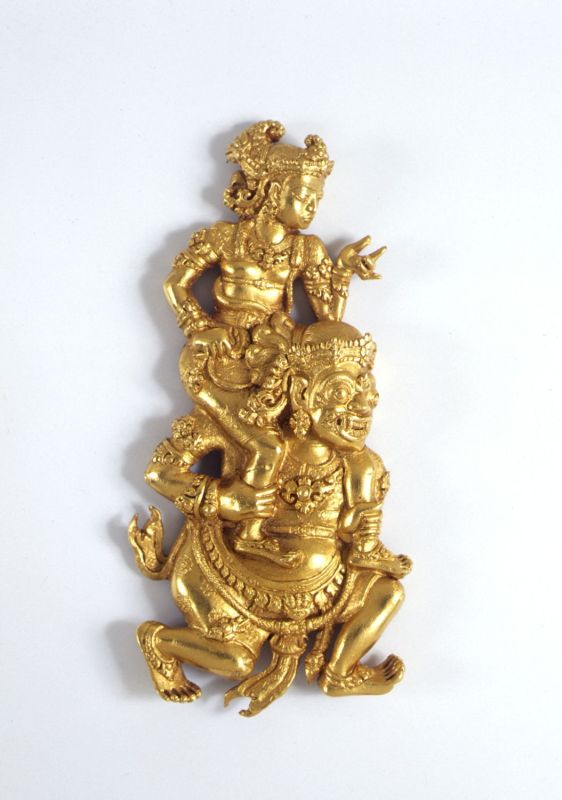
Gold figure from the Majapahit period representing Sutasoma being borne by the man-eater Kalmasapada

The monarch and most of the royal family adhered to Hinduism, with certain emphasis on the cult of their own preferred main deity, either Shiva, Vishnu, Durga or other deities. The first king of Majapahit, Kertarajasa Jayawardhana was posthumously portrayed as Harihara, the god combination of Shiva and Vishnu, in his mortuary temple in Candi Simping. Mahayana Buddhism however, was also favoured by the royal family and officials of Majapahit. For example, the queen of Majapahit Gayatri Rajapatni and Gajah Mada are known as Buddhists. Gayatri later posthumously portrayed as Prajnaparamita.

The state religion however, was possibly the Siwa Buddha, the Javanese syncretism of Shaivism and Buddhism which emphasised the similarities between Shiva and Buddha, who were both described as ascetics and spiritual teachers. The spiritual circumstances of Majapahit, seem to promote the harmony between the adherents of Shiva and Buddha. This is demonstrated in the manuscript Sutasoma written in the 14th century by Mpu Tantular which promotes religious tolerance between Hinduism and Buddhism, specifically the syncretic Shiva-Buddha doctrine.

During the Majapahit period, religious teaching played an important role in the society. The religious education could be done individually within households of kshatriya nobles and brahmana religious elites, or in a centre for religious teaching which resembles ashram or boarding school called Mandala or Kadewaguruan. A Kadewaguruan was usually located in remote areas far from habitation places, such as quiet forest, on hills or mountainous region. A Kadewaguruan is led by a mahāresi or high priest, who is also known as śiddharesi or dewaguru; hence the education centre is called Kadewaguruan.

=== Literature ===
The literature of Majapahit was the continuation of Javanese Kawi Hindu-Buddhist scholarly tradition that produces kakawin poem that has been developed in Java since the 9th century Medang Mataram era, all the way through Kadiri and Singhasari periods. Notable Javanese literary works dated from an earlier period, such as Kadiri's 11th century Kanwa's Arjunawiwaha, 12th-century Dharmaja's Smaradahana, Sedah's Bharatayuddha, Panuluh's Hariwangsa also popular Panji cycles are continuously preserved and rewritten by Rakawi (Hindu-Buddhist poet or scholar) in Majapahit era. Notable literary works that were produced in the Majapahit period among others are Prapanca's Nagarakretagama, Tantular's Sutasoma, and Tantu Pagelaran. Popular tale of Sri Tanjung and Damarwulan also dated from Majapahit period. These Old Javanese kakawins were written and composed by Rakawis (poets) to worship the king of the gods whose incarnation the king represented.

Nagarakretagama composed by Prapanca in 1365 is a vital source of the premier historical account of Majapahit historiography. While Sutasoma is an important literature for modern Indonesian nationhood, since the national motto Bhinneka Tunggal Ika, which is usually translated as Unity in Diversity, was taken from a pupuh (canto) of this manuscript.

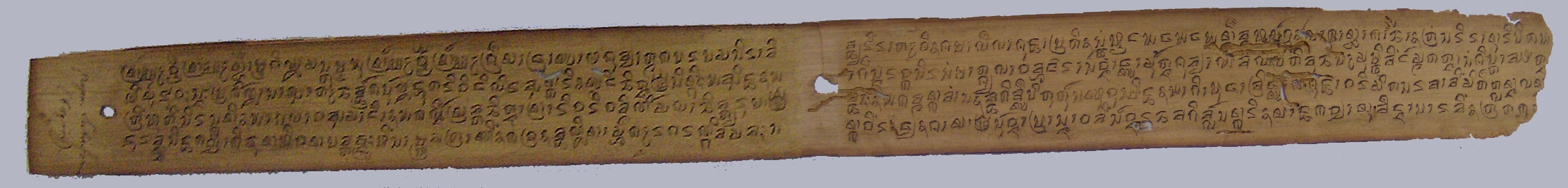
Palm leaf manuscript of Kakawin Sutasoma, a 14th-century Javanese poem

This quotation comes from Sutasoma canto 139, stanza 5. The full stanza reads as follows:

Rwâneka dhâtu winuwus Buddha Wiswa,
Bhinnêki rakwa ring apan kena parwanosen,
Mangka ng Jinatwa kalawan Siwatatwa tunggal,
Bhinnêka tunggal ika tan hana dharma mangrwa.

Originally, the poem was meant to promote the religious tolerance between the Hindu and Buddhist religions, specifically promote the syncretic Shiva-Buddha doctrine.

In Yingya Shenglan, Ma Huan describes the writing system used in Majapahit. For the writing, they had known the alphabet using So-li (Chola – Coromandel/Southern India) letters. There is no paper or pen, they use Chiao-chang (kajang) or palm leaf (lontar), written by scraping it with a sharp knife. They also have a developed language system and grammar.

=== Art ===
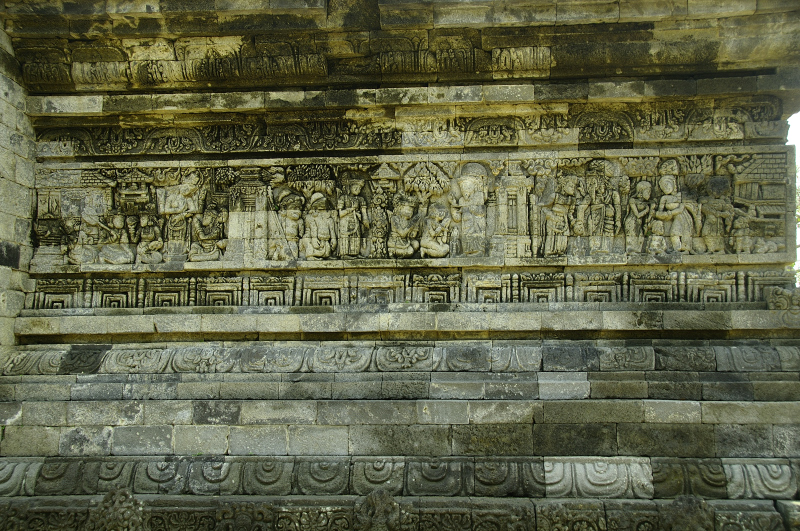
Bas reliefs of Tegowangi temple, dated from Majapahit period, demonstrate the East Javanese style.

The Pala school of art of the Indian Pala Empire influenced the art and architecture of Majapahit. Majapahit art was the continuation of East Javanese art, style and aesthetically developed since the 11th century during the Kediri and Singhasari period. Unlike the earlier naturalistic, relaxed and flowing figures of classical Central Java-style (Sailendra art c. 8th to 10th century), this East Javanese style demonstrates a stiffer pose, stylised and rendered in wayang-like figures, such as those carved on East Javanese temple's bas-reliefs. The bas-reliefs were projected rather flat from the background. This style was later preserved in Balinese art, especially in its Kamasan style classical paintings and Balinese wayang.

The statues of Hindu gods and Buddhist deities in Majapahit art were also the continuations of its previous Singhasari art. The statues of East Javanese period tends to be a stiffer and frontal-formal pose, compared to the statues of Central Javanese art (c. 9th century) that are more Indianized style, relaxed in tribhanga pose. The stiffer pose of Majapahit gods statues is probably in accordance with the statue's function as the deified portrayal self of the dead Majapahit monarch. The carving, however, is richly decorated, especially with a fine floral carving of lotus plants carved on the stela behind the statue. Examples of Majapahit statues are the Harihara statue from Simping temple, believed to be the deified portrayal of King Kertarajasa, the statue of Parwati believed to be the portrayal of Queen Tribhuwana, and a statue of the queen Suhita discovered at Jebuk, Kalangbret, Tulungagung, East Java.

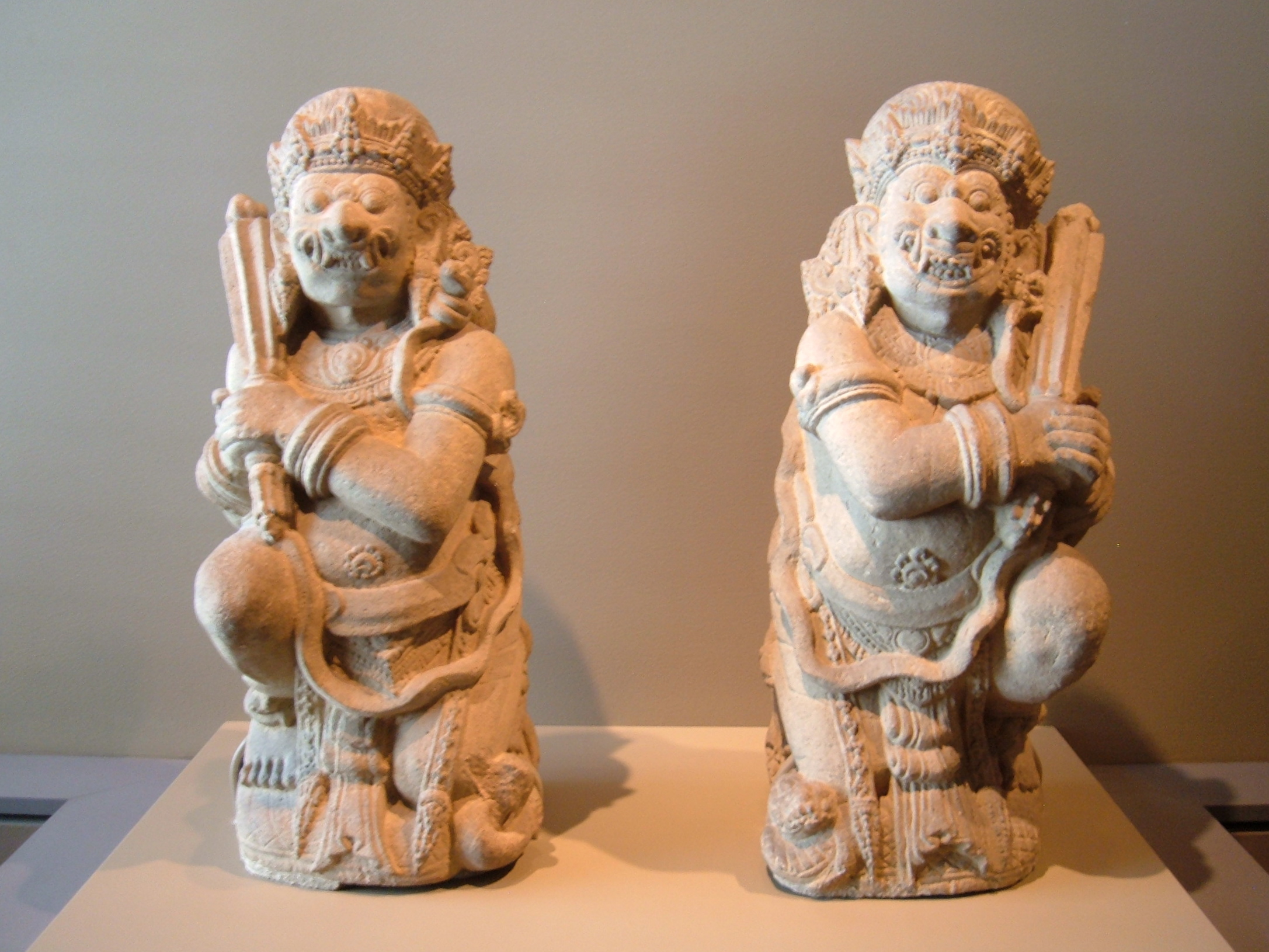
Pair of door guardians from a temple, Eastern Java, 14th century, Museum of Asian Art, San Francisco

Clay pottery and brick masonry are a popular feature in Majapahit art and architecture. The Majapahit Terracotta art also flourished in this period. Significant numbers of terracotta artefacts were discovered in Trowulan. The artefacts range from human and animal figurines, jars, vessels, water containers, piggy banks, bas reliefs, architectural ornaments, roof pinnacles, floor tiles, to pipes and roof tiles.

One of the most interesting findings is the Majapahit piggy bank. Several boar-shaped piggy banks have been discovered in Trowulan. It is probably the origin of Javanese-Indonesian word to refer for saving or money container. The word celengan in Javanese and Indonesian means both "savings" and "piggy bank". It was derived from the word celeng which means "wild boar", the suffix "-an" was added to denote its likeness. One important specimen is stored in the National Museum of Indonesia, it has been reconstructed since this large piggy bank has been found broken to pieces.

Terracotta money boxes also have been found in different shapes, such as tubular or boxes, with slits to slip coins. Another important terracotta artefact is the head figurine of a man popularly thought to be the depiction of Gajah Mada, although it is not certain about who was depicted in these figurines.

=== Architecture ===
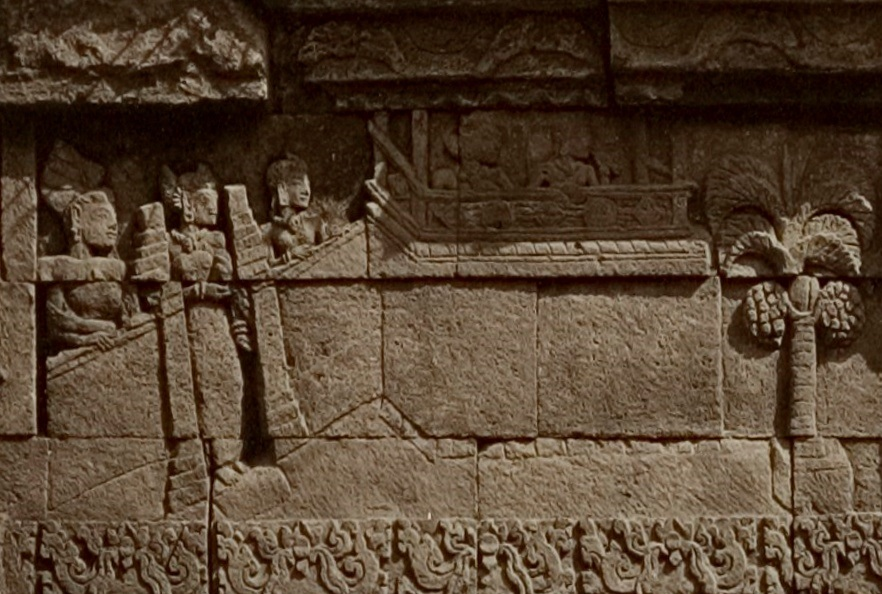
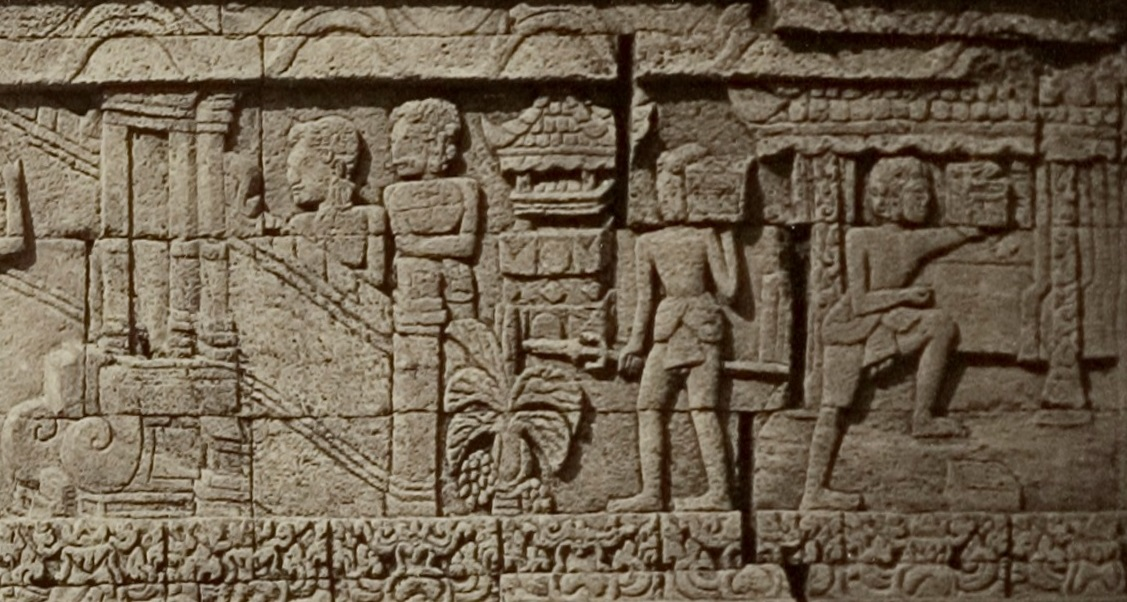
Reliefs from the main temple of the Panataran temple complex, depicting walls, gates, towers, and citizens

In his book Yingya Shenglan, Ma Huan also describes the Majapahit cities: most of them do not have walls surrounding the city or the suburbs. He describes the king's palace in Majapahit. The king's residence is surrounded with thick red brick walls more than three chang high (about 30 feet 7 inches or 9.32 metres), with length of more than 200 paces (340 yards or 310 metres) and on the wall there are two layers of gates, the palace is very well guarded and clean. The king's palace was a two-storey building, each of them 3 or 4 chang high (9.32–12.42 metres or 30.6–40.7 feet). It had wooden plank floors and exposed mats made from rattan or reeds (presumably palm leaves), where people sat cross-legged. The roof was made of hardwood shingles (Javanese: sirap) laid as tiles. This description of the palace is very different than that of Odoric of Pordenone, who visited Majapahit in the previous century during the reign of Jayanegara (1309–1328). The reason of this was because Ma Huan likely stayed at a special area reserved for envoys, which was still 1.5 days' journey away from the real Majapahit palace.

Odoric described the palace in more detail: The palace was described as being richer and finer than any existing palace at that time in the world. It had grand, broad, and lofty staircases; which the steps alternately made of gold and silver. The pavement of the palace was made alternately with one tile of gold and the other of silver, and the inside wall plated all over with gold, with knight sculptures of gold ornamented with precious stones. The ceiling of Majapahit palace was made of pure gold.

According to Ma Huan, the houses of commoners had thatched roofs (nipa palm leaves). Every family has a storage shed made of bricks, about 3 or 4 chi (48.9 inches or 124 centimetres) above the ground, where they kept the family property, and they lived on top of this building, to sit and sleep. Not every house in Java looked like this: According to the History of the Song dynasty, houses in Java are grand and handsome – they are decorated with gold and jade. The chronicle also noted that when Chinese merchants arrive there they are received as guests in a public building. This indicates that Ma Huan had not yet arrived at the center of Majapahit capital, and was only observing the outskirts.

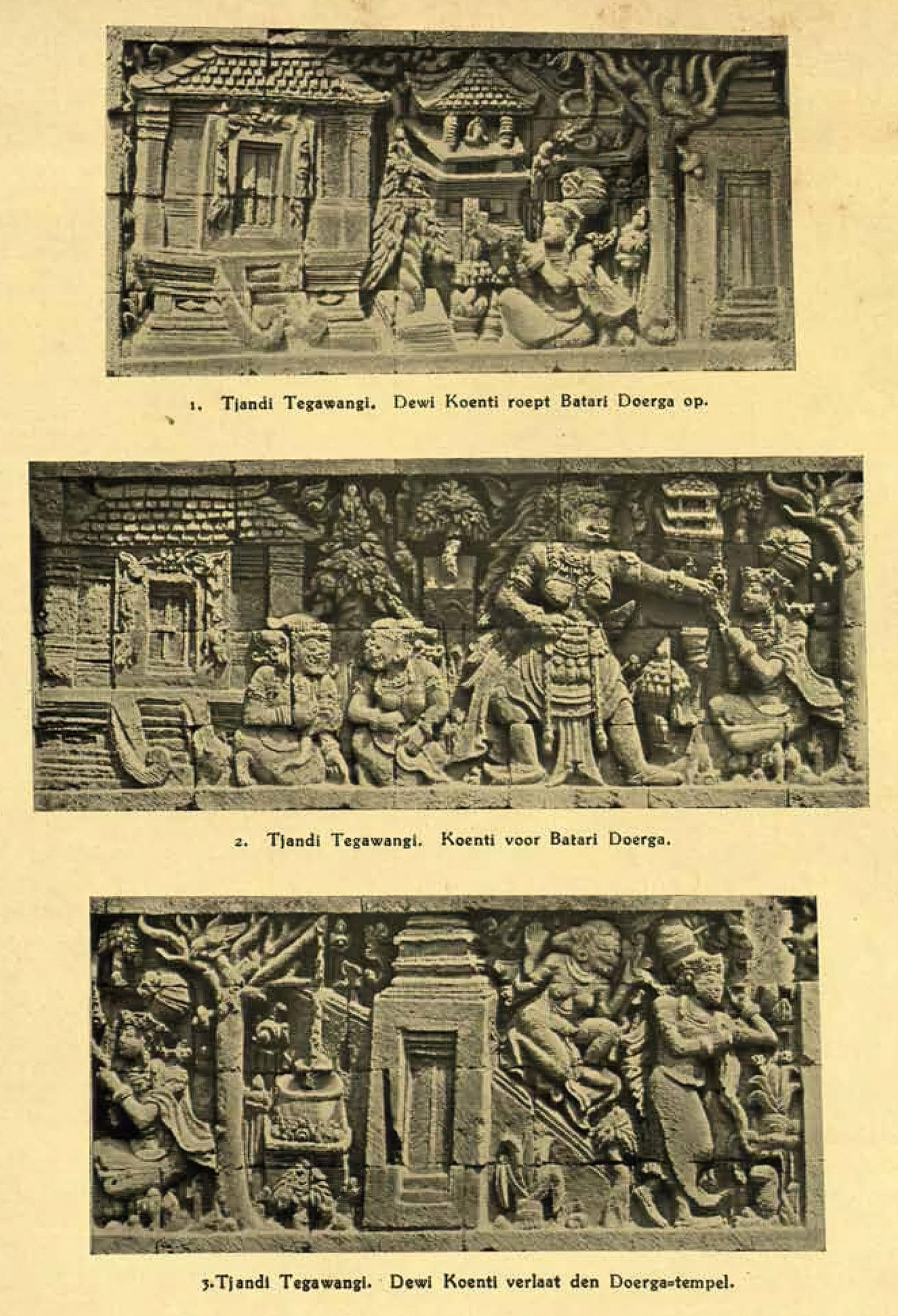
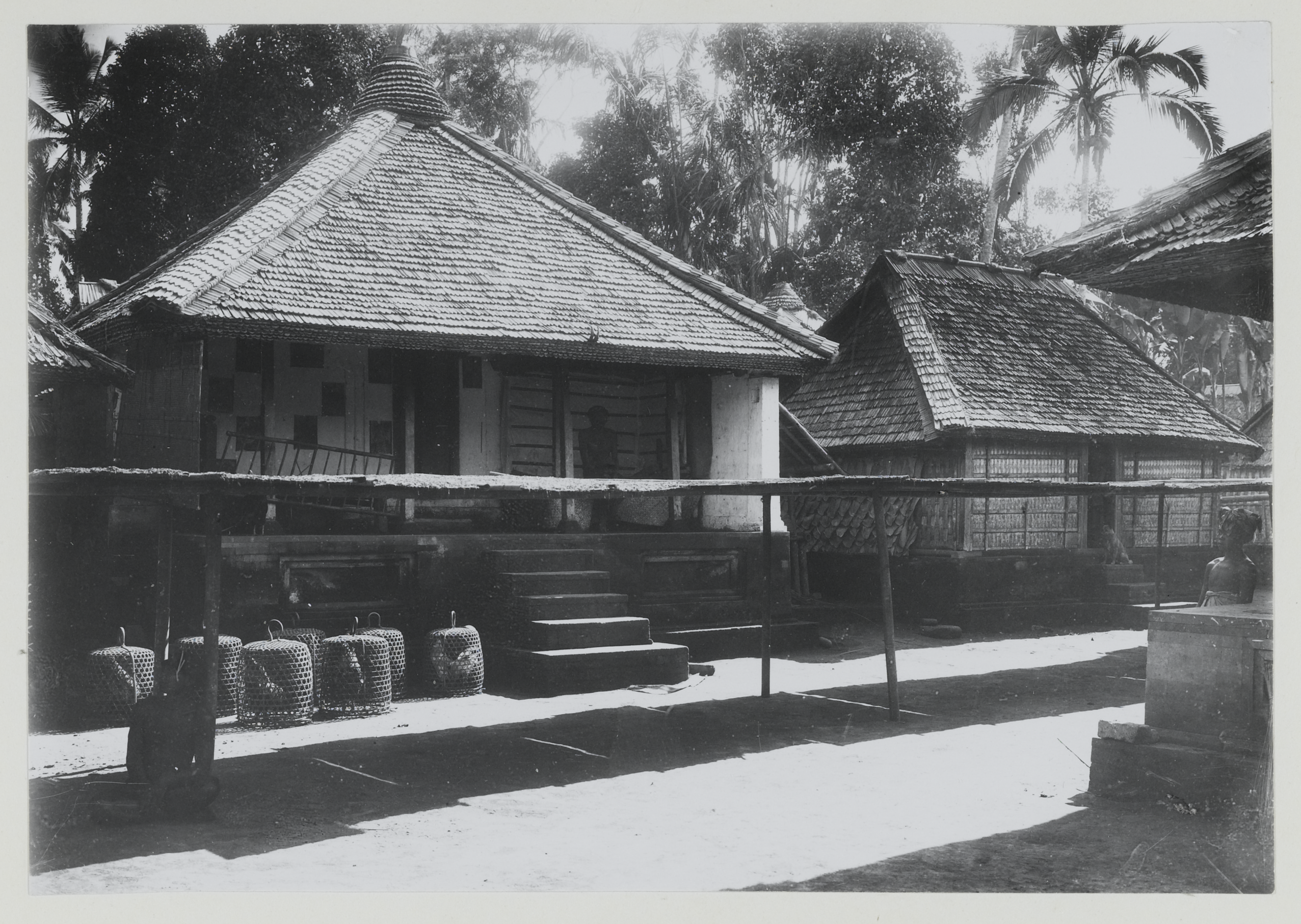
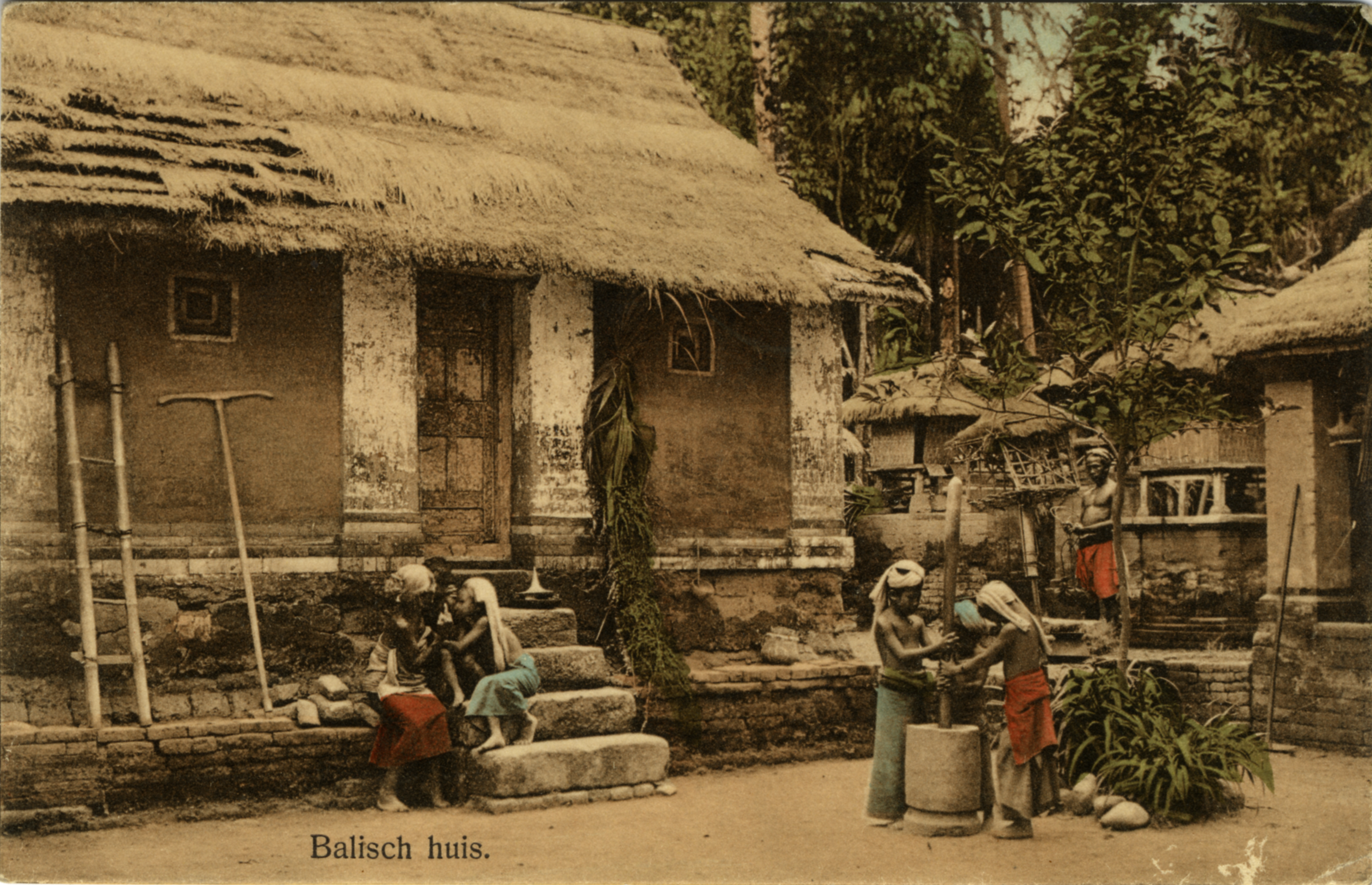
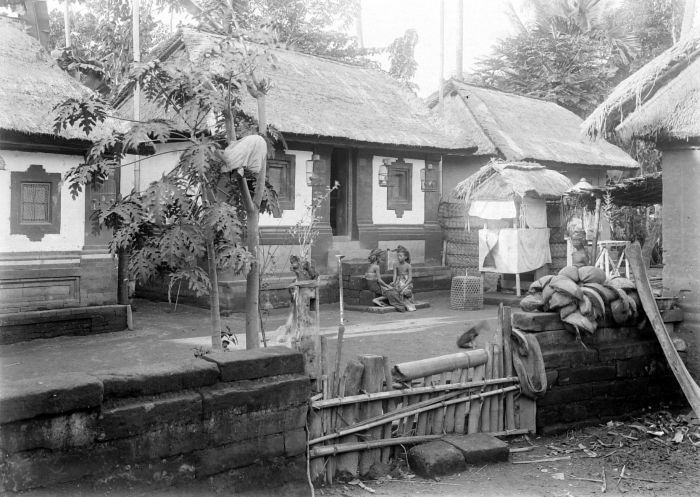
Tegowangi temple reliefs and traditional houses of Bali. Balinese architecture is deeply influence by Majapahit.

The Majapahit temple architecture follows the east Javanese styles, in contrast to earlier central Javanese style. This east Javanese temple style is also dated back from Kediri period c. 11th century. The shapes of Majapahit temples tend to be slender and tall, with a roof constructed from multiple parts of stepped sections formed a combined roof structure curved upward smoothly creating the perspective illusion that the temple is perceived taller than its actual height. The pinnacle of the temples are usually cube (mostly Hindu temples), sometimes dagoba cylindrical structures (Buddhist temples). Although some of the temples dated from Majapahit period used andesite or sandstone, the red bricks is also a popular construction material.

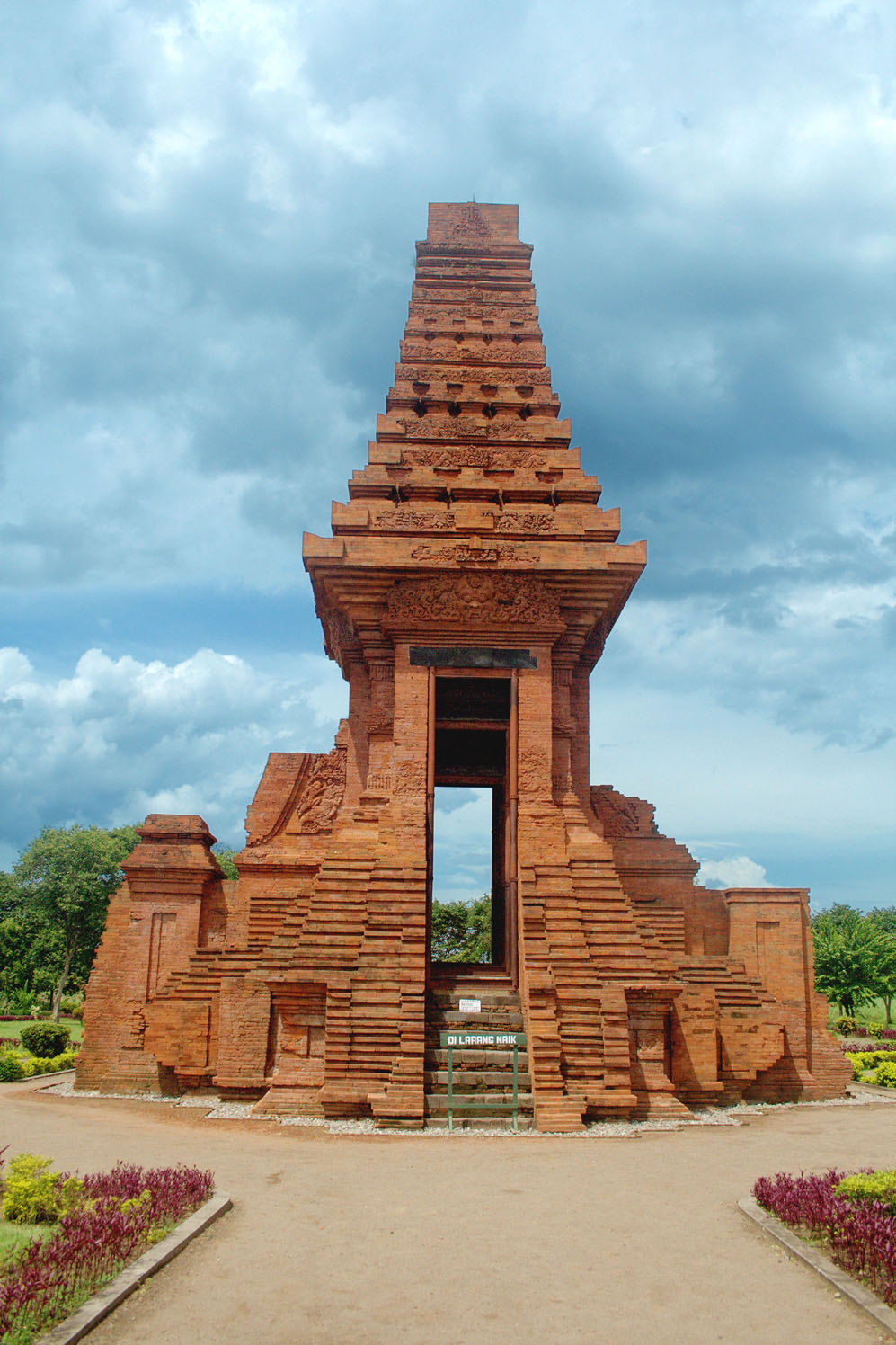
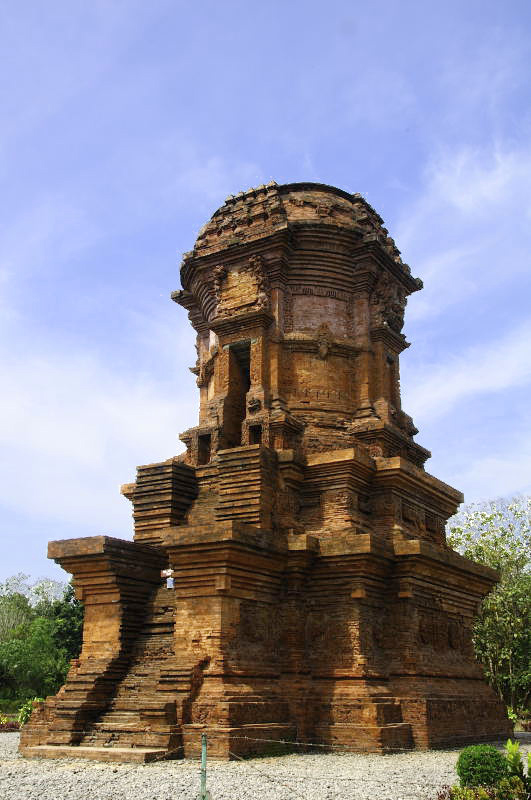
Left to right:
- The 16.5-metre tall Bajang Ratu Paduraksa gate, at Trowulan, echoed the grandeur of Majapahit.
- Jabung temple near Paiton, Probolinggo, East Java, dated from Majapahit period

Although brick had been used in the candi of Indonesia's classical age, it was Majapahit architects of the 14th and 15th centuries who mastered it. Making use of a vine sap and palm sugar mortar, their temples had a strong geometric quality. The example of Majapahit temples are Brahu temple in Trowulan, Pari in Sidoarjo, Jabung in Probolinggo, and Surawana temple near Kediri. Jabung temple was mentioned in Nagarakretagama as Bajrajinaparamitapura, despite some parts of its roof and pinnacles are now missing, it is one of the most well-preserved Majapahit temple architecture. Another example includes Gunung Gangsir temple near Pasuruan. Some of the temples are dated from the earlier period but renovated and expanded during Majapahit era, such as Penataran, the largest temple in East Java dated back to Kediri era. This temple was identified in Nagarakretagama as Palah temple and reported being visited by King Hayam Wuruk during his royal tour across East Java. Another notable temple of Eastern Javanese style is Jawi temple in Pandaan – also visited by King Hayam Wuruk, the temple was mentioned in Nagarakretagama as Jajawa, and was dedicated as a mortuary temple for his great-grandfather, King Kertanegara of Singhasari.

Some of the typical architectural styles are believed to be developed during Majapahit era; such as tall and slender roofed red brick gate commonly called as kori agung or paduraksa, and also split gate of candi bentar. The large split gate of Wringin Lawang located at Jatipasar, Trowulan, Mojokerto, East Java, is one of the oldest and the largest surviving candi bentar dated from Majapahit era. The candi bentar took shape of typical Majapahit temple structure – consists of three parts; foot, body and tall roof – evenly split into two mirroring structures to make a passage in the centre for people to walk through. This type of split gate has no doors and provides no real defensive purpose but narrowing the passage. It probably only served the ceremonial and aesthetic purpose, to create the sense of grandeur, before entering the next compound through tall roof paduraksa gate with enclosed door. The example of kori agung or paduraksa style gate is the elegant Bajang Ratu gate richly decorated with Kala demon, cyclops and also the bas-relief telling the story of Sri Tanjung. Those typical Majapahit architectural style has deeply influenced the Javanese and Balinese architecture of later period. The current prevalence of Majapahit style pendopo pavilion, candi bentar and paduraksa gates was owed to the influence of Majapahit aesthetics on Javanese and Balinese architecture.

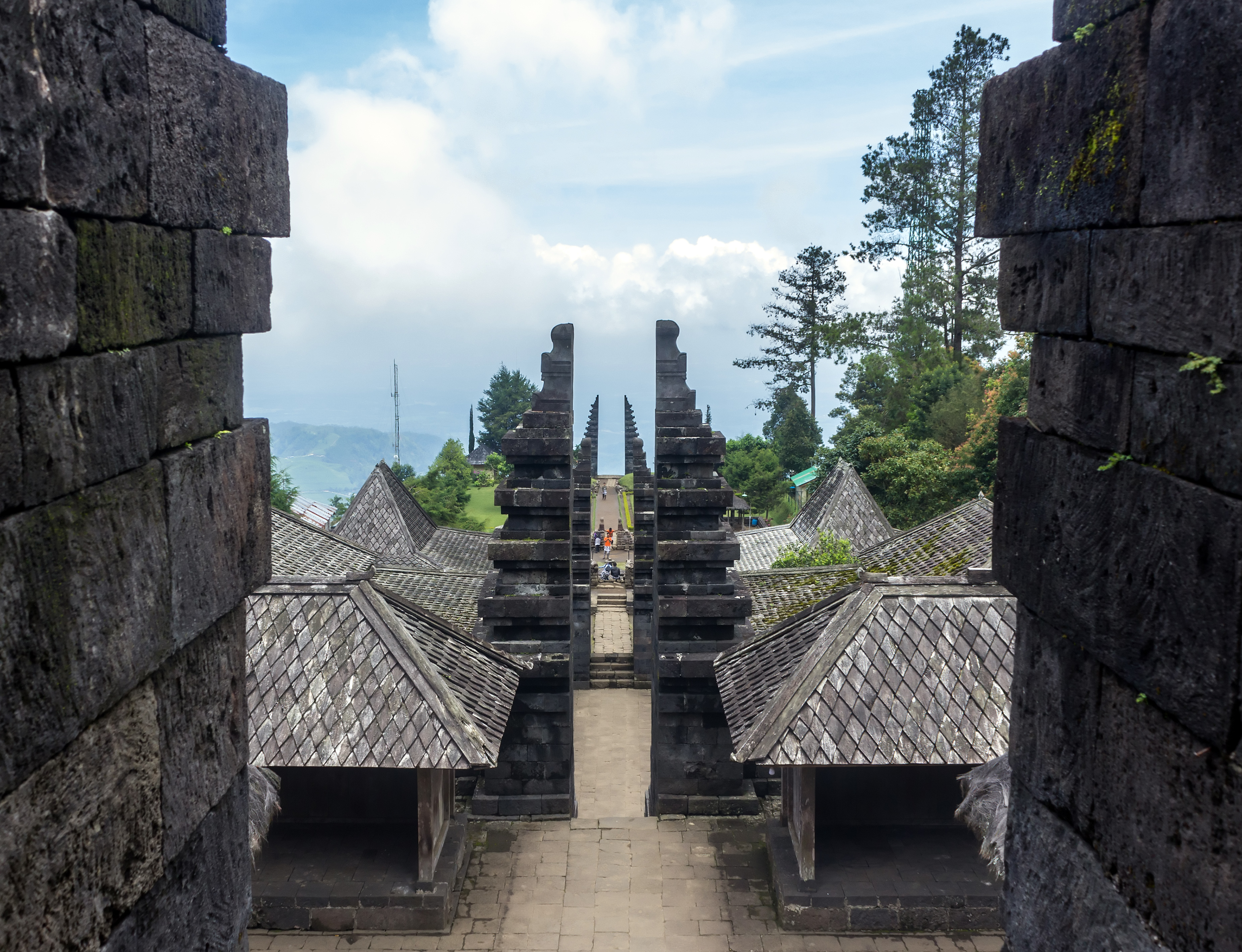
The stepped terraces, pavilions, and split gates of Cetho temple complex on mount Lawu slopes

In later period near the fall of Majapahit, the art and architecture of Majapahit witnessed the revival of indigenous native Austronesian megalithic architectural elements, such as Sukuh and Cetho temples on western slopes of Mount Lawu. Unlike previous Majapahit temples that demonstrate typical Hindu architecture of high-rise towering structure, the shape of these temples are step pyramid, quite similar to Mesoamerican pyramids. The stepped pyramid structure called Punden Berundak (stepped mounds) is a common megalithic structure during Indonesian prehistoric era before the adoption of Hindu-Buddhist culture.

== Economy ==
The Daoyi Zhi, which was written c. 1339 CE, mentioned about Java's wealth and prosperity of the period:

"The fields of Java are rich and its soil is level and well watered, therefore grain and rice are abundant, twice as much as in other countries. The people do not steal, and what is dropped on the road is not taken up. The common saying: "prosperous Java" means this country. Men and women wrap up their head and wear long clothes."

Also in Yingya Shenglan, Ma Huan reported the Javanese economy and market. Rice is harvested twice a year, and its grain is small. They also harvest white sesame and lentils, but there is no wheat. This land produces sapan wood (useful to produce red dye), diamonds, sandalwood, incense, puyang pepper, cantharides (green beetles used for medicine), steel, turtles, tortoiseshell, strange and rare birds; such as a large parrot as big as a hen, red and green parrots, five-colored parrots, (all of them can imitate the human voice), also guinea fowl, ' bird hanging upside down ', five-coloured pigeon, peacock, 'betel tree bird', pearl bird, and green pigeons. The beasts here are strange: there are white deer, white monkey, and various other animals. Pigs, goats, cattle, horses, poultries, and there are all types of ducks, however donkeys and geese are not found.

For the fruits, there are all kinds of bananas, coconut, sugarcane, pomegranate, lotus, mang-chi-shi (manggis or mangosteen), watermelon and lang Ch'a (langsat or lanzones). Mang-chi-shi – is something like a pomegranate, peel it like an orange, it has four lumps of white flesh, sweet and sour taste and very delicious. Lang-ch'a is a fruit similar to Loquat, but larger contained three blocky white flesh with a sweet and sour taste. Sugarcane has white stems, large and coarse, with roots reaching 3 chang (30 feet 7 inches). In addition, all types of squash and vegetables are there, just a shortage of peach, plum and leek.

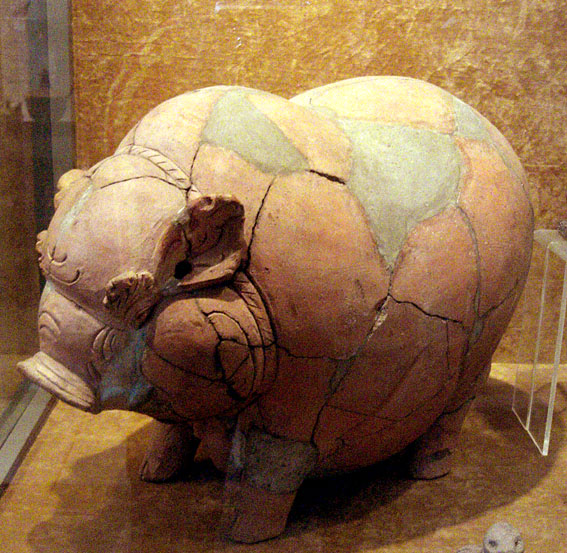
Majapahit terracotta piggy bank, 14th or 15th century Trowulan, East Java (collection of National Museum of Indonesia, Jakarta)

Taxes and fines were paid in cash. Javanese economy had been partly monetised since the late 8th century, using gold and silver coins. Previously, the 9th-century Wonoboyo hoard discovered in Central Java shows that ancient Javan gold coins were seed-shaped, similar to corn, while the silver coins were similar to buttons. In about the year 1300, in the reign of Majapahit's first king, an important change took place: the indigenous coinage was completely replaced by imported Chinese copper cash. About 10,388 ancient Chinese coins weighing about 40 kg were even unearthed from the backyard of a local commoner in Sidoarjo in November 2008. Indonesian Ancient Relics Conservation Bureau (BP3) of East Java verified that those coins dated as early as Majapahit era. The reason for using the foreign currency is not given in any source, but most scholars assume it was due to the increasing complexity of Javanese economy and a desire for a currency system that used much smaller denominations suitable for use in everyday market transactions. This was a role for which gold and silver are not well suited. These kepeng Chinese coins were thin rounded copper coins with a square hole in the centre of it. The hole was meant to tie together the money in a string of coins. These small changes – the imported Chinese copper coins – enabled Majapahit further invention, a method of savings by using a slit earthenware coin container. These are commonly found in Majapahit ruins, the slit in the small opening to put the coins in. The most popular shape is boar-shaped celengan (piggy bank).

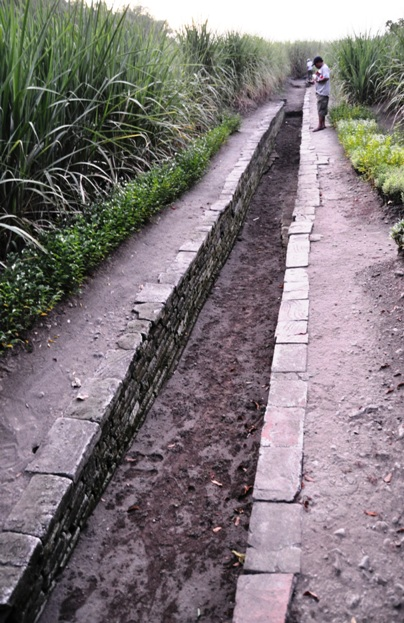
Ancient red-brick canal discovered in Trowulan. Majapahit had a well-developed irrigation infrastructure.

Some idea of the scale of the internal economy can be gathered from scattered data in inscriptions. The Canggu inscriptions dated 1358 mentions 78 ferry crossings in the country (mandala Java). Majapahit inscriptions mention a large number of occupational specialities, ranging from gold and silversmiths to drink vendors and butchers. Although many of these occupations had existed in earlier times, the proportion of the population earning an income from non-agrarian pursuits seems to have become even greater during the Majapahit era.

The great prosperity of Majapahit was probably due to two factors. Firstly, the northeast lowlands of Java were suitable for rice cultivation, and during Majapahit's prime numerous irrigation projects were undertaken, some with government assistance. Secondly, Majapahit's ports on the north coast were probably significant stations along the route to obtain the spices of Maluku, and as the spices passed through Java they would have provided an important source of income for Majapahit.

The Nagarakretagama states that the fame of the ruler of Wilwatikta (a synonym for Majapahit) attracted foreign merchants from far and wide, including Indians, Khmers, Siamese, and Chinese among others. While in the later period, Yingya Shenglan mentioned that large numbers of Chinese traders and Muslim merchants from the west (from Arabia and India, but mostly from Muslim states in Sumatra and the Malay Peninsula) are settling in Majapahit port cities, such as Tuban, Gresik and Hujung Galuh (Surabaya). A special tax was levied against some foreigners, possibly those who had taken up semi-permanent residence in Java and conducted some type of enterprise other than foreign trade. The Majapahit Empire had trading links with Chinese Ming dynasty, Đại Việt and Champa in today Vietnam, Cambodia, Siamese Ayutthayan, Burmese Martaban and the south Indian Vijayanagara Empire.

During the Majapahit era, almost all of the commodities from Asia were found in Java. This is because of extensive shipping by the Majapahit empire using various type of ships, particularly the jong, for trading to faraway places. Ma Huan (Zheng He's translator) who visited Java in 1413, stated that ports in Java were trading goods and offer services that were more numerous and more complete than other ports in Southeast Asia.

== Administration ==
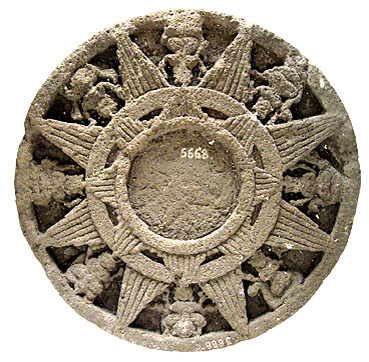
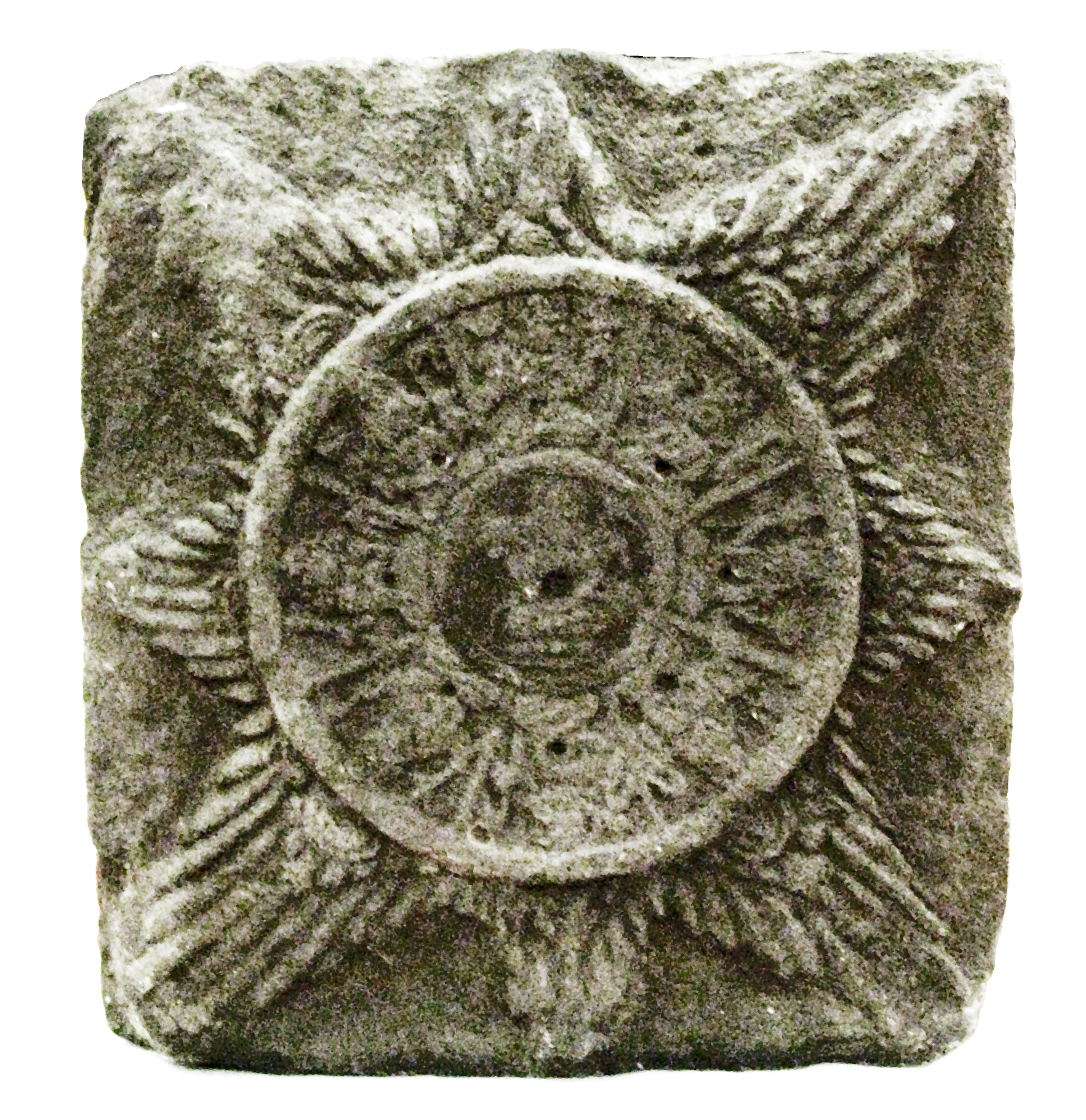
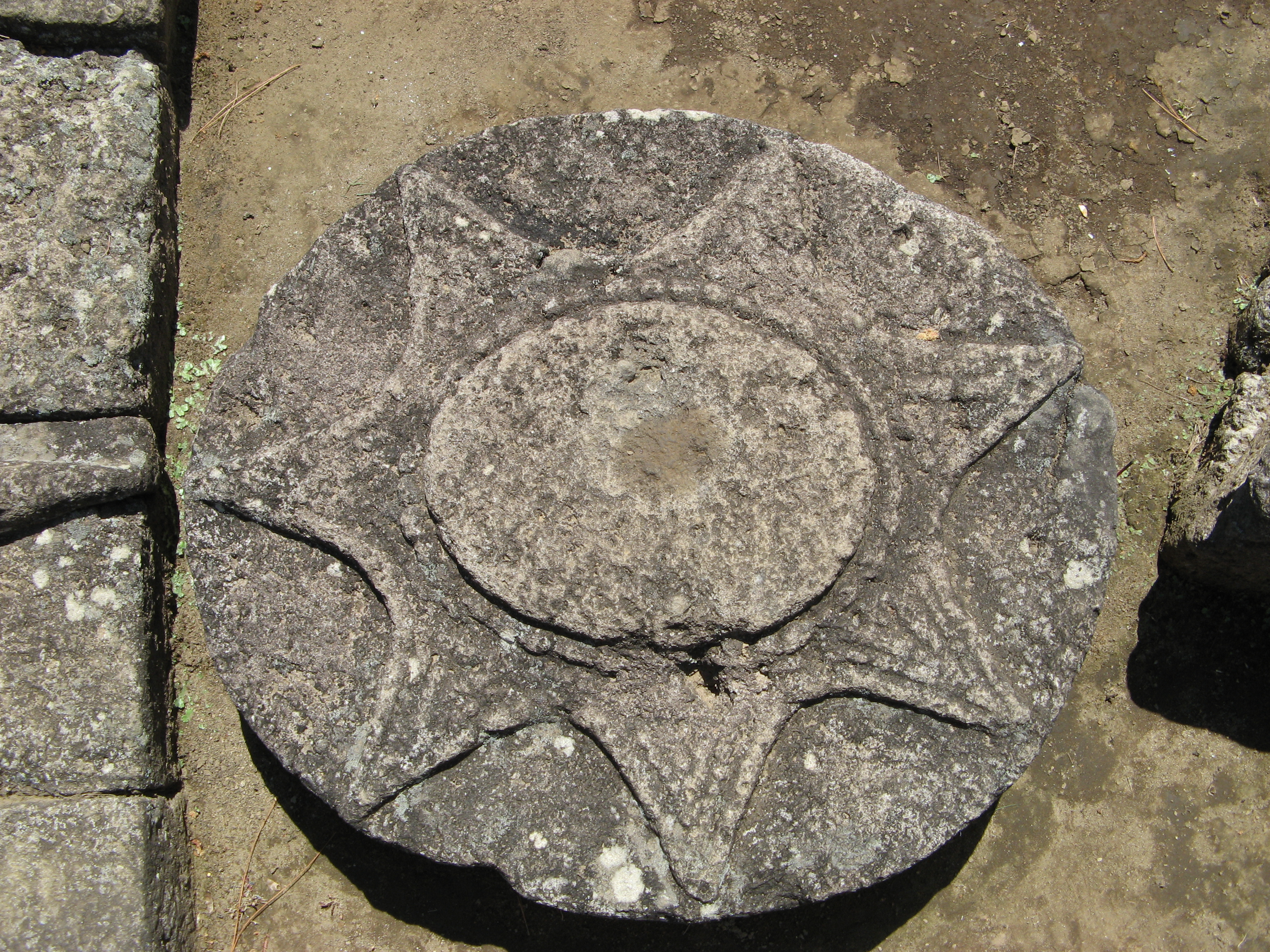
Three designs of Surya Majapahit, the sun emblem of the kingdom

During the reign of Hayam Wuruk, Majapahit employed a well-organised bureaucratic structure for administrative purposes. The hierarchy and structure relatively remain intact and unchanged throughout Majapahit history. The king is the paramount ruler, as the chakravartin he is considered the universal ruler and believed to be the living god on earth. The king holds the highest political authority and legitimacy.

=== Law and order ===
The law and order of Majapahit kingdom follows the regulations related to the criminal code of law which became the guidelines for people's lives at that time. This rule of law can be found in a manuscript called Kutaramanawa Dharmashastra or translated as "the Book of Religious Legislation". According to the historian Slamet Muljana's notes in the book Perundang-undangan Madjapahit (1967), there is no definite record regarding the time when this criminal law was drafted. However, based on some evidence, it can be concluded that this book of law written in old Javanese was originated from the Majapahit period during the reign of King Rajasanagara.

In Majapahit, the punishment for the crime of murder was death. According to the manuscript Kidung Sorandaka, it was said that Demung Sora, a minister of Majapahit court, was sentenced to death penalty under the Astadusta provisions for his crime on killing Mahisa Anabrang. Astadusta is a part of the Kutaramanawa Dharmashastra which regulates the punishment for murder. Overall, this criminal code consists of 19 sections that regulate various aspects of life. In addition to the punishment for the crime of murders which are summarised in the Astadusta section, there are also rules regarding buying and selling, debts, marriage, and pawnbroker. The punishments handed down included the death penalty, mutilation of the guilty body parts, fines and compensation. Additional penalties included ransom, confiscation, and money compensation for medication and drugs.

According to the Chinese description in Yingya Shenglan, when the one being stabbed was wounded and dead, the murderer will flee and hide for three days, then he will not lose his life. But if he was caught during the fight, he will instantly be stabbed to death (execution by stabbing). The country of Majapahit knows no caning for major or minor punishment. They tied the guilty men on his hands in the back with rattan rope and paraded them, and then stabbed the offender in the back where there is a floating rib which resulted in instant death. Judicial executions of this kind were frequent.

=== Bureaucracy officials ===
During his daily administration, the king is assisted by bureaucratic state officials that also included the close relatives of the kings that hold certain esteemed titles. The royal order or edict usually transmitted from the king to the high officials well to their subordinates. The officials in Majapahit courts are:

- Rakryan Mahamantri Katrini, usually reserved for the king's heir
- Rakryan Mantri ri Pakira-kiran, the board of ministers that conduct the daily administration
- Dharmmadhyaksa, the officials of laws, state laws as well as religious laws
- Dharmma-upapatti, the officials concerning religious affairs

Within the ministers of Rakryan Mantri ri Pakira-kiran there is the most important and the highest minister titled Rakryan Mapatih or Patih Hamangkubhumi. This position is analogous to prime minister, and together with the king, they determine the important state policies, including war or peace. Among the Dharmmadhyaksa officials, there is Dharmmadhyaksa ring Kasewan (State's highest Hindu Shivaist priest) and Dharmmadhyaksa ring Kasogatan (State's highest Buddhist priest), both are the authorities of the religious law of each dharmic faiths.

There is also the board of advisors which consists of the elders within the royal family called Bhattara Saptaprabhu. This council consists of seven influential elders – mostly directly related to the king. They are the Bhres (Duke or Duchess) acted as regional kings, the rulers of Majapahit provinces. This council congregates, offers advice, considered the king, and often formed an assembly to judge a certain important case in the court. Example of their office was, their sentence to temporarily suspend Mahamantri Gajah Mada, as a punishment since he was held responsible for the shamefully disastrous Bubat incident. The council also sentenced the execution of Raden Gajah (Narapati) for decapitating Bhre Wirabhumi in Regreg war.

=== Territorial hierarchy ===
Majapahit core realm and provinces (Mancanagara) in eastern and central parts of Java, including islands of Madura and Bali

Majapahit recognise the hierarchy classifications of lands within its realm:

1. Bhumi: the kingdom, ruled by the king
2. Nagara: the province, ruled by the rajya (governor), or natha (lord), or bhre (prince or duke)
3. Watek: the regency, administered by wiyasa,
4. Kuwu: the district, administered by akuwu,
5. Wanua: the village, administered by thani,
6. Kabuyutan: the hamlet or sanctuary place.

During its formation, Majapahit traditional realm only consists of lesser vassal kingdoms (provinces) in eastern and central Java. This region is ruled by provincial kings called Paduka Bhattara with the title Bhre, shortened form of Bhatara i (Bhatara of). This title is the highest position below the monarch and similar to duke or duchess. Usually, this position reserved for the close relatives of the king. They have to administer their provinces, collect taxes, send annual tributes to the capital, and manage the defences of their borders.

During the reign of Dyah Hayam Wuruk (formally King Rajasanagara; 1350–1389) there were 12 provinces of Majapahit, administered by king's close relatives:

Provinces	Titles	Rulers	Relation to the King
Kahuripan (or Janggala, today Sidoarjo)	Bhre Kahuripan	Tribhuwanatunggadewi	queen mother
Daha (former capital of Kediri)	Bhre Daha	Rajadewi Maharajasa	aunt and also mother-in-law
Tumapel (former capital of Singhasari)	Bhre Tumapel	Kertawardhana	father
Wengker (today Ponorogo)	Bhre Wengker	Wijayarajasa	uncle and also father-in-law
Matahun (today West Bojonegoro)	Bhre Matahun	Rajasawardhana	husband of the duchess of Lasem, king's cousin
Wirabhumi (Blambangan)	Bhre Wirabhumi	Bhre Wirabhumi (Note: Bhre Wirabhumi is actually the title: the Duke of Wirabhumi (Blambangan), the real name is unknown. He is referred to as Bhre Wirabhumi in Pararaton. He married Nagawardhani, the king's niece.)	son
Paguhan (today upstream of Serayu)	Bhre Paguhan	Singhawardhana	brother in-law
Kabalan (today East Bojonegoro)	Bhre Kabalan	Kusumawardhani (Note: Kusumawardhani (king's daughter) married Wikramawardhana (king's nephew), the couple became joint-heirs.)	daughter
Pawanuan	Bhre Pawanuan	Surawardhani	niece
Lasem (a coastal town in Central Java)	Bhre Lasem	Rajasaduhita Indudewi	cousin
Pajang (today Surakarta)	Bhre Pajang	Rajasaduhita Iswari	sister
Mataram (today Yogyakarta)	Bhre Mataram	Wikramawardhana	nephew and son-in-law

List of Majapahit provinces administered by the king's relatives based on Waringin Pitu inscription (1447) written during the reign of Dyah Kertawijaya (formally King Wijayaparakramawardhana).

Provinces	Titles	Rulers	Relation to the King
Kahuripan (or Janggala, today Sidoarjo)	Bhre Kahuripan	Rājasawardhana Dyah Wijayakumāra	son
Daha (former capital of Kediri)	Bhre Daha	Jayawardhanī Dyah Jayéswarī	wife
Tumapel (former capital of Singhasari)	Bhre Tumapel	Singhawikramawardhana Dyah Suraprabhāwa	son
Wengker (today Ponorogo)	Bhre Wengker	Girīsawardhana Dyah Sūryawikrama	son
Matahun (today West Bojonegoro)	Bhre Matahun	Wijayaparākrama Dyah Samarawijaya	grandson
Wirabhumi (Blambangan)	Bhre Wirabhumi	Rājasawardhanendudewī Dyah Puréswari	granddaughter-in-law
Jagaraga	Bhre Jagaraga	Wijayendudewī Dyah Wijayaduhitā	niece
Tanjungpura	Bhre Tanjungpura	Manggalawardhanī Dyah Suraghārinī	daughter-in-law
Kabalan (today East Bojonegoro)	Bhre Kabalan	Mahāmisī Dyah Sāwitrī	daughter-in-law
Kembang Jenar	Bhre Kembang Jenar	Rājānandanéswarī Dyah Sudharminī	niece-in-law
Singhapura	Bhre Singhapura	Rājāsawardhanadewī Dyah Srīpurā	daughter-in-law
Pajang (today Surakarta)	Bhre Pajang	Dyah Suréswari	niece
Keling	Bhre Keling	Girindrawardhana Dyah Wijayakarana	grandson
Kalinggapura	Bhre Kalinggapura	Kalamawarnadewī Dyah Sudāyitā	granddaughter-in-law

=== Territorial division ===
When Majapahit entered the thalassocracy imperial phase during the administration of Gajah Mada, several overseas vassal states were included within the Majapahit sphere of influence, as a result, the new larger territorial concept was defined:

The extent of Majapahit's influence under Hayam Wuruk in 1365 according to Nagarakretagama

- Negara Agung, or the Grand State, the core kingdom. The traditional or initial area of Majapahit during its formation before entering the imperial phase. This includes the capital city and the surrounding areas where the king effectively exercises his government. The area in and around royal capital of Trowulan, the port of Canggu and sections of Brantas River valley near the capital, also mountainous areas south and southeast of the capital, all the way to Pananggungan and Arjuno-Welirang peaks, are the core realm of the kingdom. The Brantas river valley corridor, connecting Majapahit Trowulan area to Canggu and estuarine areas in Kahuripan (Sidoarjo) and Hujung Galuh port (Surabaya) are considered parts of Negara Agung.
- Mancanegara, areas surrounding Negara Agung – traditionally refer to Majapahit provinces in East and Central Java. This area covered the eastern half of Java, with all its provinces ruled by the Bhres (dukes), the king's close relatives. These areas are directly influenced by Javanese Majapahit court culture and obliged to pay annual tributes. These areas usually possess their rulers that might be directly related, foster an alliance or intermarried with the Majapahit royal family. Majapahit stationed their officials and officers in these places and regulate their foreign trade activities and collect taxes, yet they enjoyed substantial internal autonomy. This includes the rest of Java island, Madura and Bali. However, in the later period, overseas provinces which have developed culture reflected or comparable to those of Java, or possess significant trading importance, are also considered mancanegara. Either the province has its own native rulers subject (vassal) to the king, or a regent appointed and sent by the king to rule the region. This realm includes Dharmasraya, Pagaruyung, Lampung and Palembang in Sumatra.
- Nusantara, areas which do not reflect Javanese culture, but are included as colonies and they had to pay an annual tribute. They had their native polity intact, enjoyed substantial autonomy and internal freedom, and Majapahit did not necessarily station their officials or military officers here; however, any challenges on Majapahit oversight might draw a severe response. These areas such as the vassal kingdoms and colonies in the Malay Peninsula, Borneo, Lesser Sunda Islands, Sulawesi and Maluku.

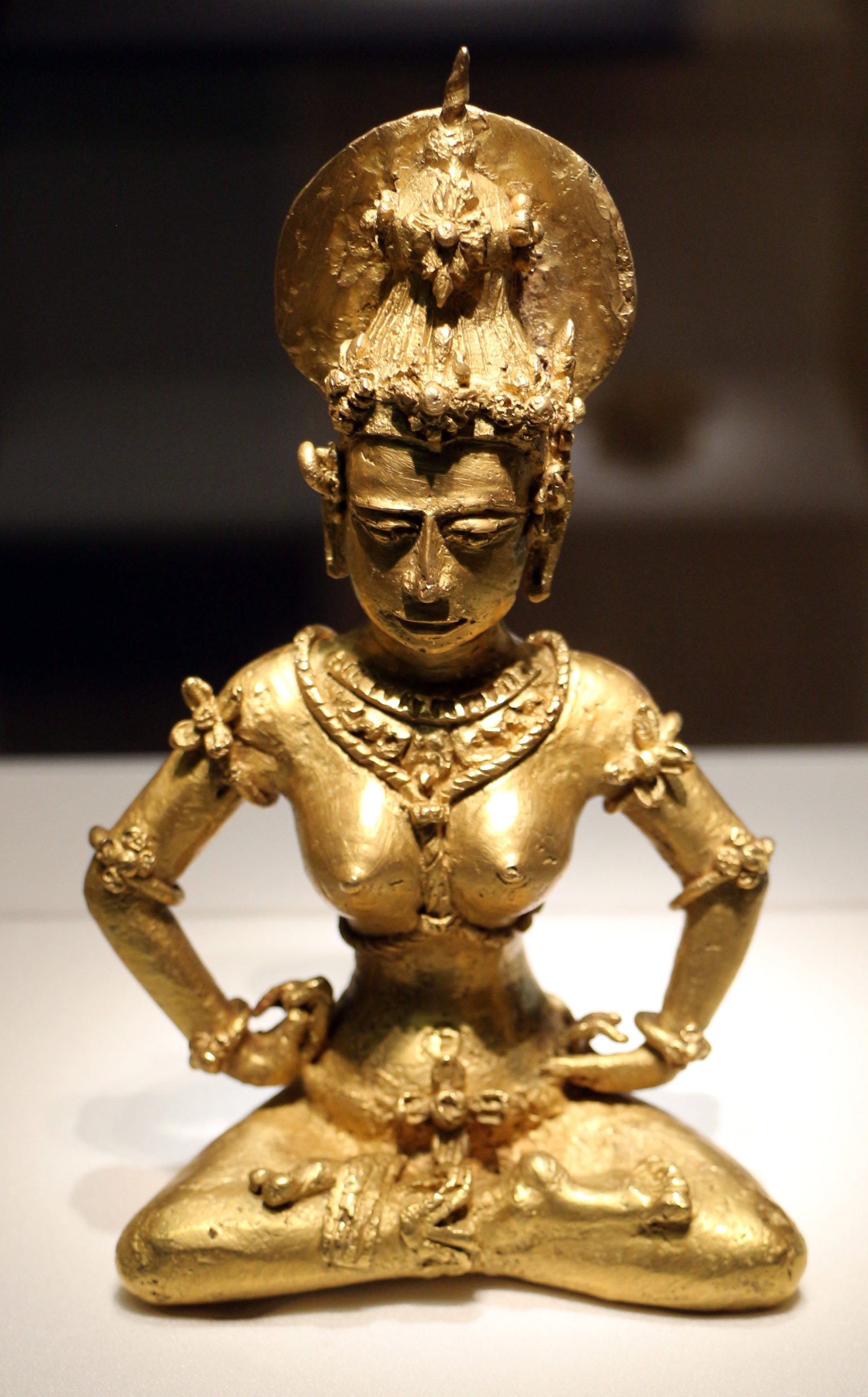
A 1.79 kilogram, 21-karat Majapahit period gold image discovered in Agusan, Philippines, copied Nganjuk bronze images of the early Majapahit period, signify Majapahit cultural influence on southern Philippines.

Nagarakretagama mentioned more than 80 places in the archipelago described as the vassal states. In Canto 13, several lands on Sumatra are mentioned, and some possibly correspond to contemporary areas: Jambi, Palembang, Teba (either Tebo in Jambi or Toba areas by Lake Toba), and Dharmasraya. Also mentioned are Kandis, Kahwas, Minangkabau, Siak, Rokan, Kampar and Pane, Kampe, Haru (coastal North Sumatra, today around Medan) and Mandailing. Tamiyang (Aceh Tamiang Regency), negara Perlak (Peureulak) and Padang Lawas, are noted in the west, together with Samudra (Samudra Pasai) and Lamuri, Batan (Bintan), Lampung, and Barus. Also listed are the states of Tanjungnegara (believed to be on Borneo): Kapuas Katingan, Sampit, Kota Lingga, Kotawaringin, Sambas, and Lawas.

In Nagarakretagama Canto 14 more lands are noted: Kadandangan, Landa, Samadang, Tirem, Sedu (Sibu in Sarawak), Barune (Brunei), Kalka, Saludung (Serudong River in Sabah), Solot (Sulu), Pasir, Barito, Sawaku, Tabalung, and Tanjung Kutei. In Hujung Medini (Malay Peninsula), Pahang is mentioned first. Next Langkasuka, Saimwang, Kelantan and Trengganu, Johor, Paka, Muar, Dungun, Tumasik (Temasek, where Singapore is today), Kelang (Klang Valley) and Kedah, Jerai (Gunung Jerai), Kanjapiniran, all are united.

Also in Canto 14 are territories east of Java: Badahulu and Lo Gajah (part of today's Bali). Gurun and Sukun, Taliwang, Sapi (Sape town, east end of Sumbawa island, by the Sape Strait) and Dompo, Sang Hyang Api, Bima. Sheran and Hutan Kadali (Buru island). Gurun island, and Lombok Merah. Together with prosperous Sasak (central, north and east Lombok) are already ruled. Bantayan with Luwu. Further east are Udamakatraya (Sangir and Talaud). Also mentioned are Makassar, Buton, Banggai, Kunir, Galiao with Selayar, Sumba, Solot, Muar. Also Wanda(n) (Banda island), Ambon or Maluku islands, Kai Islands, Wanin (Onin Peninsula, today Fakfak Regency, West Papua), Sran, Timor and other islands.

Asia in the early 14th century

The true nature of Majapahit suzerainty is still a subject of study and even has sparked controversy. Nagarakretagama describes Majapahit as the centre of a huge mandala consists of 98 tributaries stretching from Sumatra to New Guinea. Some scholars have discounted this claim as merely a sphere of limited influence, or even just a statement of geographical knowledge.

Nevertheless, the Javanese overseas prestige and influence during the lifetime of Hayam Wuruk was undoubtedly considerable. Majapahit fleets must have periodically visited many places in the archipelago to acquire formal submission, or the splendour of Majapahit court might have attracted regional rulers to send a tribute, without any intention to submit to Majapahit's order.

All of those three categories – the Negara Agung, Mancanegara and Nusantara, were within the sphere of influence of the Majapahit empire.

The model of political formations and power diffusion from its core in the Majapahit capital city that radiates through its overseas possessions was later identified by historians as "mandala" model. The term mandala derived from Sanskrit "circle" to explain the typical ancient Southeast Asian polity that was defined by its centre rather than its boundaries, and it could be composed of numerous other tributary polities without undergoing administrative integration. The territories belongs within Majapahit Mandala sphere of influence were those categorised as Mancanegara and Nusantara. These areas usually have their indigenous rulers, enjoy substantial autonomy and have their political institution intact without further integration into Majapahit administration. The same mandala model also applied to previous empires; Srivijaya and Angkor, and also Majapahit's neighbouring mandalas; Ayutthaya and Champa.

Foreign or overseas territories are mentioned in Nagarakretagama canto 15 stanza 1. These territories include Syangka (Siam), Ayodyapura (Ayutthaya), Dharmmanagari (Ligor), Marutma (Martaban or Mergui), Rajapura (Rajpuri in the south of Siam), Singhanagari (Singhapuri on the branch of the river Menam), Campa, and Kamboja (Cambodia). The relationship between Majapahit and these territories is called kachaya, which means "to be exposed to light". It is interpreted as protected or sheltered. The term "protected area" in the modern state system is referred to as a protectorate.

In addition, in canto 83 stanza 4 and 93 stanza 1 are mentioned the places that became the origin of merchants and scholars. The regions are Jambudwipa (India), Cina, Karnataka (South India), and Goda (Gauḍa). What is different is Yawana (Arabs, see explanation), as mentioned anyat i yawana mitreka satata (different is Yawana who is a permanent ally).

The question whether Majapahit is considered an empire or not is actually depends on the definition of the word and concept of "empire" itself. Majapahit did not performed direct administration of its overseas possessions, they did not maintain permanent military occupation, and did not imposes its political and cultural norms over a wide area; thus it is not sufficiently considered an empire in a traditional sense. However, if being an empire means the projection of military power at will, formal acknowledgement of overlordship by vassals, and the regular tribute delivery to the capital, then Java's relationship to the rest of archipelagic realm can well be considered an imperial one; thus Majapahit can be considered an empire.

In later period, Majapahit's hold on its overseas possessions began to wane. According to Waringin Pitu inscription (dated 1447) it was mentioned that Majapahit's core realm was consisted of 14 provinces, that administrated by the ruler titled Bhre. The provinces written in the inscription are:

- Daha (former capital of Kediri)
- Jagaraga
- Kabalan
- Kahuripan (or Janggala, modern Surabaya)
- Keling
- Kelinggapura
- Kembang Jenar
- Matahun (today Bojonegoro)
- Pajang (today Surakarta)
- Singhapura
- Tanjungpura
- Tumapel (former capital of Singhasari)
- Wengker (today Ponorogo)
- Wirabhumi (today Blambangan)

The inscription, however, did not mention Majapahit's vassals in other areas around the period, such as:

- Indragiri in Sumatra and Siantan (now in Pontianak in the west coast of Borneo), which according to the Malay Annals, were given as a dowry to Malacca for the marriage of a Majapahit princess and Mansur Shah sometime during his reign. Sultan Mansur Shah reigned from 1459 to 1477, which implies that Indragiri and Siantan were both still under Majapahit's control in 1447.
- Jambi and Palembang, which only ceased to be under Majapahit suzerainty when seized by Demak.
- And Bali, which were known to be the last stronghold of the Hindu-Javanese civilization during Majapahit's downfall.

The book Suma Oriental by Tomé Pires written in 1515 records that Java (Majapahit) ruled as far as the Moluccas on the east side and most of the west side of the archipelago; and almost the whole island of Sumatra was under its control and also controlled all the islands known to the Javanese. Majapahit ruled over these for a long time until about a hundred years earlier, when its power began to wane until it became similar to that during the year of Pires' visit to Java (March–June 1513).

== Military ==
The army of Majapahit was divided into 2 main types, namely prajurit (professional soldier) and levy taken up from peasants. The main weapon used was the spear. Initially, cavalry only existed in limited numbers. They were mainly used for scouting and patrol, and were most likely armed with lances. After the Mongol invasion, the use of horses became more widespread in Java, especially for war. Chariots are used for transporting soldiers to the battlefield and were "parked" before the battle. Some chariots were indeed used in battle, for example, the prime minister Nambi rode a chariot and served as an archer in the Rangga Lawe rebellion (1295 CE). Gajah Mada also rode in a chariot when attacking Sundanese troops in the Bubat battle (1357). Chariots were carved at the Penataran Temple, seemingly modeled from the real world. War elephants were used mainly for transport, or as a mount for nobility and soldiers of higher rank.

Majapahit had 30,000 full-time professional troops, whose soldiers and commanders were paid in gold. This shows the existence of a standing army, an achievement that only a handful of Southeast Asian empires could hope to achieve. In addition to these professional soldiers, Majapahit was strengthened by troops from subordinate countries and regional leaders. From the records of Suma Oriental and Malay Annals, the total number of Majapahit troops could reach 200,000 people. The Majapahit troops were multiethnic, similar to the Yogyakarta Sultanate military which had Bugis and Dhaeng (Makassar) troops. As noted in Hikayat Raja-Raja Pasai:

So the two parties returned to their respective places. That was how the war went on every day, for about three months, the war was unrelenting, because the Javanese kingdom also received help from foreign lands.

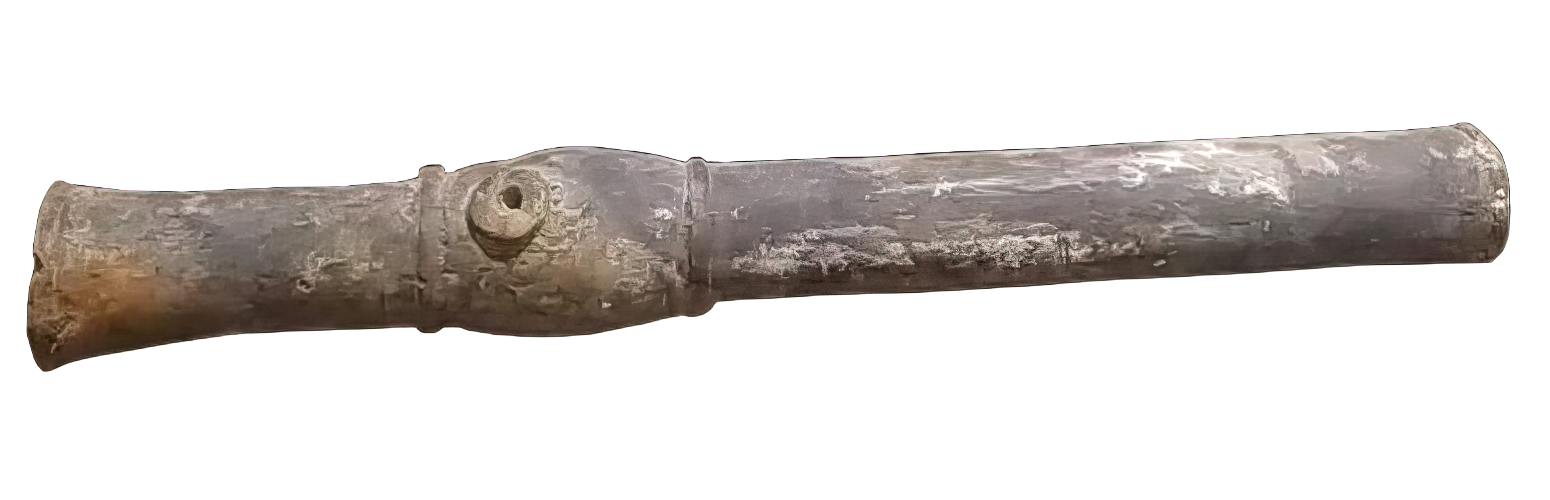
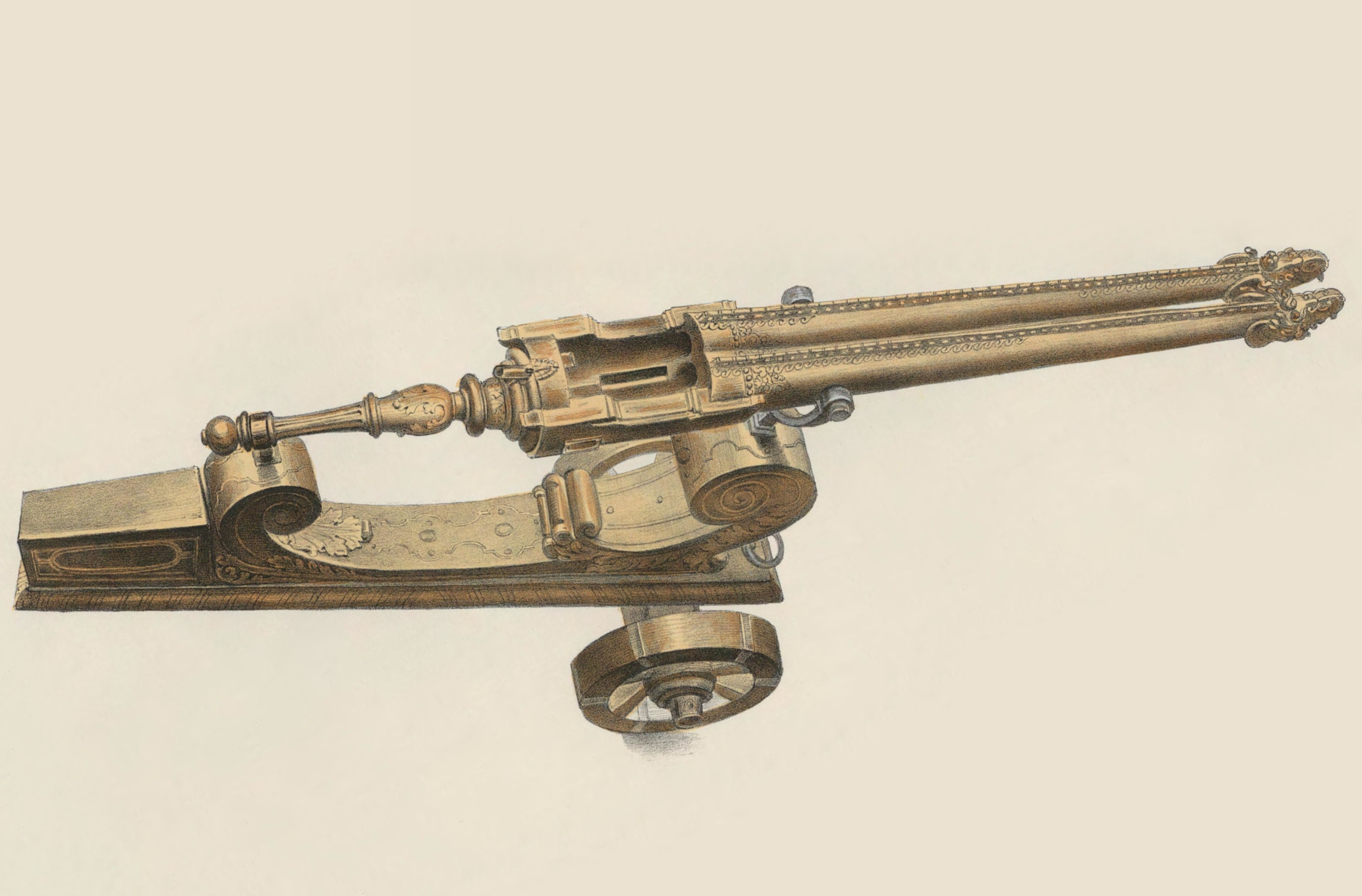
Gunpowder weapons used by Majapahit:
- Bronze hand cannon-type cetbang, found in the Brantas river, Jombang
- A double-barrelled cetbang on a carriage, with swivel yoke, c. 1522. The mouth of the cannon is in the shape of Javanese Nāga.

Gunpowder technology entered Java in the Mongol invasion of Java (1293 A.D.). Majapahit under Mahapatih (prime minister) Gajah Mada utilized gunpowder technology obtained from the Yuan dynasty for use in the naval fleet. During the following years, the Majapahit army have begun producing cannons known as cetbang. Early cetbang (also called eastern-style cetbang) resembled Chinese cannons and hand cannons. Eastern-style cetbangs were mostly made of bronze and were front-loaded cannons. It fires arrow-like projectiles, but round bullets and co-viative projectiles (Note: A type of scatter bullet – when shot it spews fire, splinters and bullets, and can also be arrows. The characteristic of this projectile is that the bullet does not cover the entire bore of the barrel.) can also be used. These arrows can be solid-tipped without explosives, or with explosives and incendiary materials placed behind the tip. Near the rear, there is a combustion chamber or room, which refers to the bulging part near the rear of the gun, where the gunpowder is placed. The cetbang is mounted on a fixed mount, or as a hand cannon mounted on the end of a pole. There is a tube-like section on the back of the cannon. In the hand cannon-type cetbang, this tube is used as a socket for a pole.

Because of the close maritime relations of the Nusantara archipelago with the territory of west India, after 1460 new types of gunpowder weapons entered the archipelago through Arab intermediaries. This weapon seems to be cannon and gun of Ottoman tradition, for example the prangi, which is a breech-loading swivel gun. It resulted in a new type of cetbang, called "western-style cetbang". It can be mounted as a fixed or swivel gun, small-sized ones can be easily installed on small vessels. In naval combat, this gun is used as an anti-personnel weapon, not anti-ship. In this age, even to the 17th century, Nusantaran soldiers fought on a platform called balai and performed boarding actions. Loaded with scatter shots (grapeshot, case shot, or nails and stones) and fired at close range, the cetbang would have been effective at this type of fighting.

Majapahit had elite troops called Bhayangkara. The main task of these troops is for protecting the king and nobilities, but they may also be deployed to the battlefield if required. The Hikayat Banjar noted the Bhayangkara equipments in the Majapahit palace:

Maka kaluar dangan parhiasannya orang barbaju-rantai ampat puluh sarta padangnya barkupiah taranggos sakhlat merah, orang mambawa astenggar ampat puluh, orang mambawa parisai sarta padangnya ampat puluh, orang mambawa dadap sarta sodoknya sapuluh, orang mambawa panah sarta anaknya sapuluh, yang mambawa tumbak parampukan barsulam amas ampat puluh, yang mambawa tameng Bali bartulis air mas ampat puluh.
So came out with their ornaments men with chain mail numbered forty alongside their swords and red kopiah [skull cap], men carrying astengger [arquebus] numbered forty, men carrying shield and swords numbered forty, men carrying dadap [a type of shield] (Note: Dadap has 2 meanings: In Indonesian language, it refers to round shield made of leather or rattan, while in old Javanese it refers to a long, narrow parrying shield. Dadap in Java seems to refer to a long shield which is quite heavy, probably with protruding ends.) and sodok [broad-bladed spear-like weapon] (Note: For the meaning of sodok, see) numbered ten, men carrying bows and arrows numbered ten, (men) who carried parampukan spears (Note: Rampuk likely derived from Old Javanese rampog and ngrampog, which means "to attack in great numbers". Old Javanese watang parampogan means a pike used in the parampogan, that is, tiger spearing (rampokan macan).) embroidered with gold numbered forty, (men) who carried Balinese shields with golden water engraving numbered forty.
– Hikayat Banjar, 6.3

Cropped portion of China Sea in the Miller atlas, showing six and three-masted jong

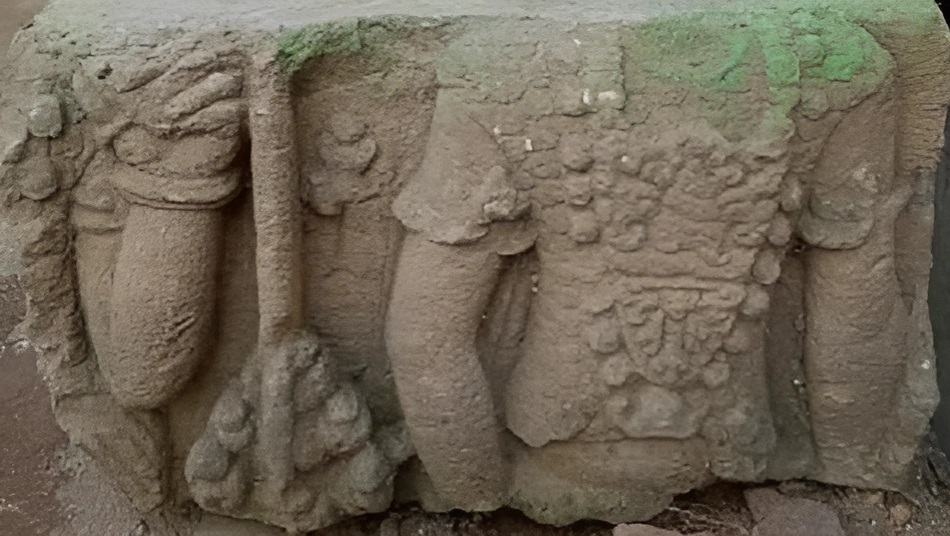
A relief showing scale armor, probably from Penataran temple complex

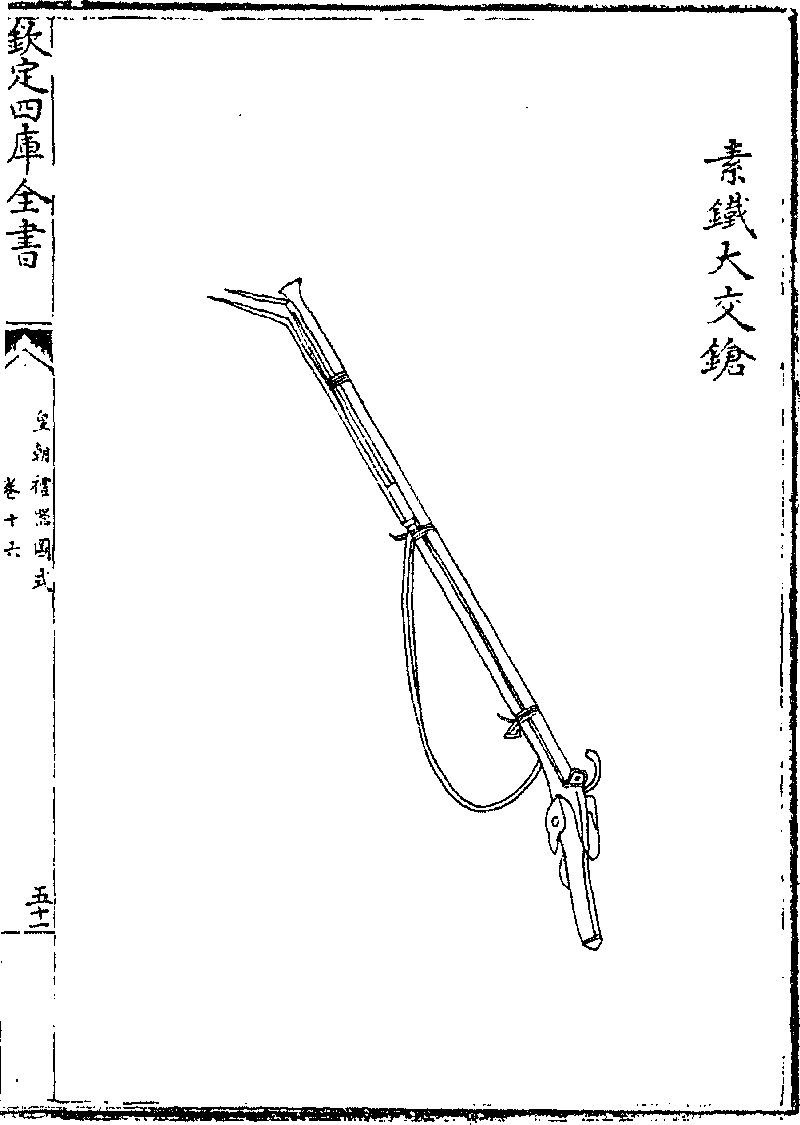
This Jiaozhi arquebus is similar to Java arquebus.

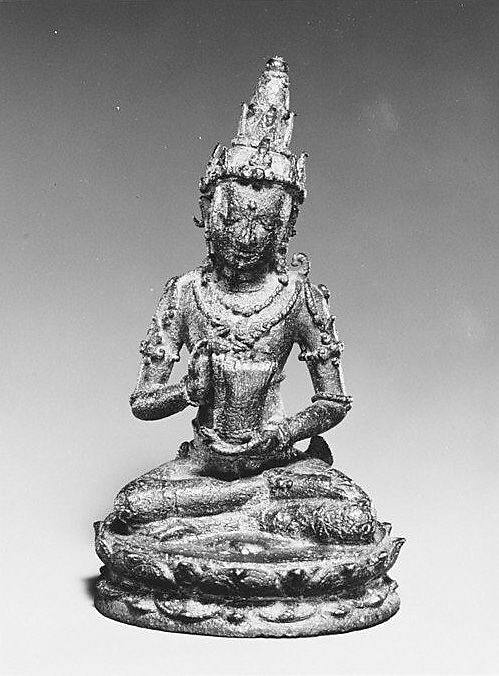
Deity holding a cuirass, from earlier, 10–11th century, Nganjuk, East Java

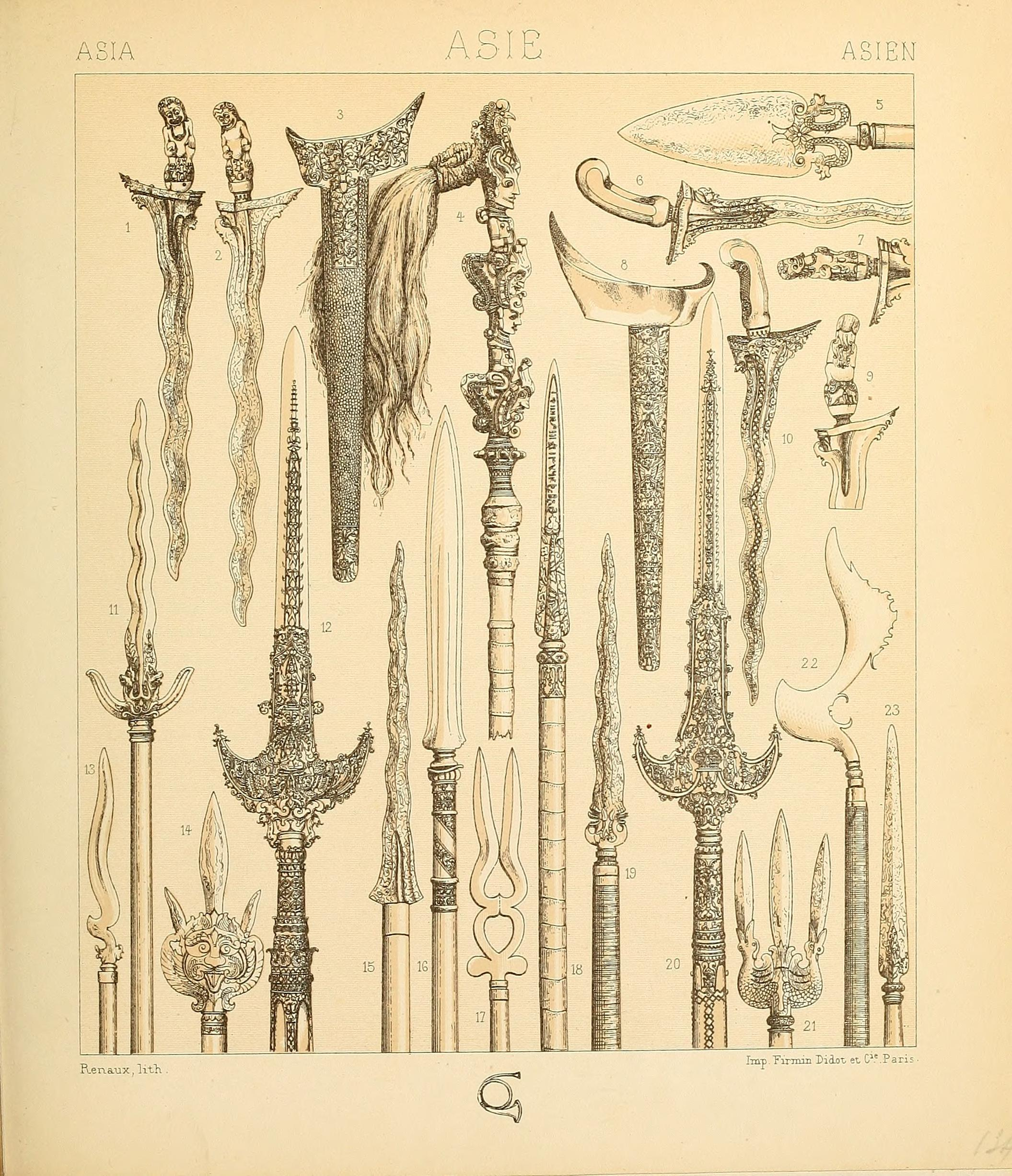
Various keris and pole weapons of Java

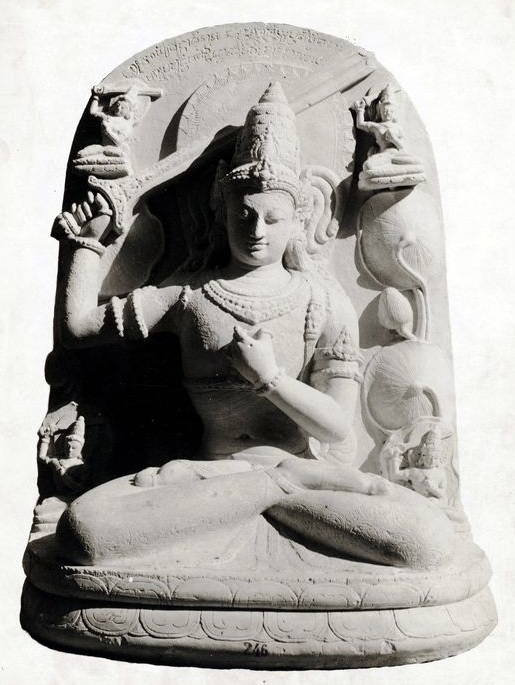
Bodhisattva Manjusri wielding a sword, from Candi Jago, 1343

Military forces in various parts of Southeast Asia were lightly armored. As was common in Southeast Asia, most of the Javanese forces were composed of temporarily conscripted commoners (levy) led by the warrior and noble castes. The "peasant army" was usually bare-chested wearing a sarung, armed with spear, short sword, or bow and arrows. The richer (higher rank) soldiers wore armor called kawaca. (Note: Kawaca has two meaning. The first one is a shirt or dress shirt (Indonesian: kemeja) worn by clergy, the other means armor. See) Irawan Djoko Nugroho argues that it may be shaped like a long tube and was made of cast copper. In contrast, the regular infantry (professional soldiers, not the levy) wore a scale armor called siping-siping. There is also a kind of steel helmet called rukuh. Other kinds of armor used in Majapahit-era Java was waju rante (chain mail armor) and karambalangan (a layer of metal worn in front of the chest). In Kidung Sunda canto 2 stanza 85 it is explained that the mantris (ministers or officers) of Gajah Mada wore armor in the form of chain mail or breastplate with gold decoration and dressed in yellow attire, while Kidung Sundayana canto 1 stanza 95 mentioned that Gajah Mada wore golden embossed karambalangan, armed with gold-layered spear, and with a shield full of diamond decoration.

Majapahit also pioneered the use of firearms in the archipelago. Even though the knowledge of making gunpowder-based weapons has been known after the failed Mongol invasion of Java, and the predecessor of firearms, the pole gun (bedil tombak) was recorded by Ma Huan in his Yingya Shenlan as being used by the Javanese for marriage ceremony in 1413, the knowledge of making "true" firearms came much later, after the middle of the 15th century. It was brought by the Islamic nations of West Asia, most probably the Arabs. The precise year of introduction is unknown, but it may be safely concluded to be no earlier than 1460.

Xingcha Shenglan (星槎勝覽) written by Fei Xin c. 1436 stated that Java (Majapahit) is equipped with armored soldiers and equipment, and it is the center of the Eastern people. Haiguo Guangji (海国广记) and Shuyu zhouzi lu (殊域周咨錄) recorded that Java is vast and densely populated, and their armored soldiers and hand cannons (火銃—huǒ chòng) dominated the Eastern Seas.

Tomé Pires' 1513 account tells the army of Gusti Pati (Patih Udara), viceroy of Batara Vojyaya (probably Brawijaya or Ranawijaya), numbered 200,000 men, 2,000 of which are horsemen and 4,000 musketeers. Duarte Barbosa ca. 1514 recorded that the inhabitants of Java are great masters in casting artillery and very good artillerymen. They make many one-pounder cannons (cetbang or rentaka), long muskets, spingarde (arquebus), schioppi (hand cannon), Greek fire, guns (cannons), and other fire-works. Every place is considered excellent in casting artillery, and in the knowledge of using it.

Reliefs at the main temple of the Penataran temple complex, 1269 Śaka or 1347 CE.

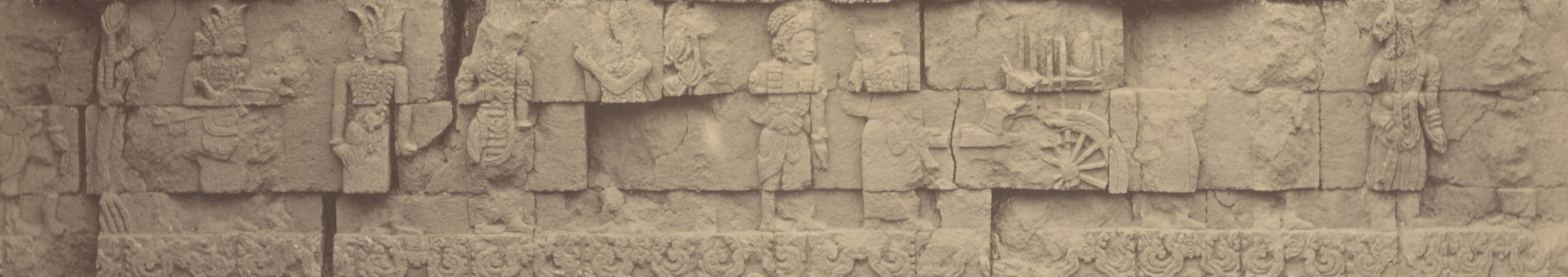
Worn-out reliefs in Candi Penataran, showing an armored horse rider, armored warriors, and a chariot.

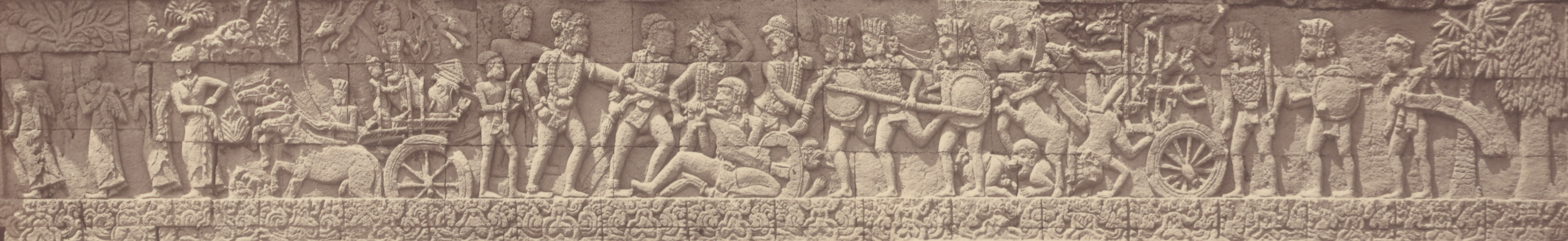
Battle scene from the relief of the Krishnayana story.

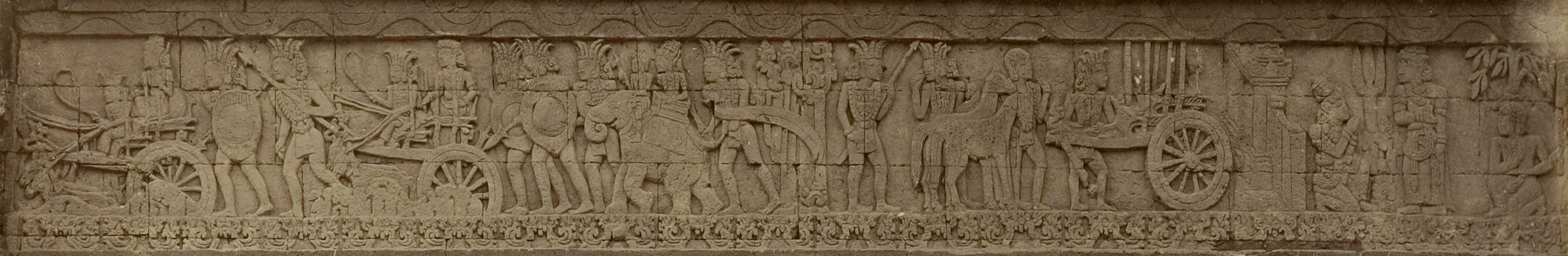
Troops consisting of war chariots, spearmen, and a war elephant.

The first true cavalry (organized units of cooperative horsemen) in Java may have appeared during the 12th century CE. The old Javanese manuscript kakawin Bhomāntaka mentioned early Javanese horse lore and horsemanship. The manuscript may reflect the conflict (allegorically) between the newly formed Javanese cavalry and the well-established elite infantry of Javanese armies. In the 14th century CE, Java became an important horse breeder and the island was even listed among horse suppliers to China. During the Majapahit period, the quantity and quality of Javanese horse breeds steadily grew. In 1513 CE Tomé Pires praised the highly decorated horses of Javanese nobility, complemented by gold-studded stirrups and lavishly decorated saddles that were "not found anywhere else in the world". The Sumbawa pony seems to have been derived from the Javanese domesticated horse introduced by Majapahit in the 14th century CE.

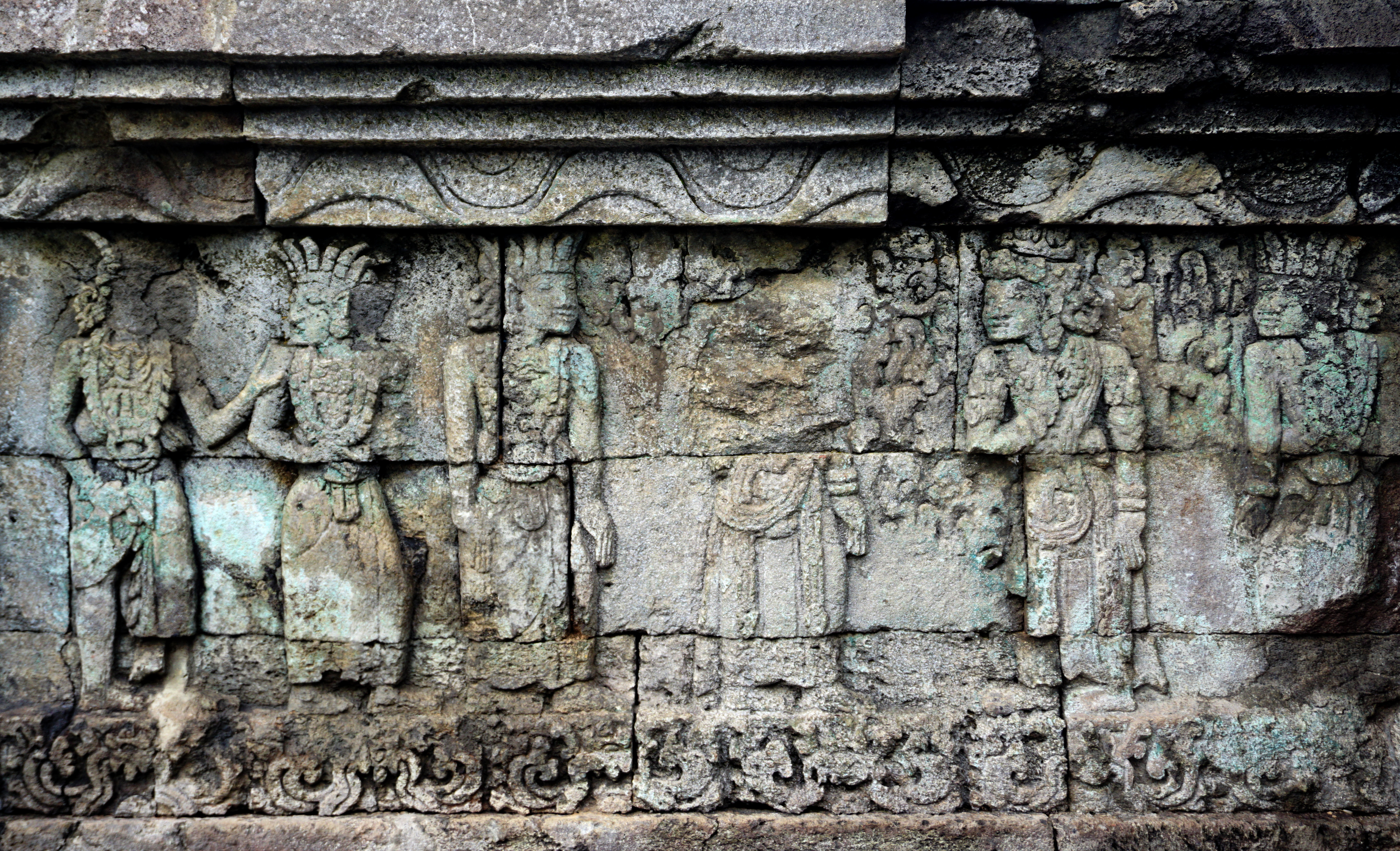
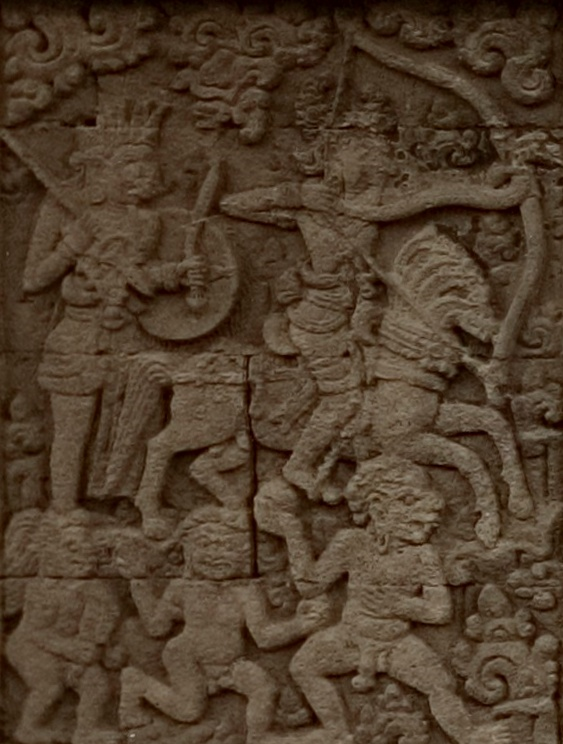
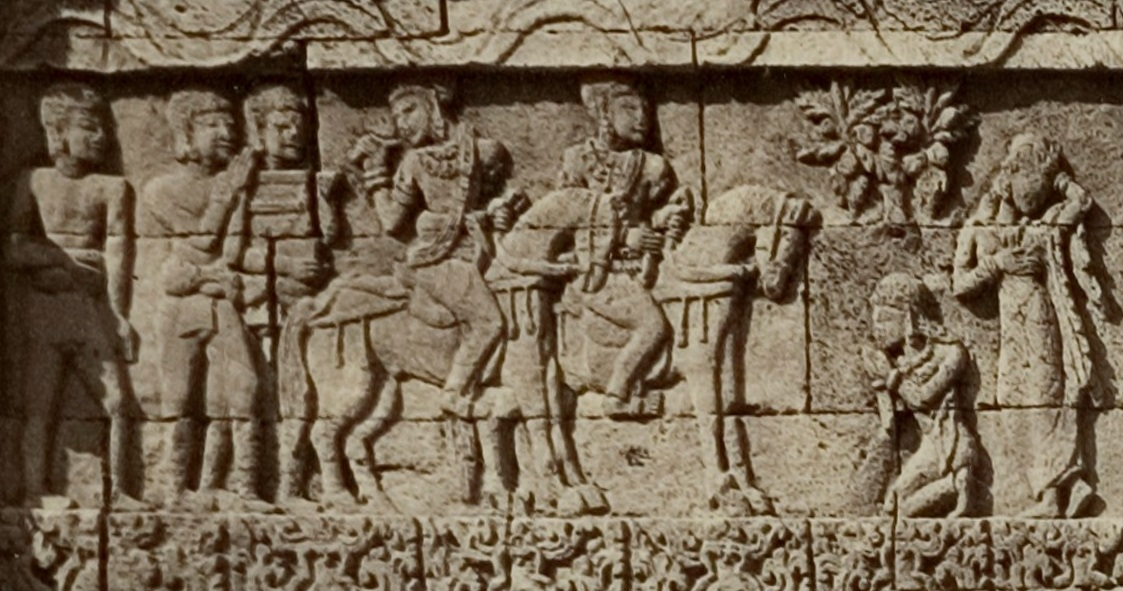
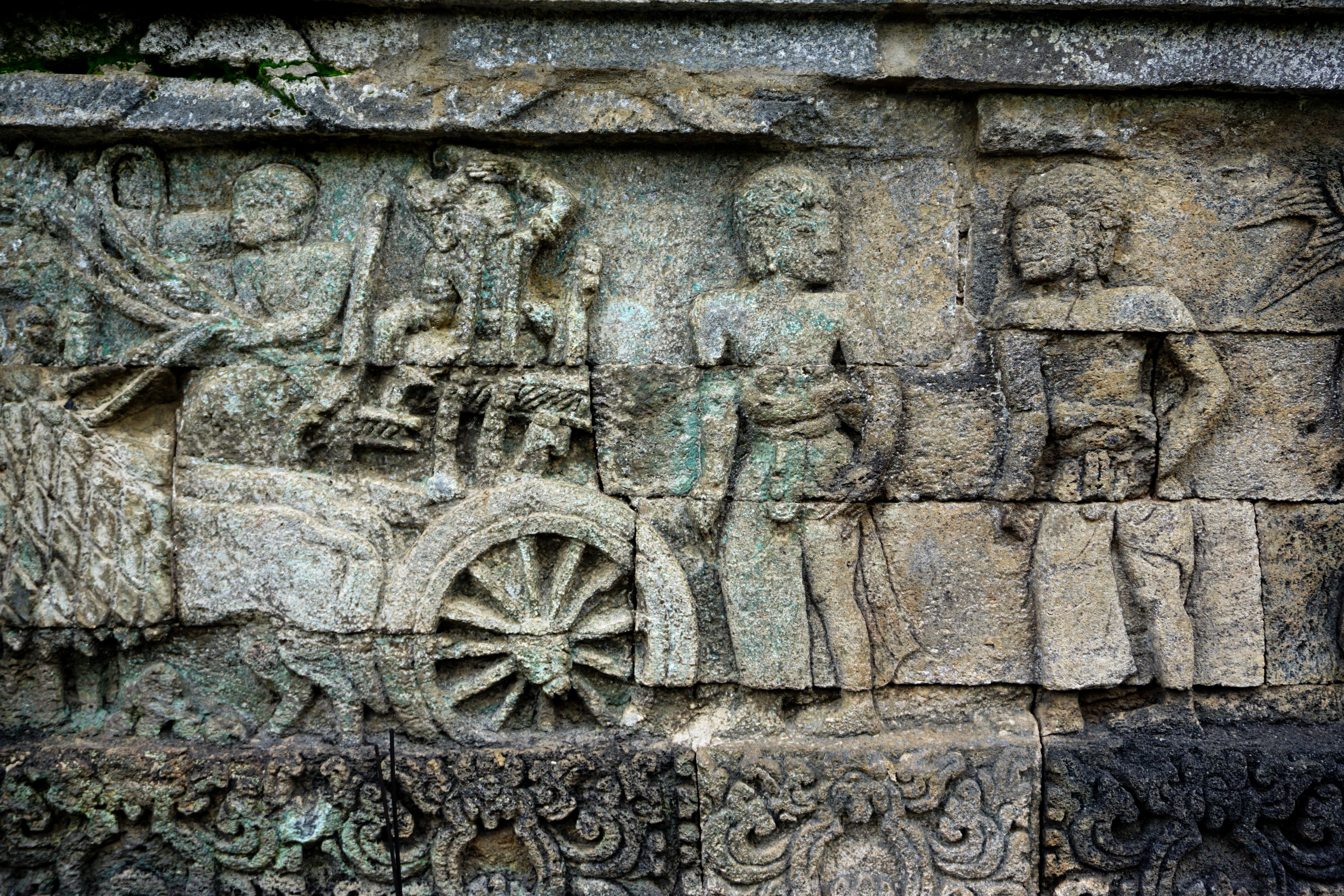
Soldiers and equipments depicted in the main temple of Penataran

Majapahit had a naval troops that was distinguished from ground troop units, which was called wwang jaladhi. Naval troops get preferential treatment in terms of facilities. Majapahit navy personnel were large, as noted Nagarakretagama canto 16 stanza 5:

irika tang anyabhumi sakhahemban ing Yawapuri, (Then 'Anyabhumi' [other lands] everywhere were all united in the Javanese kingdom,)

amateh i sajna sang nrpati khapwa satya ring ulah, (obey every command of the king. All are faithful in attitude,)

pituwi sing ajñalanghyana dinon wiśirnna sahana, (even though there were treaty violators, they were attacked by expeditionary forces and were all destroyed,)

tekap ikang watek jaladhi mantry aneka suyaśa. (by the activity of the group of 'mantri jaladhi' [naval officers] who were numerous, glorious.)

The main warship of the Majapahit navy was the jong. The jongs were large transport ships that could carry 100–2000 tons of cargo and 50–1000 people. They are about 26.36–80.51 m in LOD (deck length) and 28.99–88.56 m in LOA (overall length). A jong from 1420 nearly crossed the Atlantic Ocean. A type of large nine-decked jong that was recorded in Kidung Panji Wijayakrama-Rangga Lawe (c. 1334) was called jong sasangawangunan, it carried 1000 fighting men with red sails. The exact number of jongs fielded by Majapahit is unknown, but the largest number of jongs deployed in an expedition was about 400 jongs when Majapahit attacked Pasai. The average jong used by Majapahit would be about 76.18–79.81 m LOA, carrying 600–700 men, with 1200–1400 tons deadweight. Before the Battle of Bubat in 1357, the Sunda king and the royal family arrived in Majapahit after sailing across the Java Sea in a fleet of 200 large ships and 2000 smaller vessels. The royal family boarded a nine-decked hybrid Sino-Southeast Asian junk (Old Javanese: Jong sasanga wangunan ring Tatarnagari tiniru). This hybrid junk incorporated Chinese techniques, such as using iron nails alongside wooden dowels, the construction of watertight bulkheads, and the addition of a central rudder. Besides that, other types of vessels used by Majapahit navy are malangbang, kelulus, pelang, jongkong, cerucuh, and tongkang. In the 16th century lancaran and penjajap are also used. Modern depictions of the Majapahit navy often depict outrigger ships, in reality, these ships were from 8th-century Borobudur ship bas relief. Research by Nugroho concluded that the main vessels used by Majapahit did not use outriggers, and using Borobudur engraving as the basis for reconstructing the Majapahit ship is wrong and misleading.

== Explorations and navigation ==
During the Majapahit era, Nusantaran exploration reached its greatest accomplishment. Ludovico di Varthema (1470–1517), in his book Itinerario de Ludouico de Varthema Bolognese stated that the Southern Javanese people sailed to "far Southern lands" up to the point they arrived at an island where a day only lasted four hours long and was "colder than in any part of the world". Modern studies have determined that such place is located at least 900 nautical miles (1666 km) south of the southernmost point of Tasmania.

The Javanese people, like other Austronesian ethnicities, use a solid navigation system: Orientation at sea is carried out using a variety of different natural signs, and by using a very distinctive astronomy technique called "star path navigation". Basically, the navigators determine the bow of the ship to the islands that are recognized by using the position of rising and setting of certain stars above the horizon. In the Majapahit era, compasses and magnets were used, and cartography (mapping science) was developed. In 1293 CE Raden Wijaya presented a map and census record to the Yuan Mongol invader, suggesting that mapmaking has been a formal part of governmental affairs in Java. The use of maps full of longitudinal and transverse lines, rhumb lines, and direct route lines traveled by ships were recorded by Europeans, to the point that the Portuguese considered the Javanese maps were the best map in the early 1500s.

When Afonso de Albuquerque conquered Malacca (1511), the Portuguese recovered a chart from a Javanese maritime pilot, which already included part of the Americas. Regarding the chart Albuquerque said:

"...a large map of a Javanese pilot, containing the Cape of Good Hope, Portugal and the land of Brazil, the Red Sea and the Sea of Persia, the Clove Islands, the navigation of the Chinese and the Gores, with their rhumbs and direct routes followed by the ships, and the hinterland, and how the kingdoms border on each other. It seems to me. Sir, that this was the best thing I have ever seen, and Your Highness will be very pleased to see it; it had the names in Javanese writing, but I had with me a Javanese who could read and write. I send this piece to Your Highness, which Francisco Rodrigues traced from the other, in which Your Highness can truly see where the Chinese and Gores come from, and the course your ships must take to the Clove Islands, and where the gold mines lie, and the islands of Java and Banda, of nutmeg and mace, and the land of the King of Siam, and also the end of the land of the navigation of the Chinese, the direction it takes, and how they do not navigate farther."

— Letter of Albuquerque to King Manuel I of Portugal, 1 April 1512.

Duarte Barbosa mention places and route which the Majapahit ships visited, which include Maluku Islands, Timor, Banda, Sumatra, Malacca, China, Tenasserim, Pegu (Bago), Bengal, Pulicat, Coromandel, Malabar, Cambay (Khambat), and Aden. From the notes of other authors, it is known that there were also those who went to the Maldives, Calicut (Kozhikode), Oman, Aden, and the Red Sea. The passenger brought their wives and children, even some of them never leave the ship to go on shore, nor have any other dwelling, for they are born and die in the ship.

== Relations with regional powers ==
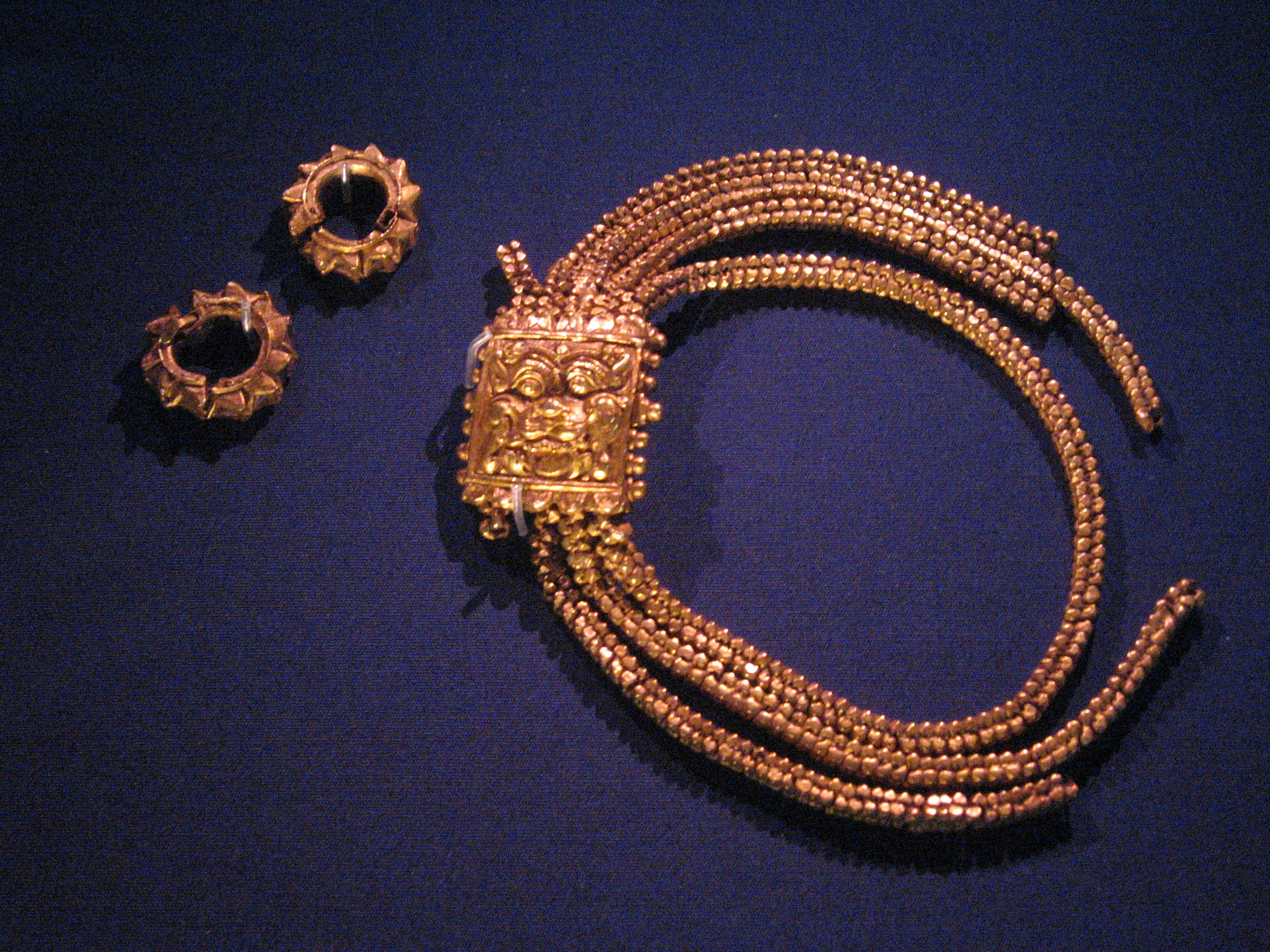
14th-century gold armlets and rings in East Javanese Majapahit style, found at Fort Canning Hill, Singapore, suggests that Tumasik or Singapura was within Majapahit sphere of influence.

For several centuries – since the era of Srivijaya and Medang Mataram (circa 10th century), the classic rivalry between Sumatran Malay states and Javanese kingdoms has shaped the dynamics of geopolitics in the region. Their activities in guarding the sea in pursuit of their economic interest, plus their military activities to safeguard this interests, has led to conflicts between Malays and Javanese. Since early of its formation, Majapahit inherited the foreign outlook of its predecessor entity – Singhasari kingdom, in which its last king Kertanegara projected his influence abroad by launching Pamalayu expedition (1275–1293) to incorporate Malay polities in Sumatra and the Malay Peninsula within Javanese sphere of influence. Previously, Singhasari seeks to dominate trade route, especially Malacca strait, and also saw the outreach of Mongolian-Chinese Yuan influence into Southeast Asia as the threat to their interest. During its formation, the returning Pamalayu expedition in 1293 has brought Malayu Kingdoms in Jambi and Dharmasraya under Javanese suzerainty. Therefore, Java often considers itself as the overlord of most of the polities in the Indonesian archipelago.

During the reign of Majapahit's first two monarch – Wijaya and Jayanegara, the kingdom struggled to consolidate its rule, plagued by several rebellions. However, it was not until the reign of its third monarch – Queen Tribhuwana Tunggadewi, and her son, Hayam Wuruk – that the kingdom began to project its power overseas. Majapahit's confidence for dominance was stemmed for their economic and demographic comparative advantage; agrarian as well as a maritime nation; their large rice production, immense human resources, well-organized society, also their mastery in shipbuilding, navigation and military technology; are excellent relatively compared to their neighbours. These strengths were used by Gajah Mada to expand the kingdom's influence and building a maritime empire. This rather imperialistic outlook has projected in the way he forcefully dealt with Majapahit's neighbours; the Pabali (conquest of Bali, 1342–1343) and the Pasunda Bubat (1356). Majapahit pulled Bali into their orbit as a vassal state. While the disastrous diplomacy with the Sunda kingdom has led to the enmity among them.

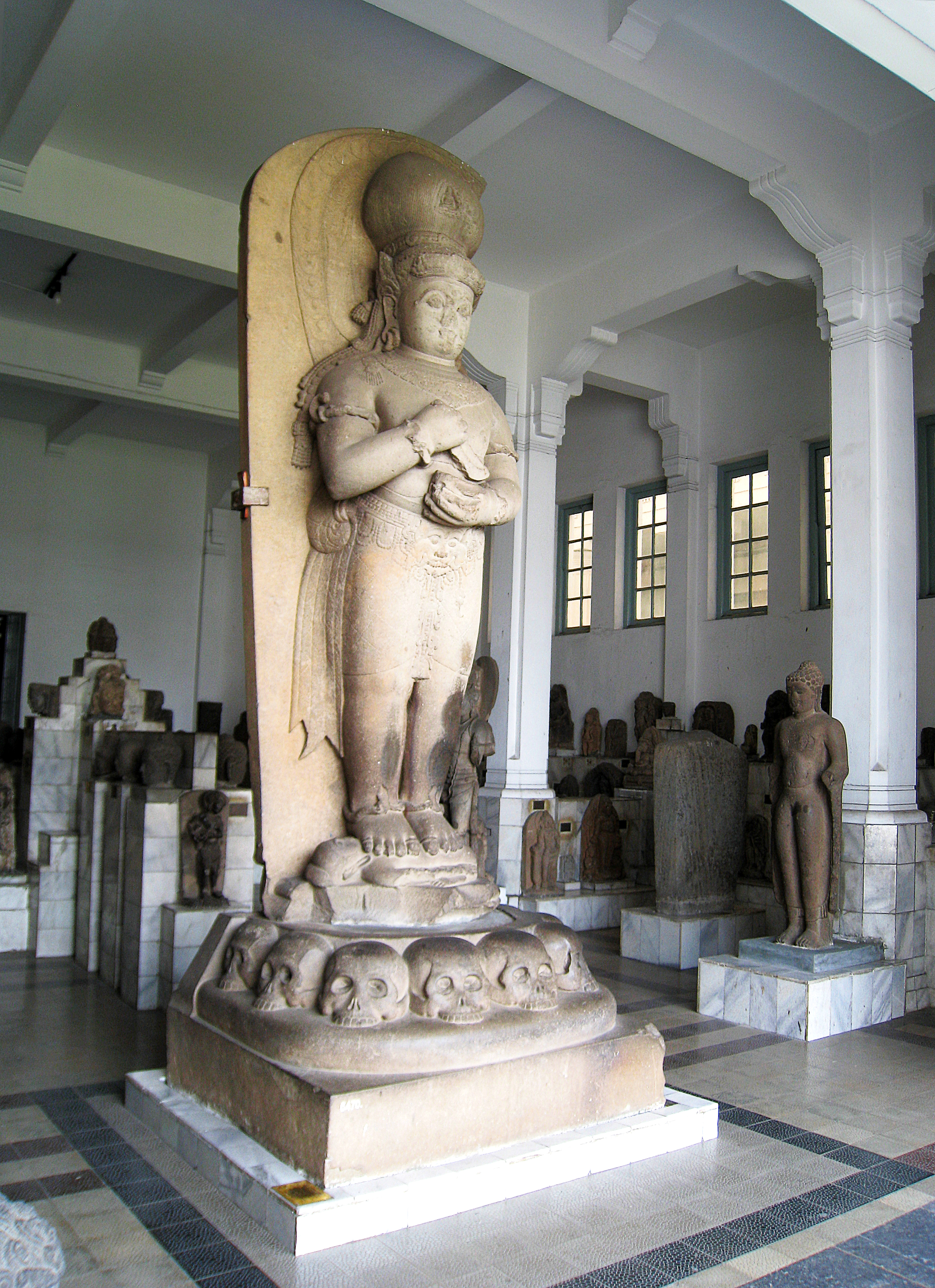
Adityawarman, a senior minister of Majapahit depicted as Bhairava. He established the Pagaruyung Kingdom in Central Sumatra.

Majapahit overlordship upon Malay states of Sumatra was demonstrated by the rule of Adityawarman of Malayupura. Adityawarman, the cousin of King Jayanegara, was raised within Majapahit palace and rose to become a senior minister in Majapahit court. He was sent to led Majapahit military expansion to conquer east coast region in Sumatra. Adityawarman then founded the royal dynasty of Minangkabau in Pagarruyung and presided over the central Sumatra region to take control of the gold trade between 1347 and 1375.

Within Indonesian archipelago, Majapahit saw itself as the centre of a huge mandala. This notion is demonstrated by its three-tier administrative hierarchy; Nagara Agung, Mancanegara, and Nusantara.

In Sumatran front, Majapahit did capture Palembang, Jambi and Dharmasraya, invade Pasai, and it also saw the settlement of Tumasik, that later become Kingdom of Singapura, as its rebellious colony, and thus deal with them accordingly.

In later years after the era of Hayam Wuruk, Majapahit has lost their grips on some of their overseas possessions. This led to the thrive and the rise of several polities previously held under Majapahit domination, such as Brunei and Malacca. The rise of Malacca in the 15th century, in particular, is important, because it represents Majapahit eventual failure to control Malacca strait. Previously Majapahit tried to contain the rise of a potential regional rival; a Malay polity in par with Srivijaya, by punishing a rebellion in Palembang and capturing Singapura. In this sense, Malacca was indeed the rival of Majapahit in the competition to dominate the archipelagic realm. Despite this perceived rivalry, in practice, however, the two kingdoms had some close and intense economic and cultural relations. At that time, the trade link between Majapahit ports of Hujung Galuh and Tuban with the port of Melaka must have thrived.

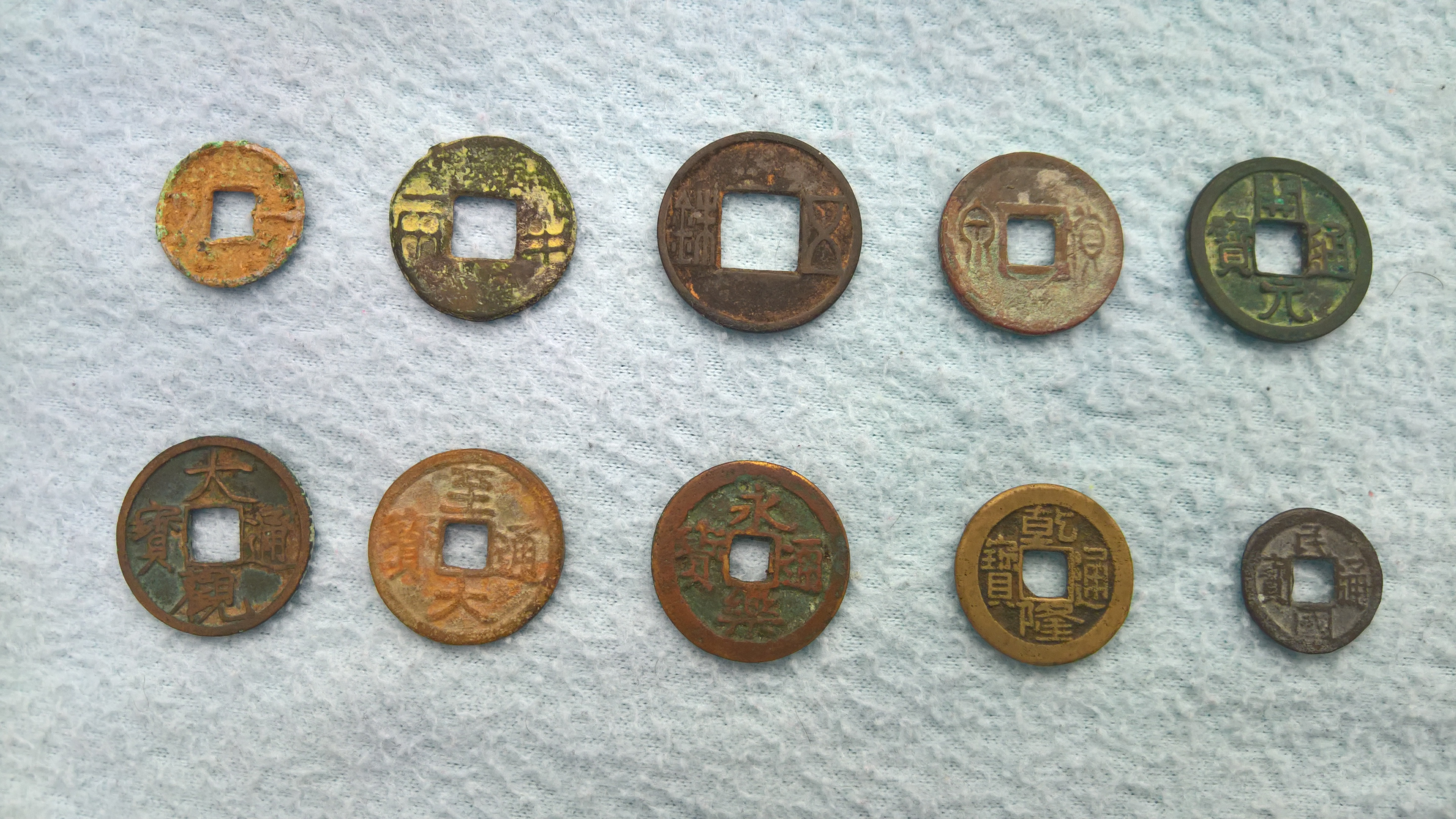
On centre bottom row (no. 8) is a Yǒng-Lè Tōng-Bǎo (永樂通寶) cash coin cast under the Yǒng-Lè Emperor (永樂帝) of Ming dynasty. These were cast in great quantities and used by Ashikaga, Ryukyu, as well as Majapahit.

Majapahit true rival for domination, however, was the powerful Ming Chinese. After the fall of Yuan, the Ming Emperor eager to project his power into Southeast Asia. On the other hand, Majapahit saw this archipelagic realm as theirs and unwelcome to any perceived Chinese interference. After Majapahit was weakened by Paregreg civil war, and incessant conflicts among its nobles, the arrival of the formidable Ming treasure voyages led by Zheng He upon Majapahit shores has pushed Majapahit prestige and power to the side. Ming on the other hand, actively support the rise of Malacca. This Ming protection has made Majapahit unwilling and unable to push Malacca anymore.

Majapahit ultimate nemesis, however, was located very close at home; the Demak Sultanate on the northern coast of Central Java. Ming support to Malacca, and Malacca active proselytizing of Islam, has led to the thriving and rise of Muslim traders community in the archipelago, including in Majapahit ports on the north coast of Java. This in turn gradually corroded the prestige of Javanese Hindu-Buddhist kingship, and after several generations, led to the fall of once-mighty Majapahit empire.

== Legacy ==
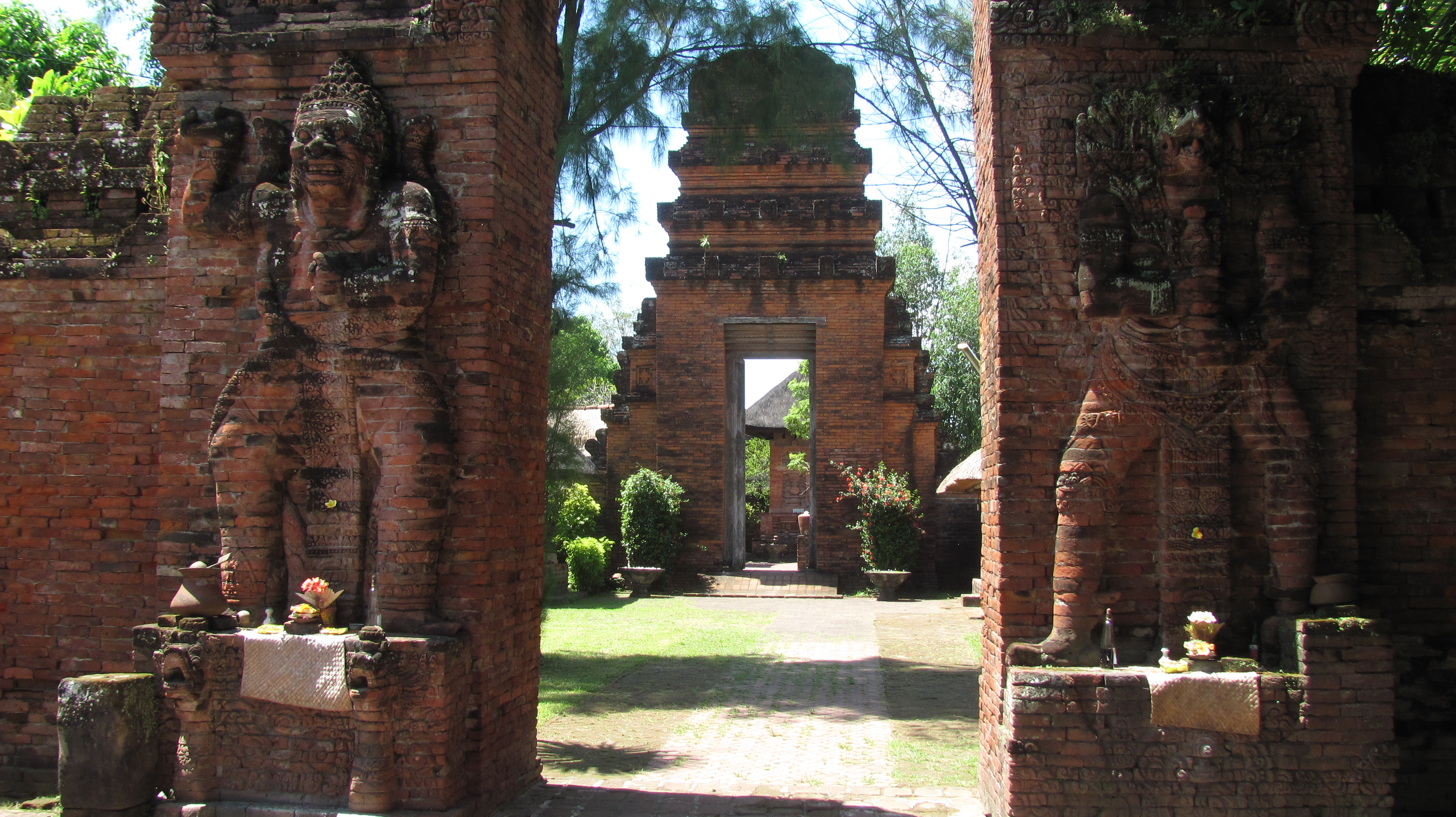
Pura Maospahit ("Majapahit Temple") in Denpasar, Bali, demonstrate the typical Majapahit red brick architecture.

Majapahit was the largest empire ever to form in Southeast Asia. Although its political power beyond the core area in east Java was diffuse, constituting mainly ceremonial recognition of suzerainty, Majapahit society developed a high degree of sophistication in both commercial and artistic activities. Its capital was inhabited by a cosmopolitan population among whom literature and art flourished.

Numbers of local legends and folklores in the region had mentioned about the Majapahit kingdom. Other than Javanese sources, some regional legends mentioning Majapahit kingdom or its general Gajah Mada also can be found; from Aceh, Minangkabau, Palembang, the Malay Peninsula, Sunda, Brunei, Bali to Sumbawa. Most of them mentioned about the incoming Javanese forces to their land, which was probably a local testament of the empire's expansive nature that once dominating the archipelago. The Hikayat Raja Pasai, a 14th-century Aceh chronicle tell a Majapahit naval invasion against Samudra Pasai in 1350. The chronicle described that the Majapahit invasion was a punishment for Sultan Ahmad Malik Az-Zahir's crime on ruining a royal marriage between Pasai Prince Tun Abdul Jalil and Raden Galuh Gemerencang, a Majapahit princess – that led to the death of the royal couple.

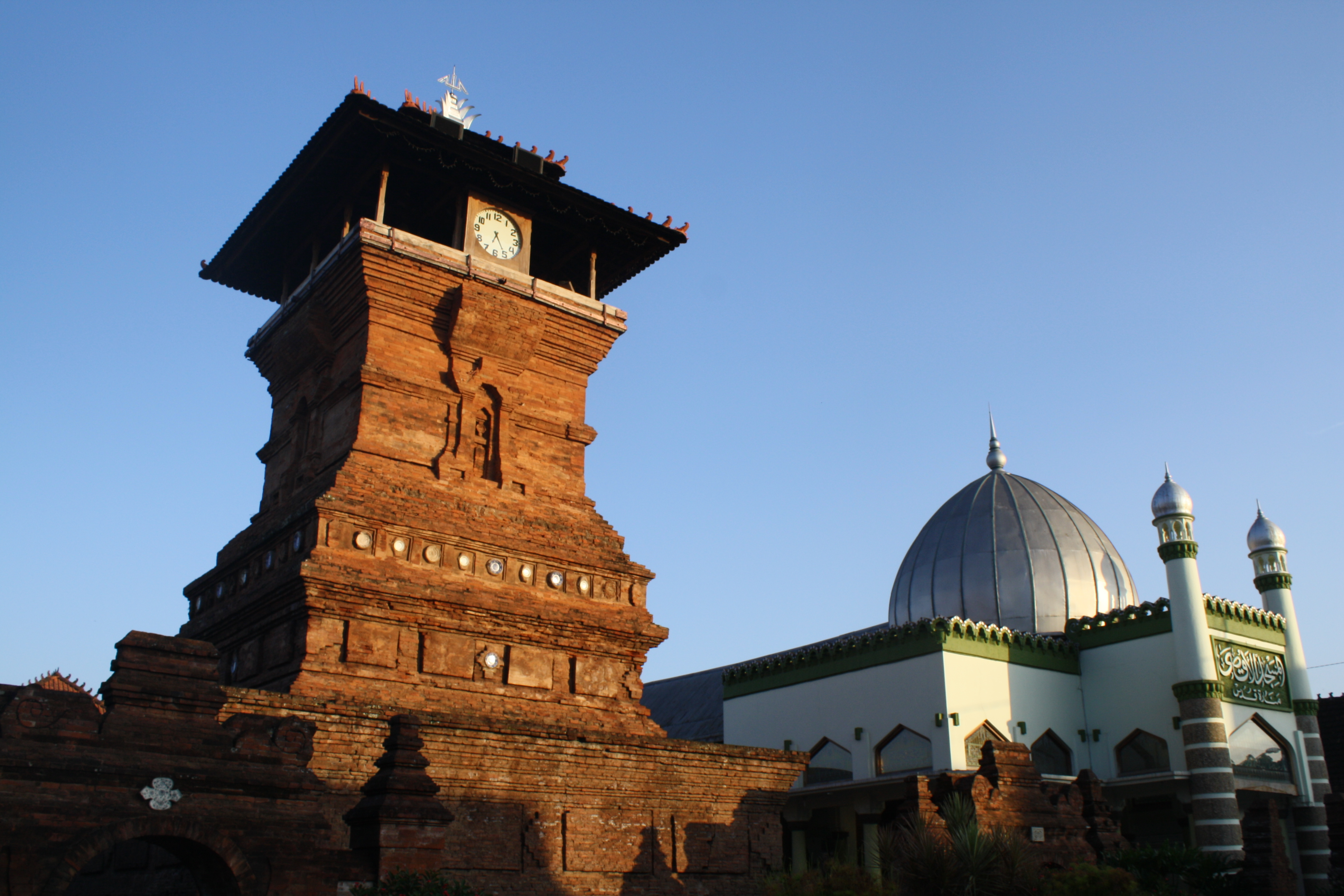
The Majapahit style minaret of Kudus Mosque

In West Sumatra, the legend of Minangkabau mentioned an invading foreign prince – associated with Javanese Majapahit kingdom – being defeated in a buffalo fight. In West Java, the Pasunda Bubat tragedy caused a myth to revolve around Indonesians, which forbids marriage between a Sundanese and a Javanese, as it would be unsustainable and only bring misery to the couple. In Malay Peninsula, the Malay Annals mentioned the legend of the fall of Singapura to Majapahit forces in 1398 was due to the betrayal of Sang Rajuna Tapa that opened the fortified city gate. In Brunei, the folk legend of Lumut Lunting and Pilong-Pilongan islands in Brunei Bay also connected to Majapahit.

Several Javanese legends were originated or become popular during the Majapahit period. The Panji cycles, the tale of Sri Tanjung, and the epic of Damarwulan, are popular tales in Javanese and Balinese literatures. The tales of Panji was dated from the older period during Kediri kingdom, while the tale of Sri Tanjung and the epic of Damarwulan took place during the Majapahit period. These tales remained a popular theme in Javanese culture of later period during Mataram Sultanate, and often became the source of inspiration for wayang shadow puppet performance, ketoprak and topeng dance drama. The Panji tales, in particular, have spread from East Java to become a source of inspiration for literature and dance drama throughout the region, as far as the Malay Peninsula, Cambodia and Siam where he is known as Raden Inao or Enau (Thai: อิเหนา) of Kurepan.

Majapahit had a momentous and lasting influence on Indonesian art and architecture. The empire's expansion circa 14th-century contributed to the diffusion Javanese cultural influence throughout the archipelago, which can be seen as a form of Javanisation. It was probably during this period that some of the Javanese cultural elements, such as gamelan and kris, being expanded and introduced to islands outside of Java. The descriptions of the architecture of the capital's pavilions (pendopo) in the Nagarakretagama evoke the Javanese Kraton also the Balinese temples and palace compounds of today. The Majapahit architectural style that often employs terracotta and red brick heavily influenced the architecture of Java and Bali in the later period. The Majapahit style candi bentar split gate, the kori or paduraksa towering red-brick gate, and also pendopo pavilion have become ubiquitous in Javanese and Balinese architectural features, as seen in Menara Kudus Mosque, Keraton Kasepuhan and Sunyaragi park in Cirebon, Mataram Sultanate royal cemetery in Kota Gede, Yogyakarta, and various palaces and temples in Bali.

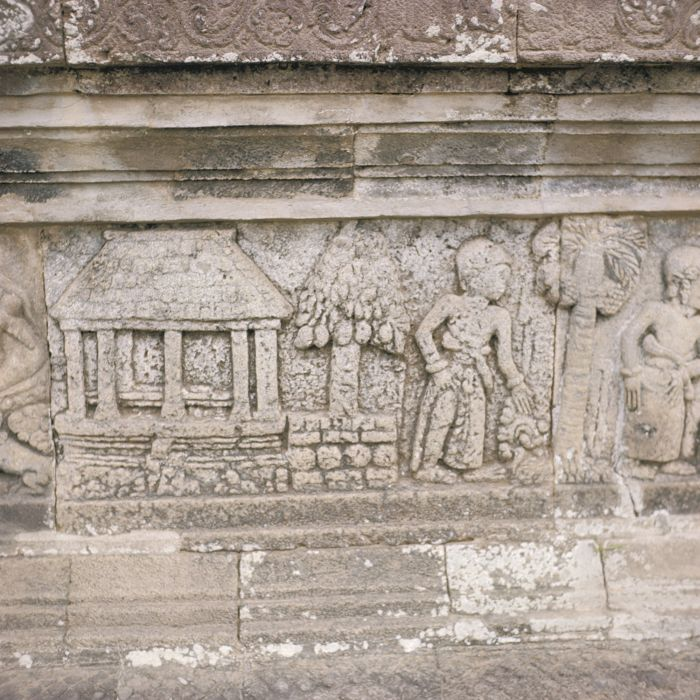
Bas relief from Candi Penataran describes the Javanese-style pendopo pavilion, commonly found across Java and Bali.

The vivid, rich and festive Balinese culture is considered one of Majapahit's legacy. The Javanese Hindu civilisation since the era of Airlangga to the era of Majapahit kings has profoundly influenced and shaped the Balinese culture and history. The ancient links and Majapahit legacy is observable in many ways; architecture, literature, religious rituals, dance-drama and artforms. The aesthetics and style of bas-reliefs in Majapahit East Javanese temples were preserved and copied in Balinese temples. It is also because, after the fall of the empire, many Majapahit nobles, artisans and priests had taken refuge either in the interior mountainous region of East Java or across the narrow strait to Bali. Indeed, in some ways, the Kingdom of Bali was the successor of Majapahit. Large numbers of Majapahit manuscripts, such as Nagarakretagama, Sutasoma, Pararaton and Tantu Pagelaran, were being well-kept in royal libraries of Bali and Lombok and provides the glimpse and valuable historical records on Majapahit. The Majapahit Hindu-Javanese culture has shaped the culture of Bali, that led to popular expression; "without Java, there is no Bali". Yet in return, Bali is credited as the last stronghold to safeguard and preserve the ancient Hindu Javanese civilisation.

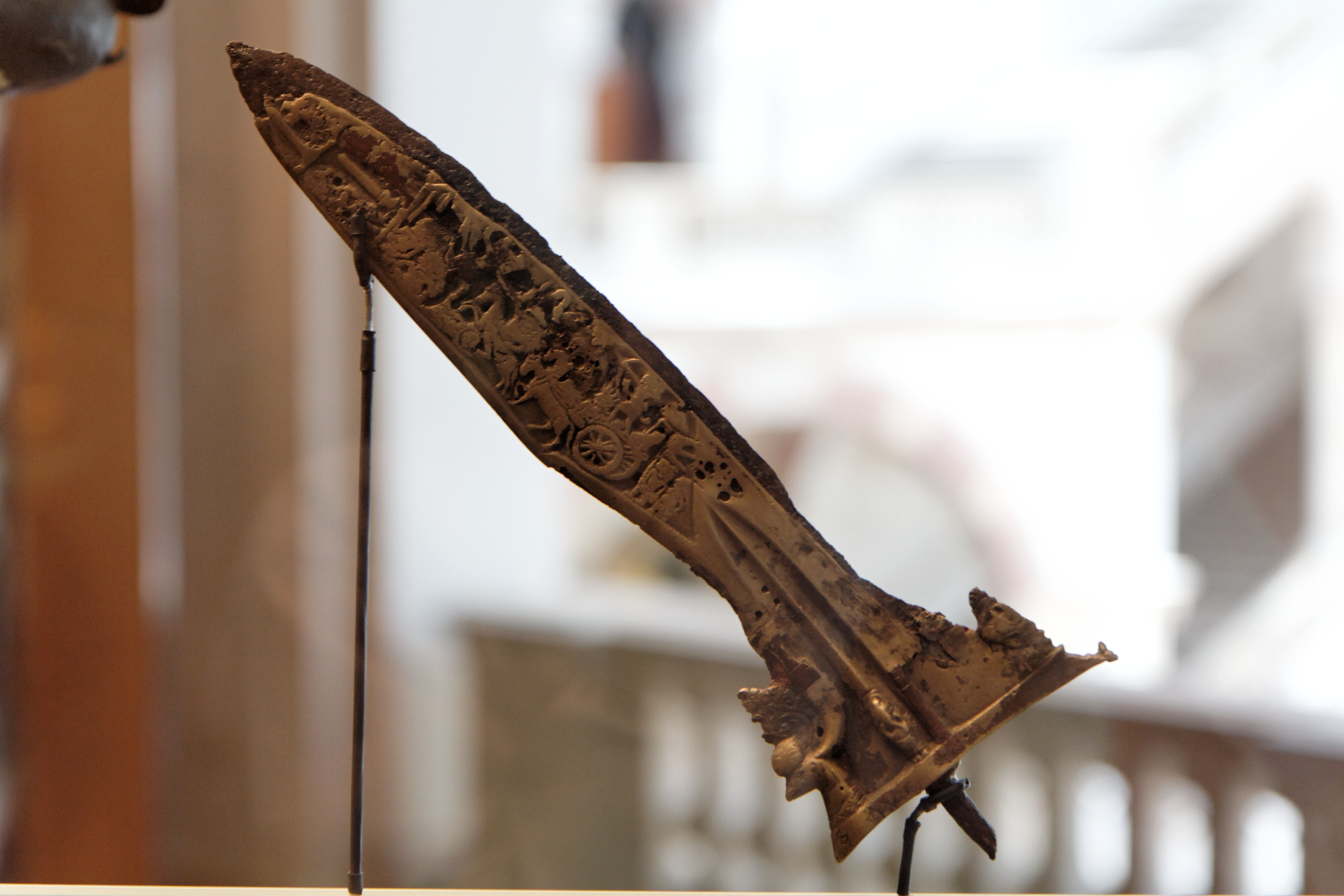
The Kris of Knaud, one of the oldest surviving kris, is dated to Majapahit period.

In weaponry, the Majapahit expansion is believed to be responsible for the widespread use of the keris dagger in Southeast Asia; from Java, Bali, Sumatra, Malaysia, Brunei to Southern Thailand. Although it has been suggested that the keris, and native daggers similar to it, predate Majapahit, nevertheless the empire expansion contributed to its popularity and diffusion in the region around the year 1492. For example, Kris of Knaud, one of the oldest surviving kris is dated to 1264 Śaka (which correspondents to 1342). The Malay legend of Kris Taming Sari is also attributed to Majapahit origin.

For Indonesians in later centuries, Majapahit became a symbol of past greatness. The Islamic sultanates of Demak, Pajang, and Mataram sought to establish their legitimacy to the Majapahit. The Demak claimed a line of succession through Kertabumi, as its founder Raden Patah, in court chronicles was said to be the son of Kertabumi with Putri Cina, a Chinese princess, who had been sent away before her son was born. Sultan Agung's conquest of Wirasaba (present-day Mojoagung) in 1615 – during that time just a small town without significant strategic and economic value – led by the sultan himself, may probably have had such symbolic importance as it was the location of the former Majapahit capital. Central Javanese palaces have traditions and genealogy that attempt to prove links back to the Majapahit royal lines – usually in the form of a grave as a vital link in Java – where legitimacy is enhanced by such a connection. Bali, in particular, was heavily influenced by Majapahit and the Balinese consider themselves to be the true heirs of the kingdom.

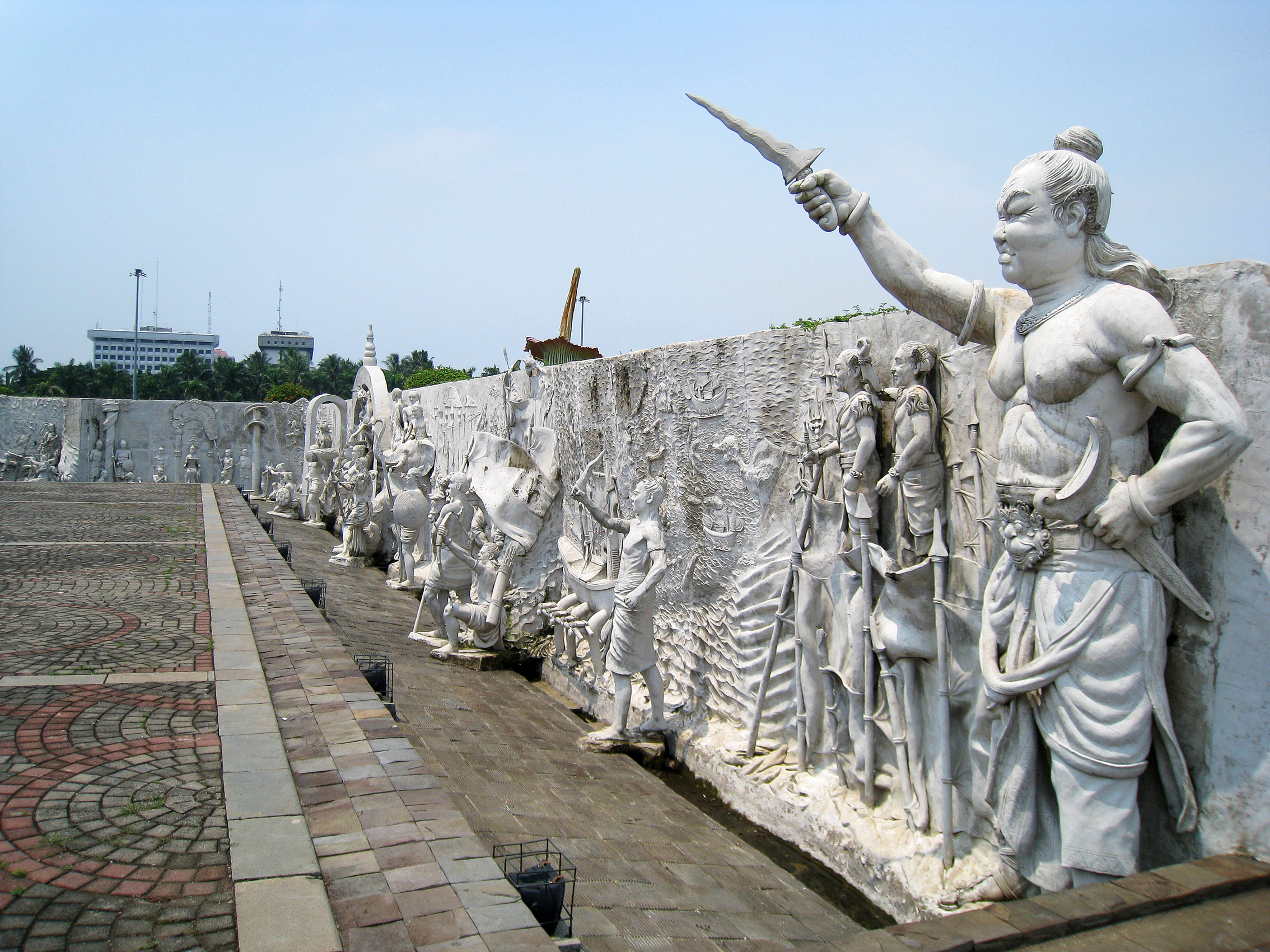
The high reliefs of Gajah Mada and Majapahit history depicted in Monas has become the source of Indonesian national pride of past greatness.

Modern Indonesian nationalists, including those of the early 20th-century Indonesian National Revival, have invoked the Majapahit Empire. Indonesian founding fathers—especially Sukarno and Mohammad Yamin, built a historical construct around Majapahit to argue for the ancient unified realm, as a predecessor of modern Indonesia. The memory of its greatness remains in Indonesia and is sometimes seen as a precedent for the current political boundaries of the Republic. Many of modern Indonesian national symbols derived from Majapahit Hindu-Buddhist elements. The Indonesian national motto, "Bhinneka Tunggal Ika", is a quotation from an Old Javanese poem "Kakawin Sutasoma", written by a Majapahit poet, Mpu Tantular.

The Indonesian coat of arms, Garuda Pancasila, also derives from Javanese Hindu elements. The statue and relief of Garuda have been found in many temples in Java such as Prambanan from the ancient Mataram era, and the Panataran as well as the Sukuh temple dated from the Majapahit era. The notable statue of Garuda is the statue of the king Airlangga depicted as Vishnu riding Garuda.

In its propaganda from the 1920s, the Communist Party of Indonesia presented its vision of a classless society as a reincarnation of a romanticised Majapahit. It was invoked by Sukarno for nation building and by the New Order as an expression of state expansion and consolidation. Like Majapahit, the modern state of Indonesia covers vast territory and is politically centred on Java.

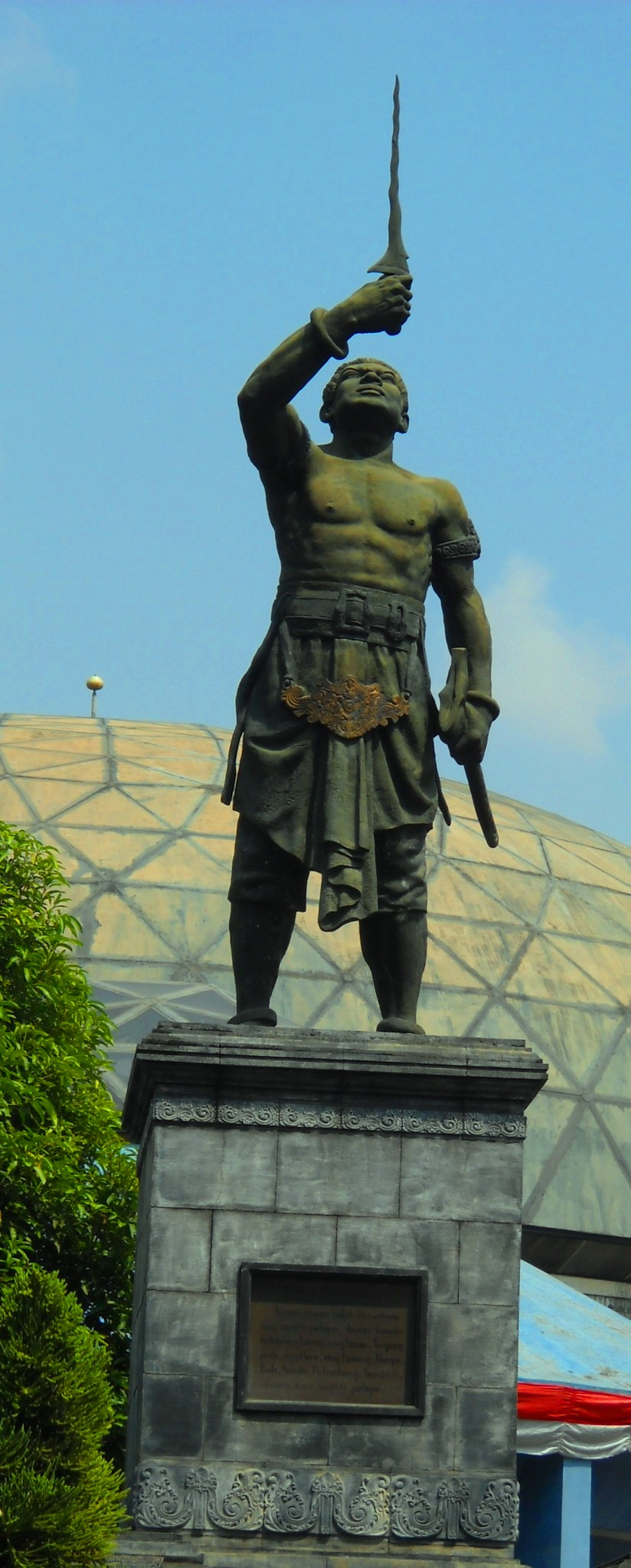
Gajah Mada statue in front of the now-demolished Telecommunication Museum in Taman Mini Indonesia Indah, Jakarta. Palapa, Indonesia's first telecommunication satellite launched on 9 July 1976 was named after Palapa oath.

Palapa, the series of communication satellites owned by Telkom Indonesia, an Indonesian telecommunication company, was named after Sumpah Palapa, the famous oath taken by Gajah Mada, who swore that he would not taste any spice as long as he had not succeeded in unifying Nusantara (Indonesian archipelago). This ancient oath of unification signifies the Palapa satellite as the modern means to unify the Indonesian archipelago by way of telecommunication. The name was chosen by the president Suharto, and the program was started in February 1975.

Pura Kawitan Majapahit was built in 1995 as a homage to honour the empire that inspires the nation. Majapahit is often regarded as the antecedent of the modern state of Indonesia. This Hindu temple complex is located within Trowulan just north of Segaran pool.

During the last half-year of 2008, the Indonesian government sponsored a massive exploration on the site that is believed to be the place where the palace of Majapahit once stood. Jero Wacik, the Indonesian Minister of Culture and Tourism stated that the Majapahit Park would be built on the site and completed as early as 2009, to prevent further damage caused by home-made brick industries that developed in the surrounding area. Nevertheless, the project leaves a huge attention to some historians, since constructing the park's foundation in Segaran site located in south side of Trowulan Museum will inevitably damage the site itself. Ancient bricks which are historically valuable were found scattered on the site. The government then argued that the method they were applying were less destructive since digging method were used instead of drilling.

== List of rulers ==
Genealogy diagram of the Rajasa dynasty, the royal family of Singhasari and Majapahit. Rulers are highlighted with period of reign.

The rulers of Majapahit belong to the Rajasa dynasty, which was founded in the early 13th century by Sri Ranggah Rajasa, the first king of Singhasari.

Reign	Monarch	Capital	Information and events
1293–1309	Saṅgrāmavijaya, styled Kṛtarājasa Jayavardhana	Trowulan	Victory against Mongol forces sent by Kublai Khan of the Yuan dynasty (1293).; Ascended to Javanese throne on the 15th Kārttika of 1215 Śaka (10 November 1293).; Ranggalawe rebellion (1295).
1309–1328	Jayanagara, styled Sundarapāṇḍyadevādhīśvara	Trowulan	Nambi rebellion (1316).; Kuti rebellion (1319).; Jayanagara's assassination by Tanca (1328).
1328–1350s	Gitārjā, styled Tribhuvanottuṅgadevī Jayaviṣṇuvardhanī	Trowulan	Sadeng and Keta rebellion (1331).; Pabali, the conquest of Bali (1342–1343).; Conquest of Samudra Pasai (1349–1350).
1350s–1389/1399	Hayam Wuruk, styled Rājasanagara	Trowulan	Pasunda Bubat (1357).; Majapahit golden age described in the Nagarakṛtāgama (1365).; Punitive attack on the Palembang rebellion (1377).
1389/1399–1429	Vikramavardhana, styled Bhaṭāra Viśeṣa	Trowulan	Siege and invasion of Singapura (1398).; Paregreg civil war (1405–1406), Vikramavardhana defeating Bhre Vīrabhūmi.; Campaign against Pagarruyung (1409).
1429–1447	Suhitā	Trowulan	
1447–1451	Kṛtavijaya, styled Vijayaparākramavardhana	Trowulan	
1451–1453	Vijayakumāra, styled Rājasavardhana	Trowulan	
1453–1456	Interregnum		
1456–1466	Sūryavikrama, styled Girīśavardhana	Trowulan	
1466–1478	Suraprabhāva, styled Siṅhavikramavardhana	Trowulan	
c. 1486–1527	Girīndravardhana	Trowulan	Demak-Majapahit conflicts (1478-1527).

== Family tree ==
Family Tree of Majapahit Emperors

Dharmasraya; Kingdom	Singhasari; Kingdom
♀ Indreswari	Kertarajasa; Jayawardhana^{(1)} r. 1293–1309	♀ Gayatri; Rajapatni
Sri; Sundarapandya; Dewa Adhiswara^{(2)} r. 1309–1328	♀ Sri Tribhuwana; Wijayatungga dewi^{(3)} r. 1328–1351	Cakradhara
Sri; Rajasanagara^{(4)} r. 1351–1389	Singhawardhana	♀ Dyah Nertaja
♀ Kusumawardhani	Wikrama wardhana^{(5)} r. 1389–1429	♀ Bhre Daha
Wijaya; Parakrama wardhana^{(7)} r. 1447–1451	Bhre Hyang; Parameswara; Ratnapangkaja	♀ Sri Suhita^{(6)} r. 1429–1447
Rajasawardhana; Sang Sinagara^{(8)} r. 1451–1453	Girishawardhana^{(9)} r. 1456–1466	Sri Adi; Suraprabhawa^{(10)} r. 1466–1478
Girindrawardhana; Dyah; Ranawijaya^{(11)} fl. 1478

== Majapahit in popular culture ==
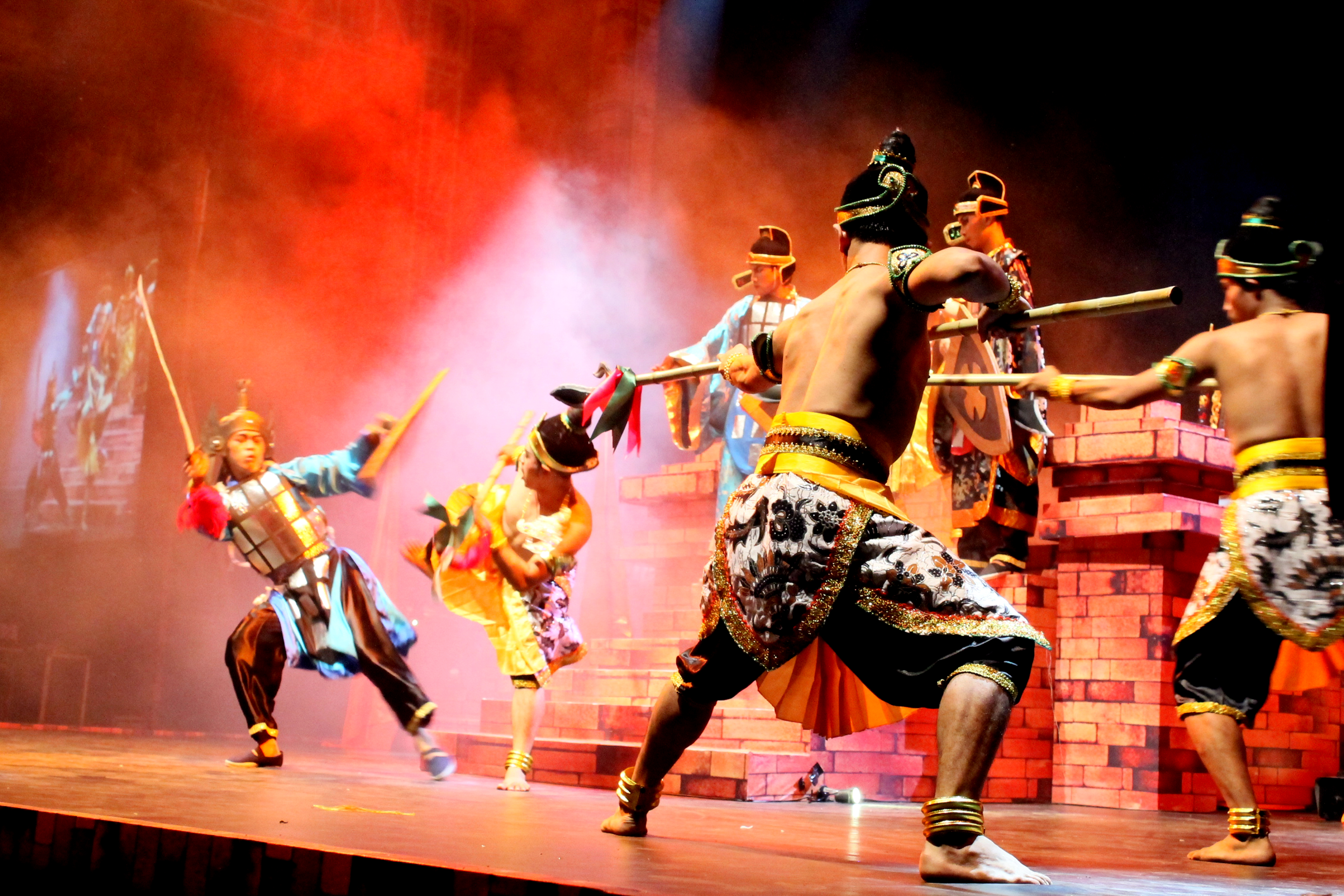
Theatrical performance depicting the Mongol invasion of Java, performed by 150 students of Indonesian Institute of the Arts, Yogyakarta. The history of Majapahit continues to inspire contemporary artists.

Celebrated as 'the golden era of the archipelago', the Majapahit empire has inspired many writers and artists (and continues to do so) to create their works based on this era or to describe and mention it. The impact of the Majapahit theme on popular culture can be seen in the following:

=== Literature ===
- Sandyakalaning Majapahit (1933), or Twilight/Sunset in Majapahit is a historical romance that took place during the fall of Majapahit empire, written by Sanusi Pane.
- Panji Koming (since 1979), a weekly comic strip by Dwi Koendoro published in the Sunday edition of Kompas, telling the everyday life of Panji Koming, a common Majapahit citizen. Although it took place in the Majapahit era, the comic strip serves as witty satire and criticism of modern Indonesian society. From a political, social, cultural and current point of view, Indonesia is described as the 'reincarnation' of the Majapahit empire. The current Indonesian president is often portrayed as a Majapahit monarch or prime minister.
- Senopati Pamungkas (1986, reprinted in 2003), a martial art-historical epic novel by Arswendo Atmowiloto. It takes place in the late Singhasari period and formation of Majapahit. This novel describes the sagas, royal intrigues, and romance of the formation of the kingdom as well as the adventure of the main character, a commoner named Upasara Wulung and his forbidden love affair with princess Gayatri Rajapatni, whom later becomes the consort of Raden Wijaya, the first king of Majapahit.
- Imperium Majapahit, a comic book series by Jan Mintaraga, published by Elexmedia Komputindo. This series tells the history of Majapahit from its formation until the decline.
- Gajah Mada, a pentalogy written by Langit Kresna Hariadi depicting a fictionalised detail of Gajah Mada's life from the Kuti rebellion up to the Bubat War.
- Dyah Pitaloka (2007), a novel written by Hermawan Aksan, fictionalising the detailed life story of Sundanese princess Dyah Pitaloka Citraresmi set around the Bubat War. The novel virtually takes the same context and was inspired by the Kidung Sundayana.
- Jung Jawa (2009), an anthology of short stories written by Rendra Fatrisna Kurniawan, imagining the life of the Nusantara people, published by Babel Publishing.

=== Film and Radio ===
- Saur Sepuh (1987–1991), a radio drama and film by Niki Kosasih. Begun as a popular radio drama program in the late 1980s, Saur Sepuh is based on 15th-century Java, centred around the story about a fictional hero named Brama Kumbara, the king of Madangkara, a fictional kingdom neighbour of the Pajajaran. In several stories the Paregreg war is described, that is to say, the civil war of Majapahit between Wikramawardhana and Bhre Wirabhumi. This part has been made into a single feature film entitled 'Saur Sepuh' as well.
- Tutur Tinular, a radio drama and film by S Tidjab. Tutur Tinular is a martial art historical epic fictional story with the Majapahit era serving as the background of the story. The story also involved a romance between the hero named Arya Kamandanu and his Chinese lover Mei Shin.
- Wali Songo, the film tells the story of nine Muslim saints ('wali') who spread Islam to Java. The story took place near the end of the Majapahit era and the formation of Demak. It describes the decaying Majapahit empire where royals are fighting each other for power while the commoners suffer.
- Puteri Gunung Ledang (2004), a Malaysian epic film based on a traditional Malay legend. This film recounts the love story between Gusti Putri Retno Dumilah, a Majapahit princess, and Hang Tuah, a Malaccan admiral.

=== Video game ===
- Civilization 5: Brave New World (2013), where Gajah Mada appeared as one of the leaders of a great civilisation in the second expansion of the Civilization 5 game. He is the leader of the Indonesian civilisation, with the emblem of the Indonesian empire being the Surya Majapahit, although in the game the empire is known as the "Indonesian empire" instead.
- Later, in Civilization 6 (2016), a downloadable content has one of its rulers, Dyah Gitarja (referred as Gitarja in-game) as the leader of the Indonesian civilization, with the emblem being a simpler version of the Surya Majapahit. The unique unit of Indonesian civilization is the jong.
- On the Rise of the Rajas expansion pack from Age of Empires II, Gajah Mada appears in a campaign detailing his rise and then fall after the Pasunda Bubat tragedy. He also made appearance in the Age of Empires II: Definitive Edition.
- A unit called Cetbang Cannon is available for Indonesia, a revolutionary nation available for the Dutch and Portuguese civilization in Age of Empires III: Definitive Edition.
- Majapahit is featured as a civilization in Civilization VII. They appear during the exploration period of the game.

== See also ==
- Majapahit Museum
- Gosari inscription
- Indonesian Esoteric Buddhism
- Javanese Kshatriya
- Kidung Sunda
- List of monarchs of Java
- Osing
- Srivijaya
- Tenggerese
- Hinduism in Indonesia
- Hinduism in Java
- Bali
- Majapahit train

== Bibliography ==
- Abshire, Jean E. (2011), The History of Singapore, Greenwood, ISBN 978-0-313-37742-6
- Hall, D.G.E. (1981). A History of South-East Asia (4th ed.). London: The Macmillan Press Ltd. ISBN 978-1-349-16521-6.
- Muljana, Raden Benedictus Slamet (2005). Al-Fayyadl, Muhammad (ed.). Menuju Puncak Kemegahan: Sejarah Kerajaan Majapahit. Yogyakarta: LKiS Pelangi Aksara.
- Nugroho, Irawan Djoko (2009). Meluruskan Sejarah Majapahit. Ragam Media.
- Nugroho, Irawan Djoko (2011). Majapahit Peradaban Maritim. Suluh Nuswantara Bakti. ISBN 978-602-9346-00-8.
- Pigeaud, Theodoor Gautier Thomas (1960a). Java in the 14th Century: A Study in Cultural History, Volume I: Javanese Texts in Transcription (3rd (revised) ed.). The Hague: Martinus Nijhoff.
- Pigeaud, Theodoor Gautier Thomas (1960b). Java in the 14th Century: A Study in Cultural History, Volume II: Notes on the Texts and the Translations (3rd (revised) ed.). The Hague: Martinus Nijhoff. ISBN 978-94-011-8774-9.
- Pigeaud, Theodoor Gautier Thomas (1960c). Java in the 14th Century: A Study in Cultural History, Volume III: Translations (3rd (revised) ed.). The Hague: Martinus Nijhoff. ISBN 978-94-011-8772-5.
- Pigeaud, Theodoor Gautier Thomas (1962). Java in the 14th Century: A Study in Cultural History, Vol. IV: Commentaries and Recapitulations (3rd (revised) ed.). The Hague: Martinus Nijhoff. ISBN 978-94-017-7133-7.
- Pigeaud, Theodoor Gautier Thomas (1963). Java in the 14th Century: A Study in Cultural History, Volume V: Glossary, General Index (3rd (revised) ed.). The Hague: Martinus Nijhoff. ISBN 978-94-011-8778-7.
- Prapanca, Mpu (2018). Isidora (ed.). Kakawin Nagarakertagama: Teks Asli dan Terjemahan. Translated by Saktiani, Damaika; Widya, Kartika; Aminullah, Zakaria Pamuji; Marginingrum, Novi; Septi, Neda (2nd (revised) ed.). Yogyakarta: Narasi. ISBN 978-979-168-553-5.
- Sabrizain, Palembang Prince or Singapore Renegade?
- Tsang, Susan; Perera, Audrey (2011), Singapore at Random, Didier Millet, ISBN 978-981-4260-37-4
