= Puri =

Puri most commonly refers to:

- Puri (city), a city in Odisha‌, India‌.
- Puri (food), a deep-fried bread made from wheat in India

Puri may also refer to:

== Places ==
- -puri, Indian placename element
- Puri, Angola, a town and municipality in Uíge Province in Angola
- Puri district, a district of Odisha, India
  - Puri (Lok Sabha constituency), Odisha, India
  - Puri (Vidhan Sabha constituency), Odisha, India
- Puri, a palace in certain Bali kingdoms
- Puri, East Java, a district in Mojokerto Regency, East Java, Indonesia
- Puri, short for Puri Indah, a housing estate in Kembangan, Jakarta, Indonesia

== Food ==
- Panipuri, a type of street food in India
- Sev puri, a type of street food in India
- Bhel puri, a type of snack in India
- Shotis puri, a type of traditional Georgian bread

== People ==
- Puri people, an indigenous people of Brazil
- Puri (surname), an Indian surname
- Puri Jagannadh (born 1966), Indian film director and producer
- Puri Yáñez (born 1936), Spanish-born surrealist painte

== See also ==
- Pur (disambiguation)
- Puri Puri (disambiguation)
- Pori (disambiguation)
