= Gauda–Gupta War =

- Part of List of wars involving Guptas
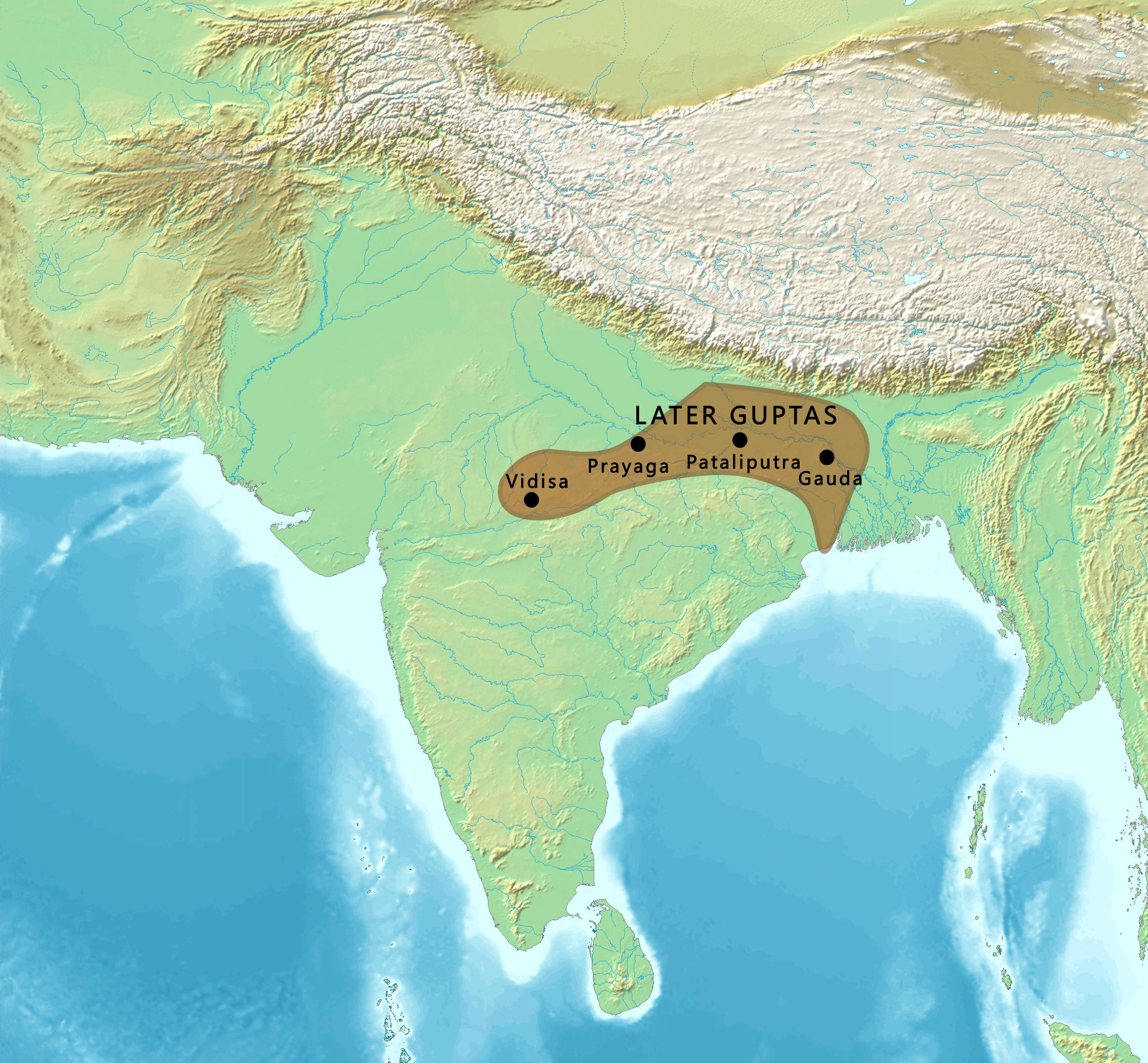
- The Later Gupta kingdom at its zenith around c. 590 CE, and its neighbours
Date	550–560 AD
Location	Gauḍa (region)
Result	Maukhari-Gupta alliance victory
Territorial changes	Gaudas forced to fall back upon the Deltaic region to the east of the Bhagirathi.

Belligerents
Gupta Empire: Later Guptas; Maukhari dynasty	Gauda Kingdom

Commanders and leaders
Kumaragupta III; Jivitgupta I Ishanavarman	Gopachandra; Dharmaditya; Samacharadeva

The Gauda–Gupta War was a conflict between Gopachandra on one side with Ishanavarman and Jivitagupta I on the other side. The war resulted in the defeat of the Gauda Kingdom.

== Background ==
(Line 1.)-Just as the full-moon, destitute of spots, the destroyer of the darkness, was produced from the ocean, so from him there was born a son, the majestic one, named the illustrious Harshagupta, who,--raining down a terrible flight of arrows from (his) firm bow that was bent with ease at the befitting proper time, (and) being gazed upon with copious tears by (his enemies) who, averse to the abode of the goddess of fortune being with (him, her) own lord, were stupified (at being unable to prevent it),-was (always) displaying a glorious triumph, the written record as it were of terrible contests, in the guise of the rows of the knots of hard callous places, caused by wounds from many weapons, on (his) chest.
(L. 3.)-His son was the illustrious Jîvitagupta, the best among kings, who was a very-cold-rayed (moon) to (wither) the waterlilies that were the countenances of the women of (his) proud enemies. The very terrible scorching fever (of fear) left not (his) haughty foes, even though they stood on seaside shores that were cool with the flowing and ebbing currents of water, (and) were covered with the branches of plantain-trees severed by the trunks of elephants roaming through the lofty groves of palmyra-palms; (or) even though they stood on (that) mountain (Himâlaya) which is cold with the water of the rushing and waving torrents full of snow. Even still his superhuman deeds are regarded with astonishment by all mankind, like the leap of (the monkey Hanumat) the son of the Wind from the side of (the mountain) Kôshavardhana.

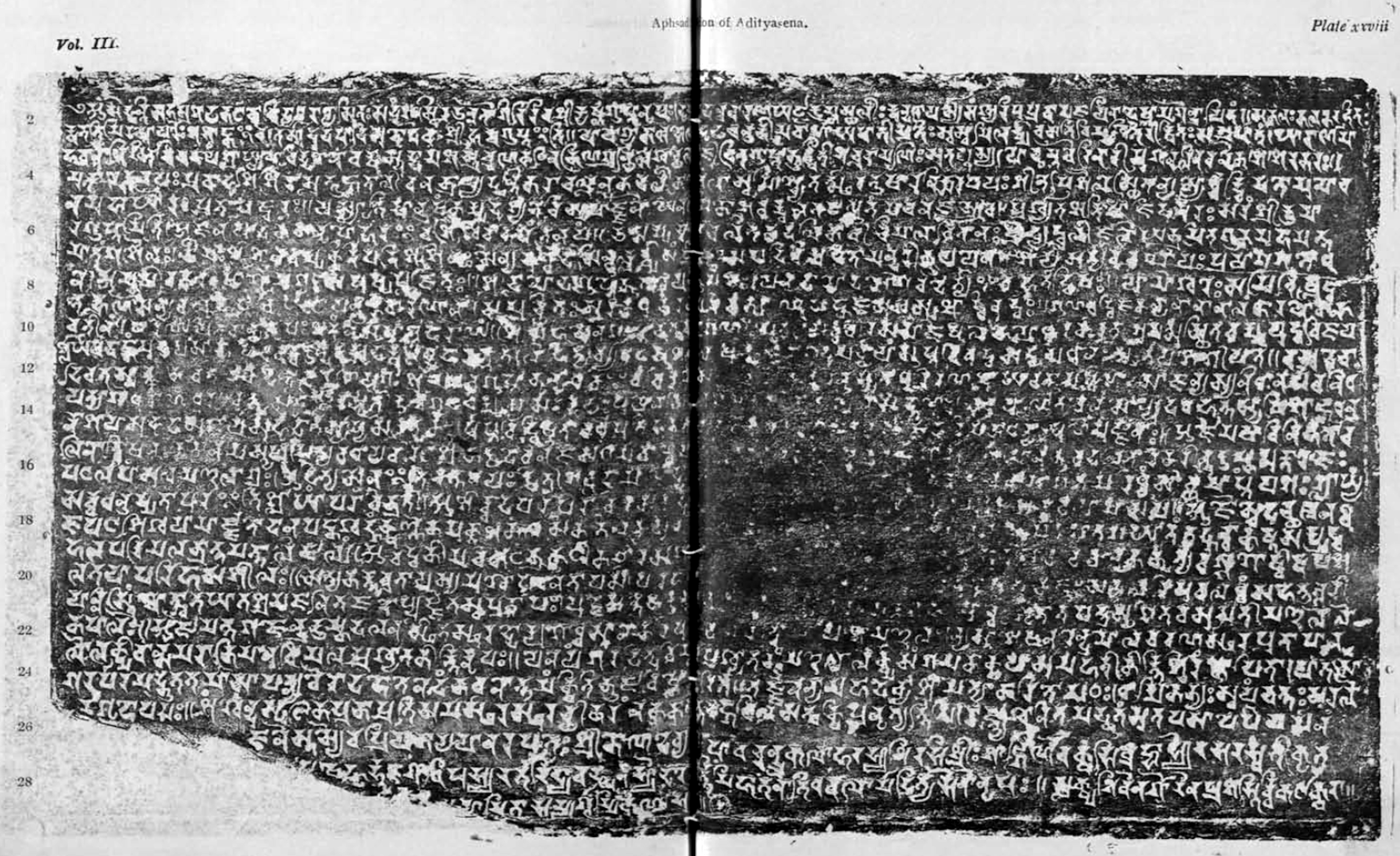
Aphsad inscription of Ādityasena (rubbing).

According to the Aphsad inscription of Ādityasena (seventh century) Kumaragupta (fourth King of the dynasty) was contemporary to the Maukhari King Ishanavarman. It is probable the first three Later Gupta Kings were contemporary to the first three Maukhari Kings. It is further proven that the second King (Adityavarman) married Harshaguptā, the sister of the second Later Gupta King (Harshagupta).

== The War ==
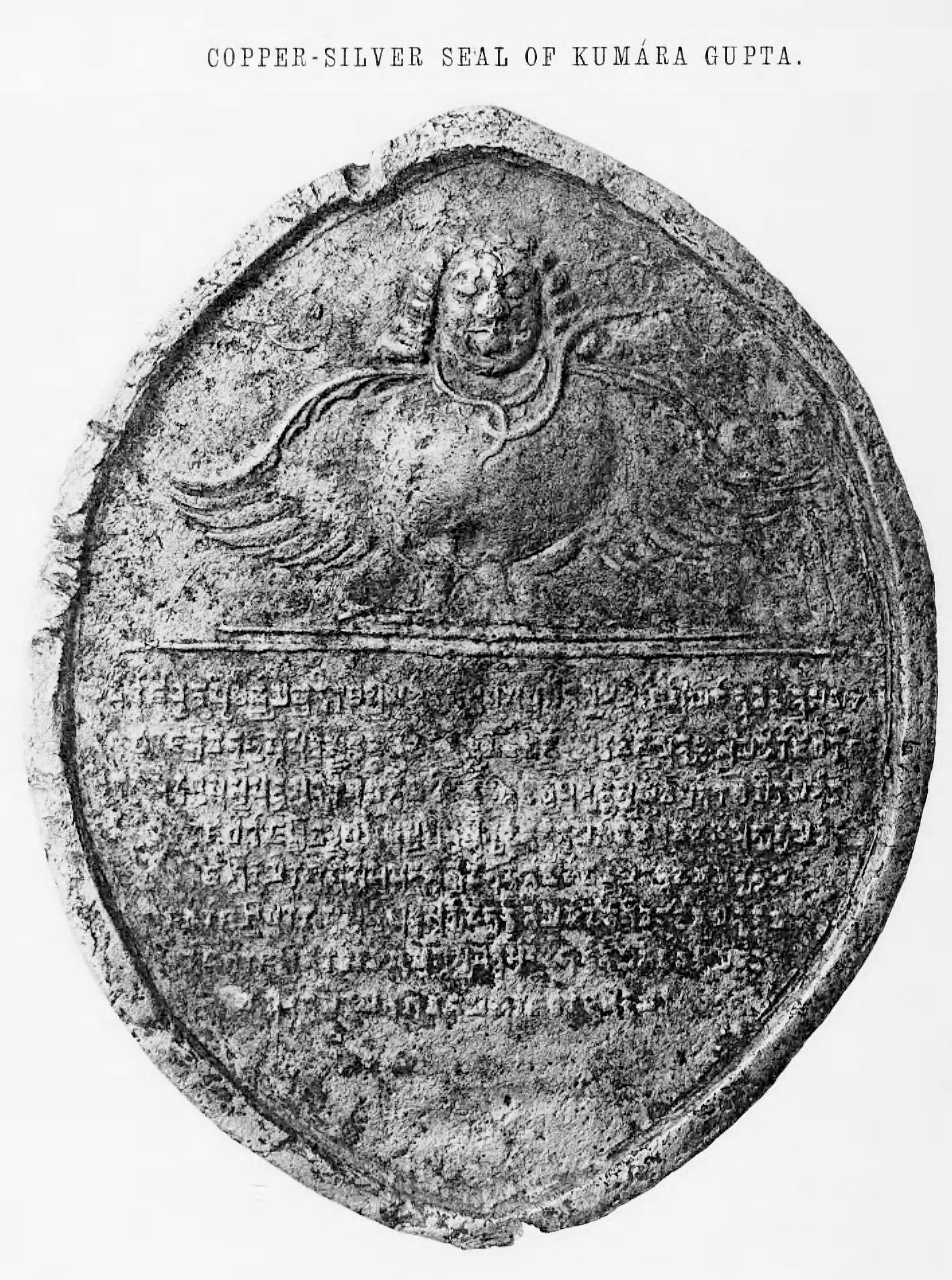
Bhitari copper-silver seal of Kumaragupta III.

Ishanavarman may have been the contemporary of Jivitagupta I, who is known to have won against his enemies whether they stood on the Himalayas or on seashore (including the Gauda Kingdom). Ishanavarman also was victorious against the Gaudas. It likely possible that both of them defeated the same foes, the Gaudas. Ishanavarman is stated to have forced them to stay at their proper realm:

'He caused the Gauḍas, living on the sea-shore, in future to remain within their proper realm.'

— translation of Hiranandi Sastri

Gopachandra was most likely the contemporary ruler of the Gaudas who ruled over a portion of West Bengal and fought against Ishanavarman and Jivitagupta I. Eventually, Gopachandra was driven back to the Deltaic region to the east of Bhāgīrathī. Jivitagupta probably fought against the independent Vanga Kingdom as well.

== Aftermath ==
=== Rise of Varmans ===
Bhutivarman's grandson, Sthitavarman (566–590), enjoyed victories over the Gauda Kingdom of Karnasuvarna and performed two aswamedha ceremonies suggests that the Kamarupa kingdom had recovered nearly in full. His son, Susthitavarman (590–600) came under the attack of Mahasenagupta of East Malwa. These back and forth invasions were a result of a system of alliances that pitted the Kamarupa kings (allied to the Maukharis) against the Gaur kings of Bengal (allied with the East Malwa kings). Susthitavarman died as the Gaur invasion was on, and his two sons, Suprathisthitavarman and Bhaskarvarman fought against an elephant force and were captured and taken to Gaur. They were able to regain their kingdom due probably to a promise of allegiance. Later near the sixth century, Bhaskara-varman of Kamarupa, repulsed Gauda forces.

=== Rise of Shashanka ===
Some historians believe that Shashanka began his career as a feudatory chief (maha samanta) under Mahasenagupta, of the Later Gupta Dynasty. And that after the death of Mahasenagupta, Shashanka drove the later Guptas and other prominent nobles out of the region and established his own kingdom with his capital at Karnasubarna. Other historians like Sailendra Nath Sen is of the opinion that Mahasenagupta - already under pressure from the Maukharis (for failing to provide adequate protection) - wouldn't have knowingly appointed Shashanka to such an important position. Middleton (2015) argues in a similar vein that Shashanka served as maha samanta to a Gauda king, possibly Jayanaga.

Whether Shashanka was a feudatory under the Maukharis or the Guptas is not known. By 605 C.E. following Mahasenagupta's death, Shashanka had established what became known as the Gauda Kingdom. From there, he issued gold coins to celebrate his triumph, and came to be addressed as Maharajadhiraja.

== Notes ==
=== Works cited ===
- Barpujari, H.K. (1990). The Comprehensive History of Assam: From the Pre-historic Times to the Twelfth Century A.D.
- Dasagupta, K.K (1960). A comprehensive history of India, vol 3, Part1. Peoples of Publishing House.
- Goyal, S.R. (1967). The history of the imperial Guptas, with a foreword by R.C. Majumdar.
- Hemchandra, Raychaudhuri (1996). Political history of ancient India : from the accession of Parikshit to the extinction of the Gupta dynasty. Oxford University Press. ISBN 978-0-19-563789-2.
- Majumdar, R.C. (1970). History and Culture of the Indian People, Volume 03, The Classical Age. Bharatiya Vidya Bhavan.
- Majumdar, Ramesh Chandra; Altekar, Anant Sadashiv (1954). Vakataka Gupta age (Circa 200-550 A.D.).
- Middleton, John (2015). World Monarchies and Dynasties. Routledge. ISBN 978-1-317-45158-7.
- Prasad, Bindeshwari Prasad (1974). Comprehensive History Of Bihar Vol.1; Pt.2.
- Schwartzberg, Joseph E. (1978). A Historical atlas of South Asia. Chicago: University of Chicago Press. ISBN 0226742210. Archived from the original on 2021-02-24.
- Sen, N. S. (1999). Ancient Indian history and civilization (Second ed.). New Age International. ISBN 978-81-224-1198-0.
- Sircar, D C (1990b), "Political History", in Barpujari, H K (ed.), The Comprehensive History of Assam, vol. I, Guwahati: Publication Board, Assam, pp. 94–171
- Thomas, F. w (1918). Epigraphia Indica Vol.14.
- Tripathi, Rama S. (1989). History of Kanauj: To the Moslem Conquest. Motilal Banarsidass Publ. ISBN 978-81-208-0404-3.
