= Assamese Brahmin =

Assamese Brahmins
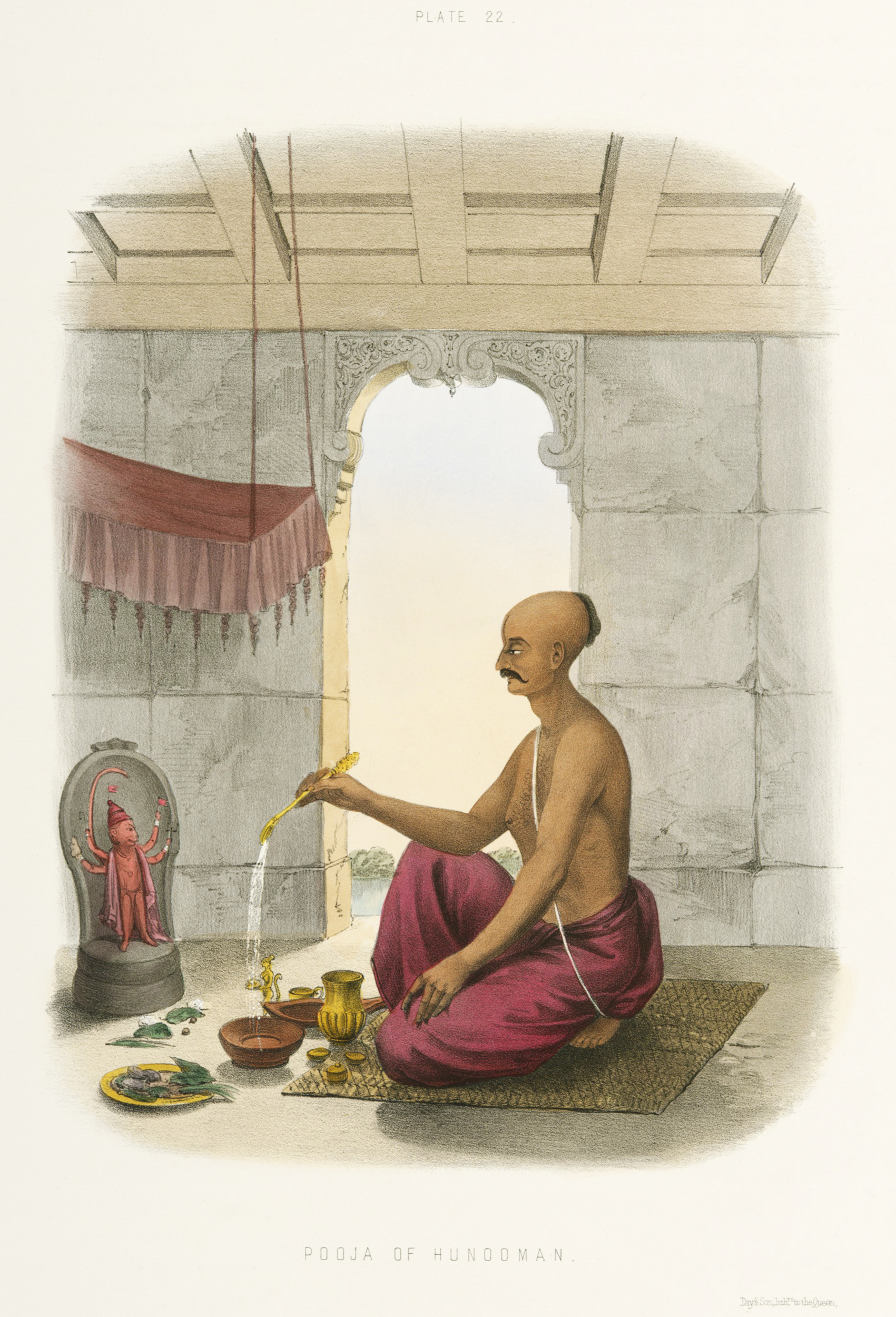
- A Brahmin priest performing daily prayers

Regions with significant populations
- Assam, India

Languages
- Assamese

Religion
- Hinduism

Related ethnic groups
- Other Brahmin groups: Bengali Brahmins, Kanyakubja Brahmin, Utkala Brahmin, Maithil Brahmin, Bahun, Saraswat Brahmins, Kulin Brahmins

Assamese Brahmins are the Brahmin community present in the Assamese society. There they have historically promoted knowledge and religion, including branches such as literature, astronomy, and philosophy. The Brahmins migrated to Assam from Videha (Mithila), Kannauj, Bengal (Gauda) and many other places.

== History ==
The earliest historical evidence of settlement of Brahmins in Assam comes from various epigraphic sources of the Varman dynasty (350–650). In the late medieval period beginning with the early 16th century, a number of Brahmins from Mithila, Benaras, Kanauj, Bengal and Puri (Srikshetra), were settled in western Assam by the Koch kings for performing Brahminical rites. During the reign of Nara Narayan (1554-1587) of the Koch dynasty, two Brahmins named Siddhantavagisa and Vidyavagisa were brought from Gauda and Siddhantavagisa was responsible for the spread of Hinduism in the Koch kingdom Even during the reign of Koch king Prannarayana (1633-1655), Brahmins were brought from Mithilia to serve in the Koch kingdom and this process was later continued by the Ahom state especially under the Tungkhungia Ahom kings with Siva Singha donating 19 out of the 48 landgrants by the Ahom kings to Brahmins. The migration of Brahmins into Assam took place from Central Himalayas as well. Most of these migration took place due to the foreign invasions in North India and on the invitation by the local rulers. Traditionally these Brahmins held the highest positions in society.

== Tradition and culture ==
=== Lagundeoni/Upanayana ===
Traditionally, the ceremony of Lagundeoni – one of the samskaras or rites of passage marking acceptance of a student by a guru, is a quite prevalent ritual within the community.

=== Death rituals ===
Brahmins of the Assam valley follow a different death ritual as opposed to the other indigenous communities in Assam. A religious rite, known as Caturthā is performed on the 4th day of a person's demise unlike Tiloni, performed on the 3rd day of person's demise by non–Brahmin indigenous communities.

== Lifestyle ==
Although in general Brahmins observe all the customary rituals, they appear usually less rigid in some of their traditional lifestyle choices, such as they may eat meat, fish, unlike their counterparts in other parts of India like the North and the South.

== Present ==
The Brahmins constitute one of the Forward classes of Assam based on the classifications of Government of India, although the recent trend on economic condition has not been very well within the community. Assam's former Chief Minister, Tarun Gogoi announced setting up of development councils for several communities in the state, including Brahmins.

== Notable people ==
Name	Portrait	Notability	References
Hem Barua (original name was Hem Chandra Sarma Barua)		Former 3 times Member of Parliament, Lok Sabha from Assam.	
Lakshminath Bezbarua			
Bijoy Chandra Bhagavati		Former Union Minister of State in Second Nehru ministry	
Gopinath Bordoloi		1st Chief Minister of Assam & 2nd Prime Minister of Assam	
Himanta Biswa Sarma		Chief Minister of Assam	
Jaimini Bhagwati		Indiam High commissioner to United Kingdom	
Phani Sarma			
Bijoya Chakravarty		Former Member of Rajya Sabha	
Zubeen Garg			

== See also ==
- Kanyakubja Brahmins
- Manipuri Brahmins
- Assamese people
- Bengali Brahmins
