= Bardhaman (disambiguation) =

Bardhaman is a city in West Bengal, India.

Bardhaman or Burdwan or Barddhaman may also refer to:

- Burdwan division, an administrative division of West Bengal, India
  - Bardhaman district, a district of West Bengal, India with the city as its capital
  - Bardhaman Sadar North subdivision, a subdivision of West Bengal, India within the above division
  - Bardhaman Sadar South subdivision, a subdivision of West Bengal, India within the above division
  - Burdwan I, community development block, West Bengal, India
  - Burdwan II, community development block, West Bengal, India
- Bardhamanbhukti, a historical region of ancient and medieval India
- Bardhaman Raj, an Indian zamindari estate that flourished from about 1657 to 1955
- Bardhaman-Durgapur (Lok Sabha constituency), Indian parliamentary constituency
- Bardhaman Purba (Lok Sabha constituency) (or Bardhaman East), Indian parliamentary constituency
- Burdwan (Lok Sabha constituency), former Indian parliamentary constituency, defunct from 2009
- Bardhaman Uttar (Vidhan Sabha constituency) (earlier called Burdwan North), an electoral constituency of the West Bengal Legislative Assembly
- Bardhaman Dakshin (Vidhan Sabha constituency) (earlier called Burdwan South), an electoral constituency of the West Bengal Legislative Assembly
- Barddhaman Junction railway station, railway Station in West Bengal, India
