= Trowulan =

District in Mojokerto Regency, Jawa Timur Province, Indonesia

- Wilwatikta
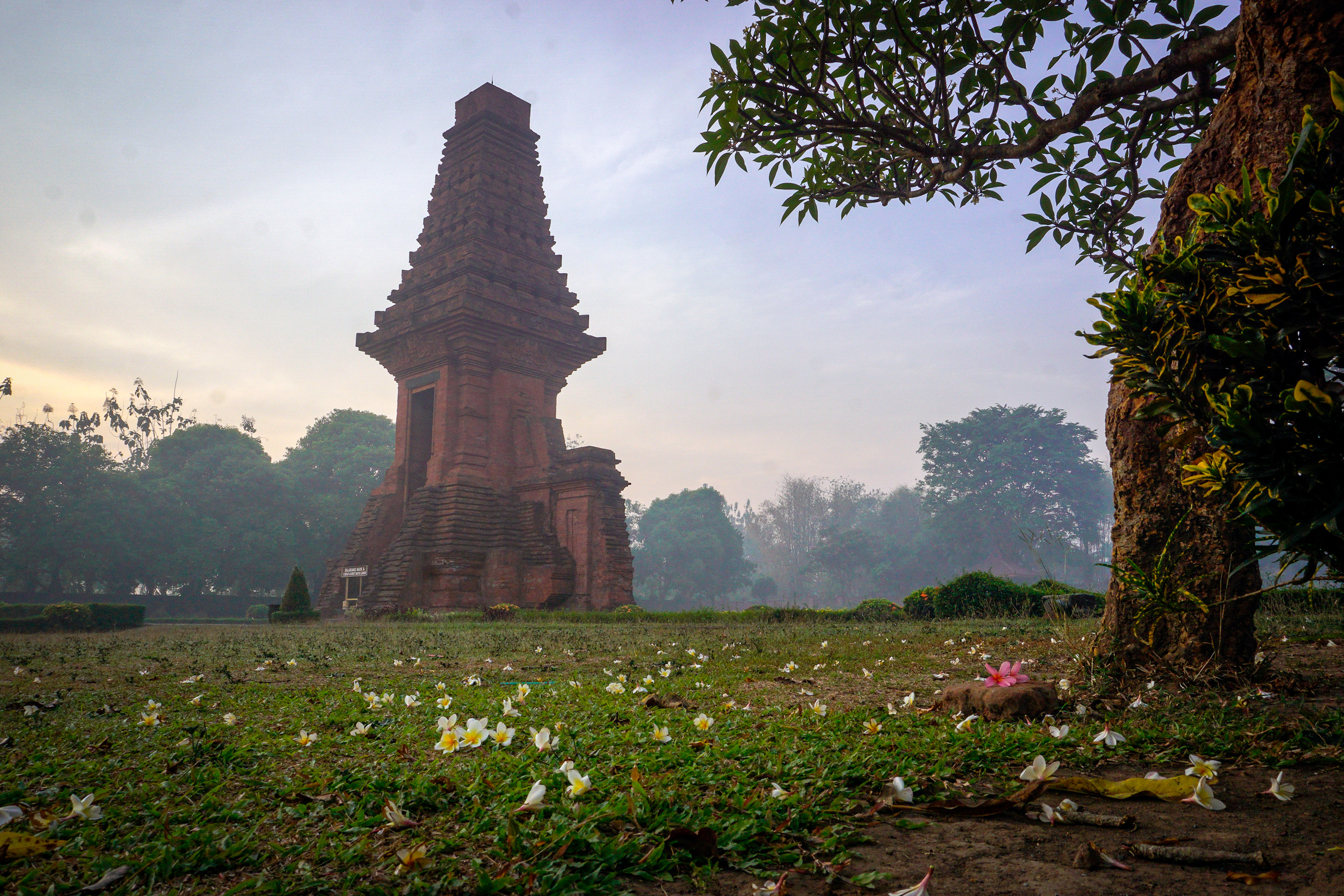
- Bajang Ratu, the elegant paduraksa-style gate at Trowulan, Mojokerto

- 7°32′30.80″S 112°23′27.54″E
- Periods: Hindu-Buddhist period
- Cultures: Majapahit
- Location: Trowulan, Mojokerto Regency, East Java
- Region: Indonesia

History
- Built: unknown; completed circa 14th–15th century

Site notes
- Architectural style: Candi
- Excavation dates: 19th to 20th century
- Archaeologists: Sir Thomas Stamford Raffles; J.W.B. Wardenaar; R.A.A. Kromodjojo Adinegoro; Henry Maclaine Pont; Willem Frederik Stutterheim
- Condition: Restored

Trowulan is an archaeological site in Trowulan Subdistrict, Mojokerto Regency, in the Indonesian province of East Java. It includes approximately 100 square kilometres and has been theorized to be the site of the eponymous capital city of the Majapahit Empire, which is described by Mpu Prapanca in the 14th-century poem Nagarakretagama and in a 15th-century Chinese source. When it was the capital of the Majapahit Empire, the city was known as Majapahit or Wilwatikta, which the empire derives its name from. It was razed during the invasion of Girindrawardhana to defeat Kertabhumi in 1478. After this event Majapahit's capital was moved to Daha (Kediri). The Trowulan Museum includes a collection of artifacts.

The Nagarakretagama contains poetic descriptions of the palace of Majapahit and its surroundings but is limited to the royal and religious sectors. Some of the details are vague, so scholars who have tried to compile a plan of the capital have come to different conclusions.

Older research at Trowulan has concentrated on monumental remains: temples, tombs, and a bathing place. Archaeological surveys and excavations have recently found the remains of industrial, commercial, and religious activity, habitation areas, water supply systems, and water canals all of which are evidence of dense population during the 14th to 15th centuries. In October 2009, the Ministry of Culture and Tourism of Indonesia submitted Trowulan to the UNESCO World Heritage list.

== Descriptions in contemporary sources ==
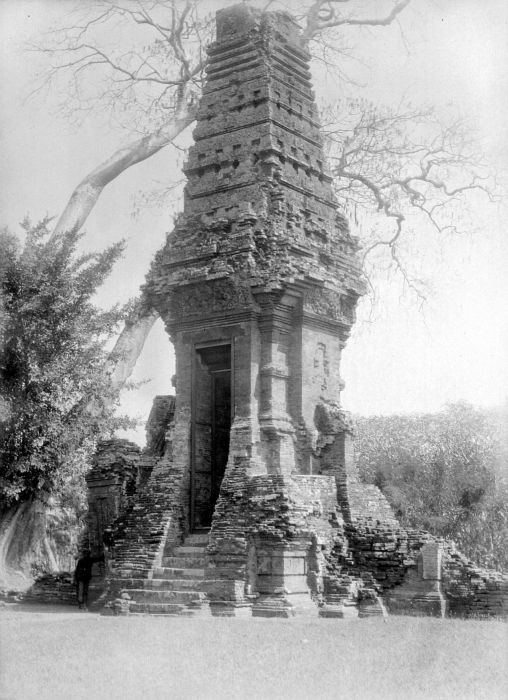
Bajang Ratu in 1929, before restoration

According to the account of Prapanca in the Nagarakretagama poem, the royal compound was surrounded by a thick, high wall of red brick. Nearby was the fortified guard post. Huge doors of decorated iron led to the main gate into the palace which was located in the north wall. Outside the north gate was a long building where courtiers met once a year, a marketplace, and a sacred crossroads. Just inside the north gate was a courtyard containing religious buildings. On the eastern side of this courtyard were pavilions surrounded by canals where people bathed. At the south end, a gate led to rows of houses set on terraces in which palace servants lived. Another gate led to a third courtyard crowded with houses and a great hall for those waiting to be admitted into the ruler's presence. The king's quarters, which lay to the west of this courtyard, had pavilions on decorated red brick bases, ornately carved wooden pillars, and a roof decorated with clay ornaments. Outside the palace were quarters for Shiva priests, Buddhists, and other members of the nobility. Further away, and separated from the palace by open fields, were more royal compounds, including that of the chief minister Gajah Mada. Here Prapanca's descriptions end.

A 15th-century Chinese source describes the palace as clean and well-kept. It was said to have been enclosed within a brick wall more than 10 metres high and with a double gate. The houses inside were built on pillars and were 10–13 metres high, with wooden floors covered with fine mats on which people sat. Roofs were made from wooden shingles and the dwellings of the common people were roofed with straw.

A book on Majapahit court etiquette defines the capital as 'All where one can go out without passing through paddy fields.' Temple reliefs from Majapahit do not depict urban scenes, but some contain sketches of settlements indicated as pavilions enclosed within walls. The word 'kuwu' in Nagarakretagama seems to refer to the settlement units consisting of a group of buildings surrounded by a wall, in which a large number of people lived under the control of a nobleman. This pattern characterised the 16th-century coastal cities of Java described by early European visitors, and Majapahit's capital was probably composed of such units.

== Rediscovery ==
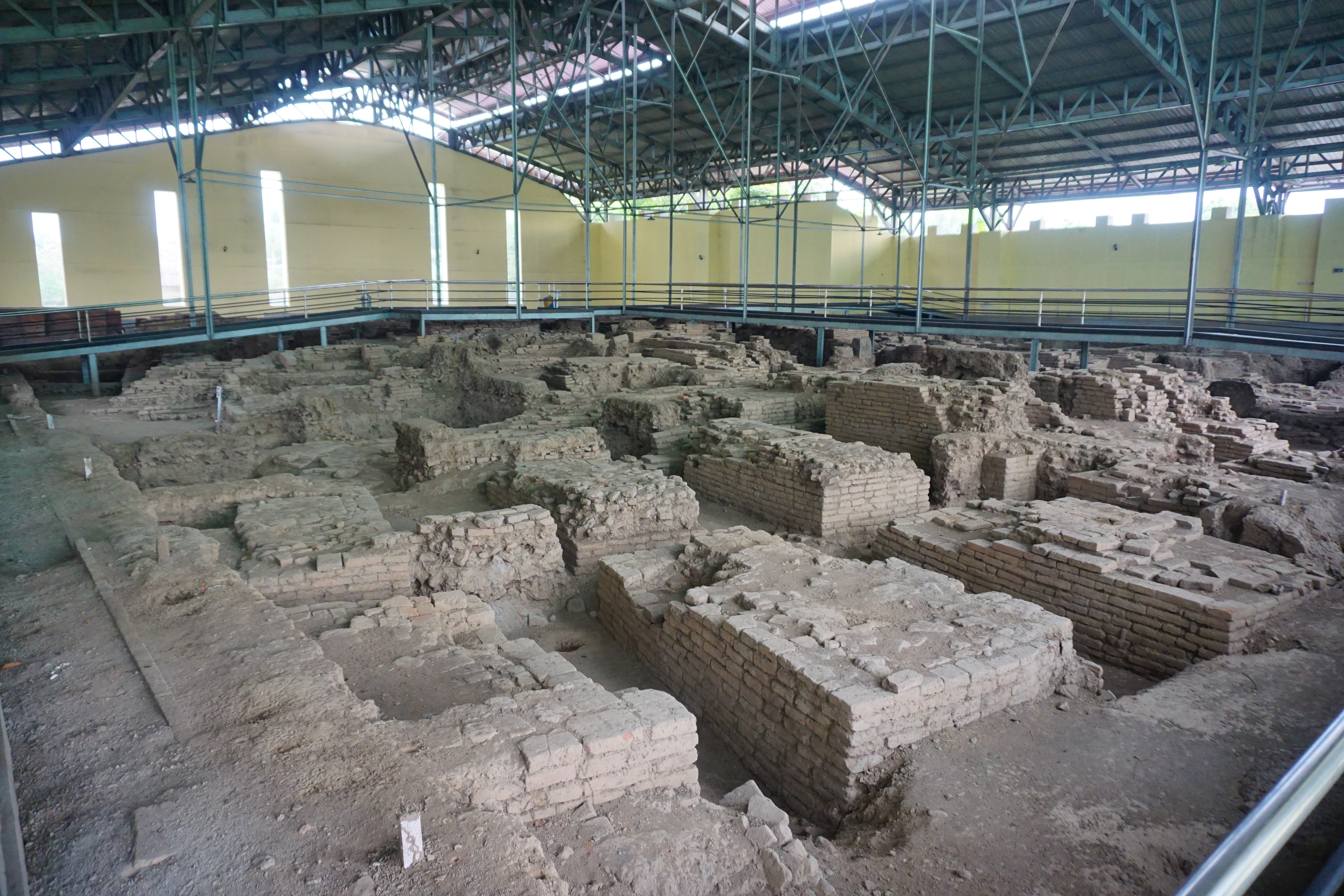
Sumur Upas excavation site, Trowulan, Mojokerto.

The ancient city ruins at Trowulan had been rediscovered by the 19th century. Sir Thomas Stamford Raffles, Lieutenant-Governor of British Java, Governor-General of Bencoolen from 1811 until 1816 and an indefatigable enthusiast for the island's history, reported the existence of 'ruins of temples.... scattered about the country for many miles'. Much of the region was blanketed with dense teak forest at that time, making detailed survey impossible. Nonetheless, Raffles was so impressed by what he saw that he later referred to Trowulan as 'this pride of Java'.

== Archaeological sites ==
Most of the archaeological relics discovered in Trowulan and its vicinity are stored and displayed in the Trowulan Museum, located on the west side of Segaran Pool. Excavations in and around Trowulan have shown that parts of the old settlement still lie buried under several metres of mud and volcanic debris, a result of the frequent eruptions of nearby Mount Kelud, as well as frequent flooding of the Brantas River. Several archaeological ruins lie scattered around Trowulan village. Several are quite damaged, while others have undergone reconstruction. Most are constructed of red brick.

=== Tikus Temple ===
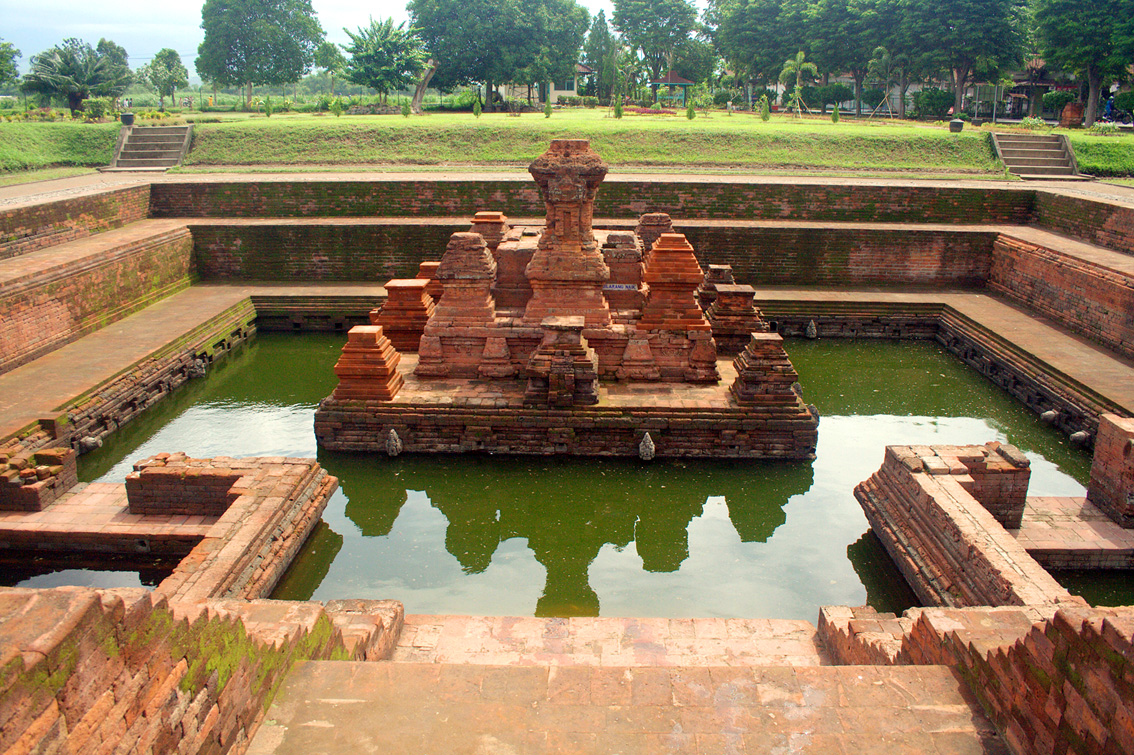
Candi Tikus bathing place

Tikus Temple (lit. 'Rat temple') is a ritual bathing pool (petirtaan) which is perhaps the most exciting recent archaeological finding at Trowulan. Tikus Temple means 'rat temple', the name given to the discovery in 1914 because the site appeared during the excavation to be a rat-breeding enclosure. Restored to its present condition in 1985 and 1989, this complex of red brick takes the form of a sunken, rectangular basin, into which a flight of steps descends on the northern side. The principal structure, which projects from the southern wall of the basin, was modelled on the legendary Mount Mahameru. No longer complete, it consisted of terraced foundations, upon which would have rested a concentric arrangement of 'turrets' surrounding the highest peak of the building.

Not far from Tikus Temple in the Keraton hamlet stands the recently restored gateway of "Bajang Ratu", an elegant red-brick paduraksa gate dating from the mid-14th century. The form of structure is tall and slender, rising to a height of 16.5 metres and displaying intricate relief decoration, especially on the roof section. The gate is adorned with bas reliefs depicting the story of Sri Tanjung and Ramayana. Bajang Ratu in Javanese means 'dwarf or defect monarch'. Folk tradition links the gate with Jayanegara, the second Majapahit king, the successor to Kertarajasa Jayawarddhana, founder of the Majapahit Empire. According to tradition, Jayanegara fell from the gate as a child, causing defects to his body. The name probably also means 'little monarch', as Jayanegara ascended to the throne at a young age. Historian connects this gate with Çrenggapura (Çri Ranggapura) or Kapopongan of Antawulan (Trowulan), the shrine mentioned in Nagarakertagama as the dharma place (holy compound) dedicated to King Jayanegara during his death on 1328.

=== Wringin Lawang ===
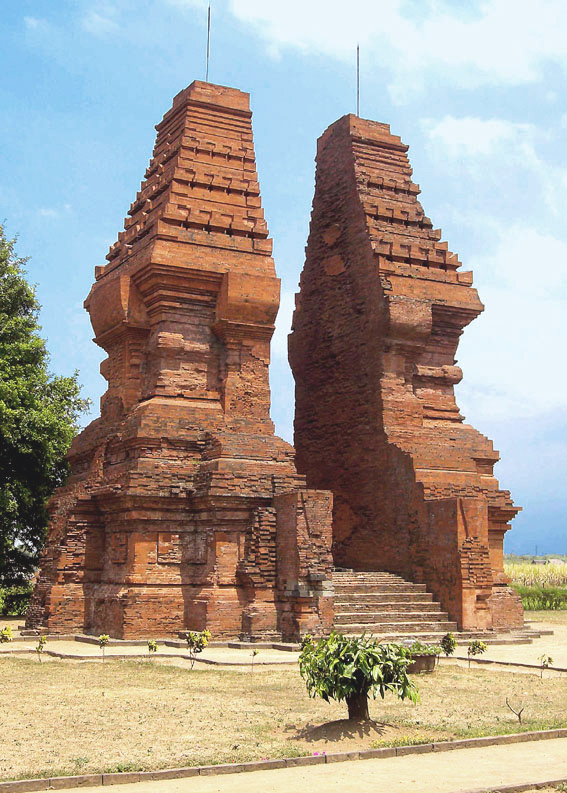
Wringin Lawang, the gate at Trowulan, Mojokerto

Wringin Lawang is located a short distance south of Indonesian National Route 15 at Jatipasar village. The name in Javanese means 'The Banyan Tree Gate'. The grand gate portals are made from red brick, with a base of 13 x 11 metres and a height of 15.5 metres, and date from the 14th century. The gate is of the 'candi bentar' or split gateway type, a structure that may have appeared during the Majapahit era. It is one of the oldest and the largest surviving 'Candi Bentar' dated from the Majapahit era. The 'Candi Bentar' took the shape of a typical Majapahit temple structure – consisting of three parts; foot, body, and tall roof – evenly split into two mirroring structures to make a passage in the centre for people to walk through. This type of split gate has no doors and provides no real defensive purpose but narrowing the passage. It probably only served the ceremonial and aesthetic purpose, to create a sense of grandeur, before entering the next compound. Most historians agree that this structure is the gate of an important compound in the Majapahit capital. Speculations concerning the original function of this majestic gateway have led to various suggestions, a popular one being that it was the entrance to the residence of Gajah Mada.

=== Brahu Temple ===
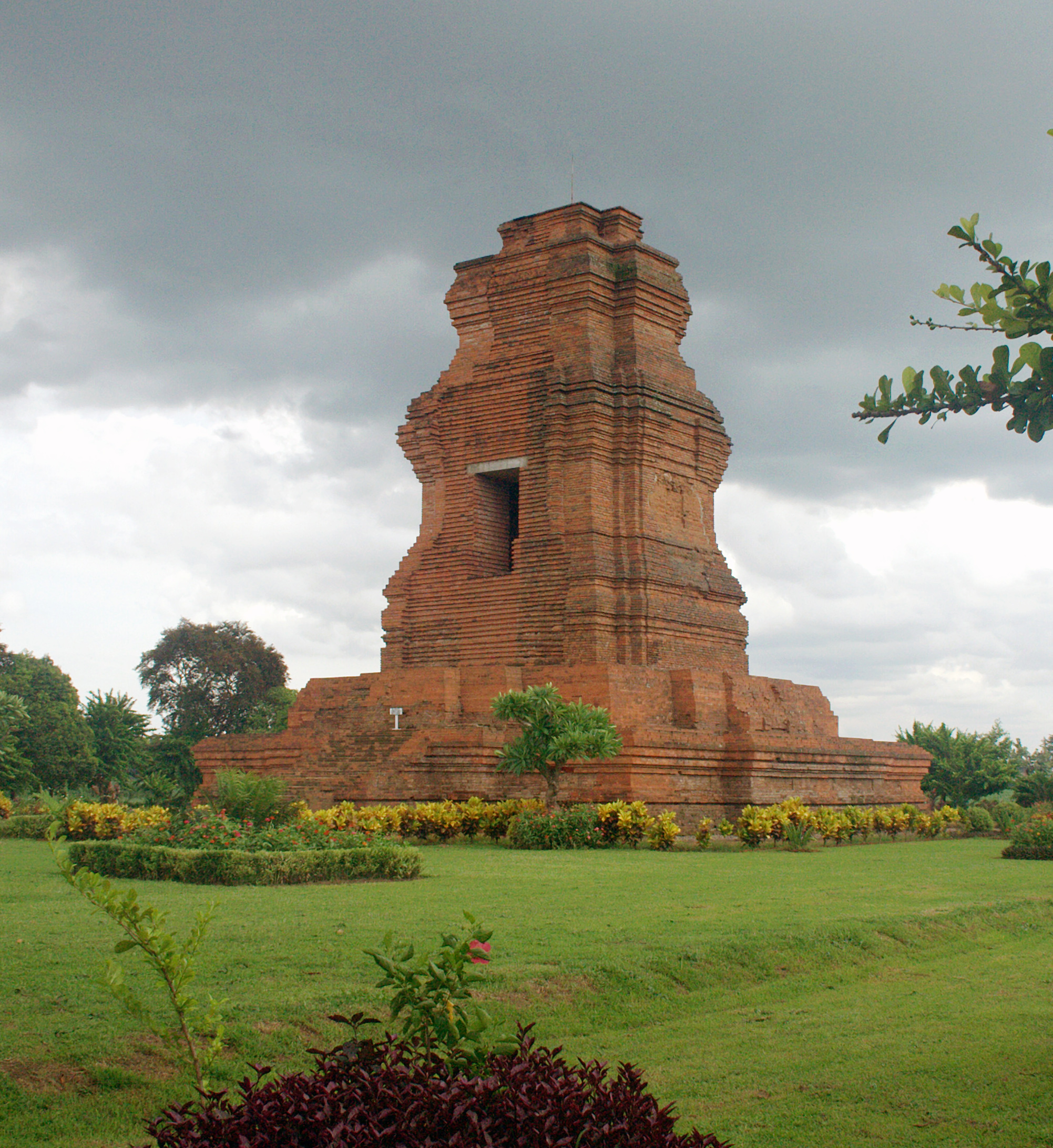
Brahu temple

Brahu Temple in the Bejijong village is the sole surviving structure of what was once a cluster of historic buildings. According to popular folk belief, it was in the vicinity of Brahu Temple that the cremation ceremonies for the first four Majapahit rulers were carried out. This tradition, while difficult to prove, is supported in part by material evidence, which suggests that the monument once served as a royal mortuary shrine. The royal personage to whom the building was dedicated remains unclear. The ruin of Candi Gentong lies nearby.

=== Segaran Pool ===
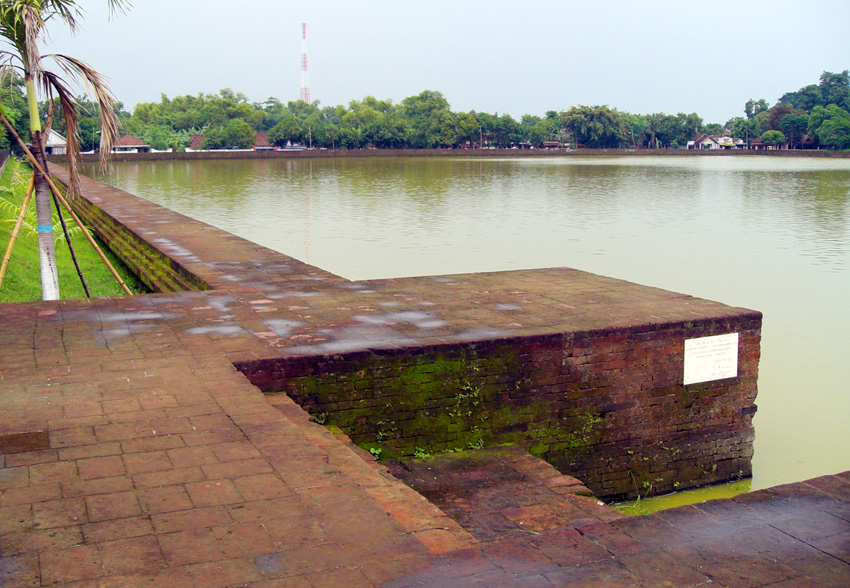
Segaran pool

Segaran Pool is a large rectangular pool 800 x 500 metres in size. The name Segaran originated from the word 'segara' in Javanese which means 'sea', probably based on the local suggestion that the large pool is the miniature of the sea. Surrounding the water basin is a rectangular wall made of red brick. The brick pool structure was discovered in 1926 by Henri Maclaine Pont; at that time the pool was covered in dirt and mud. Reconstruction took place some years later and now the Segaran pool functions as a recreational pool and fishing pond. The brick structure originated from the 14th–15th-century Majapahit era. The actual function of the pool is unknown. A study suggested that the pool probably served various functions, but mainly as the city reservoir, the source of freshwater essential for the high-density urban area, especially during the dry season. Another popular local belief is that the pool was used as the bathing place and as a swimming pool to train Majapahit troops, and as a recreational pool for Majapahit royalty to entertain envoys and guests. The 46,875-square meter pool was built slightly higher than its surroundings and is currently used to irrigate paddy fields adjacent to the pool.

=== Other sites ===
The Islamic tomb of Champa Princess is believed to be the tomb of a Majapahit king's consort. According to local traditions, she is said to have married one of the last of the Majapahit kings and to have converted him to Islam before she died in 1448.

Near the northeast edge of Kolam Segaran lies the ruin of Menak Jingga Temple. The structure is now ruined and stones scattered around the vicinity with the base still lies buried underground. Excavation still on the progress. The structure is made from carved andesite stone on the outer layer with red brick in the inner layer. The most exciting feature of this structure is the parts contained ornaments (probably roof part) identified as Qilin, a Chinese mythical creature. This might suggest a strong cultural relationship with China especially during Ming Dynasty. The local tradition linked this site with the pavilion of Queen Kencana Wungu, the Majapahit queen from the tales of Damarwulan and Menak Jingga.

At Umpak stones form the base for wooden pillars, which were probably part of a wooden building. The organic material has decayed and only the stone base remains.

In the Troloyo hamlet, numerous Islamic tombstones have been discovered, the majority of which date from between 1350 and 1478. These finds confirm not only that a Muslim community was well established in Java by the mid 14th century, but also that the religion was officially acknowledged and practiced within the royal capital itself. People believe that Troloyo also contains the tomb of Raden Wijaya, and they use to make a pilgrim every Legi Friday.

Other important ruins include:

- Balong Bunder
- Pendopo Agung
- Gold working and bronzeworking sites
- Nglinguk
- Candi Kedaton
- Sentonorejo
- Candi Sitinggil

== Houses ==
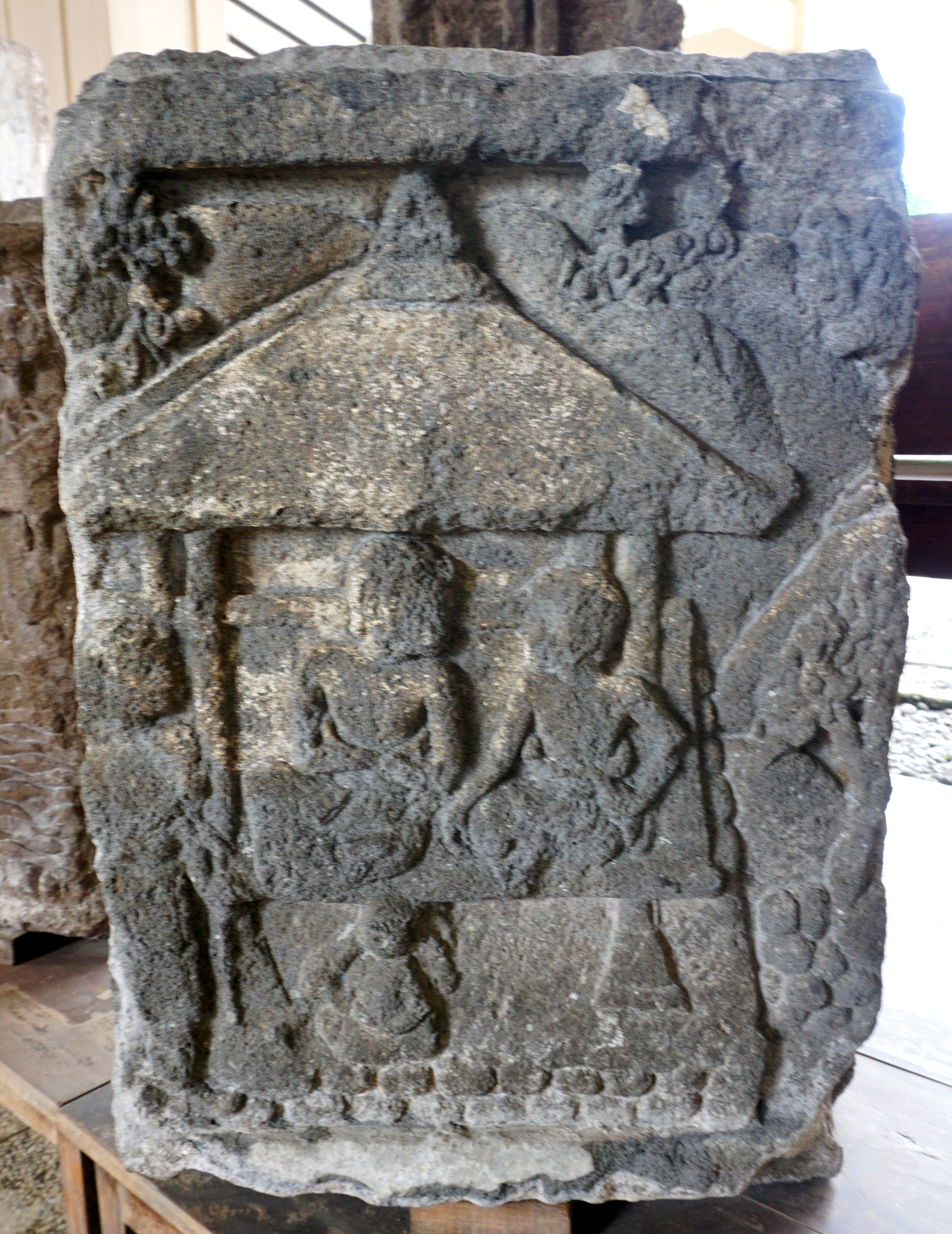
Bas relief of Trowulan ruins, showing a couple at home, Mojopahit Museum.

Archaeological excavations have revealed brick floors and the walls of some dwellings. In some cases, two or even three layers of such buildings are superimposed. These dwellings were equipped with wells and drains. Traces of a large reservoir and wells lined with brick or clay have also been located.

== Industries ==
Many pieces of gold jewellery from this period have been discovered in East Java. Although Java lacks significant gold resources, imports from Sumatra, Borneo, and Sulawesi made it possible for many goldsmiths to find work in Java.

One hamlet of Trowulan is still called Kemasan, from the word mas, meaning 'gold'. Gold ornaments have been discovered near this area, as well as the tools that were used for working the gold. Small clay cups might have been used for melting gold for use in lost wax casting. Bronze anvils and flat circular stones with three legs may have been used as work surfaces for chiseling and hammering metals. A large number of clay crucibles for melting bronze have been excavated at Pakis village, in the southern part of the site. Some of the bronze was used to cast uang gobog, large coins or amulets, in stone moulds. Other metal objects include ornate bronze lamps, water containers, bells and other items probably used in religious ceremonies, and instruments usually called 'slit drums'. Similar objects made of wood or bamboo are still found in Javanese and Balinese villages. Many iron tools were used, but most were probably imported, as Java has little iron ore.

== Money and market ==
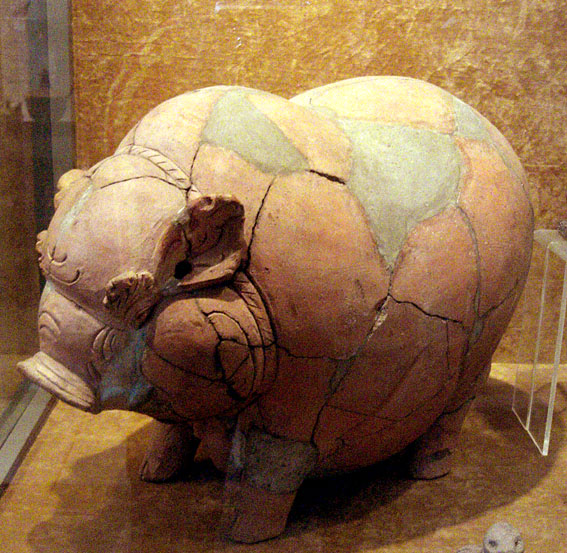
Majapahit terracotta piggy bank, 14th–15th century Trowulan, East Java. (Collection of the National Museum of Indonesia, Jakarta)

The Nawanatya mentions a court official whose duty was to protect the markets. 'Eight thousand cash every day from the markets is the share' received by this official. The 'cash' referred to in this text is Chinese bronze coins which became Majapahit's official currency in around 1300, replacing gold and silver currency which had been in use for centuries. Chinese coins were apparently preferable because they were available in small denominations, suitable for use in markets. This change suggests that economic life in Trowulan was marked by specialized occupations, wages, and the acquisition of most daily needs by purchase. Important evidence for the 14th-century Javanese perception of money comes in the form of clay piggy banks with slits in their backs large enough to admit a coin. The association of pig figurines and containers for saving money is obvious; in present Javanese and Indonesian, the word 'celengan' means 'piggy bank', 'money box', or 'saving', while the root word 'celeng' itself means boar or pig. Coin containers in other shapes have also been found.

== Pottery ==
Significant numbers of Majapahit Terracotta artefacts were commonly discovered in Trowulan. The craft of pottery was an important activity. Most potteries was intended for domestic use in cooking and storage, with decorations limited to stripes of red paint. Lamps for coconut oil are another common find. The finest pottery takes the form of vessels, such as water ewers (kendi), with thin-walled bodies, graceful shapes, and a glossy red surface created by burnishing. These must have been made by full-time professional potters. Water containers were one of the Majapahit urban potter's main products and many large round water jars have been found. Square water 'boxes' were decorated with aquatic motifs or other scenery. Terracotta figurines were produced in large quantities, representing many subjects: gods, humans, animals, buildings, and scenes. Their function is unknown; they may have served multiple purposes. Some may have been used in religious shrines attached to dwellings, as in modern Bali. Examples of these terracottas in the form of miniature buildings and animals have been found at shrines on Mount Penanggungan. Others, such as humorous depictions of foreigners, may simply have been meant as toys for children.

== The Majapahit Park ==
During the last half-year of 2008, the Indonesian government sponsored a massive exploration on the site that is believed to be the place where the palace of Majapahit once stood. Jero Wacik, the Indonesian Minister of Culture and Tourism stated that the Majapahit Park would be built on the site and completed as early as 2009, in order to prevent further damage caused by home-made brick industries that develop on the surrounding area. Majapahit Park would expand the existing Trowulan Museum and provide a Majapahit themed education and recreation park.

Nevertheless, the project leaves huge attention to some historians, since constructing the park's foundation in Segaran site located in the south side of Trowulan Museum will inevitably damage the site itself. Ancient bricks and wells which are historically valuable were found scattered on the site. The government then argued that the method they were applying were less destructive since the digging method was used instead of drilling. Since then the construction of Majapahit Park has been halted, postponed for further study of the impact on the archaeological site.

== See also ==
- Majapahit Empire
- Srivijaya archaeological park
- Majapahit Museum
- Borobudur archaeological park
- Indonesian architecture
- Candi of Indonesia
