= Trowulan (district) =

District in Mojokerto Regency, East Java Province, Indonesia

Coordinates: 7.5420°S 112.3910°E

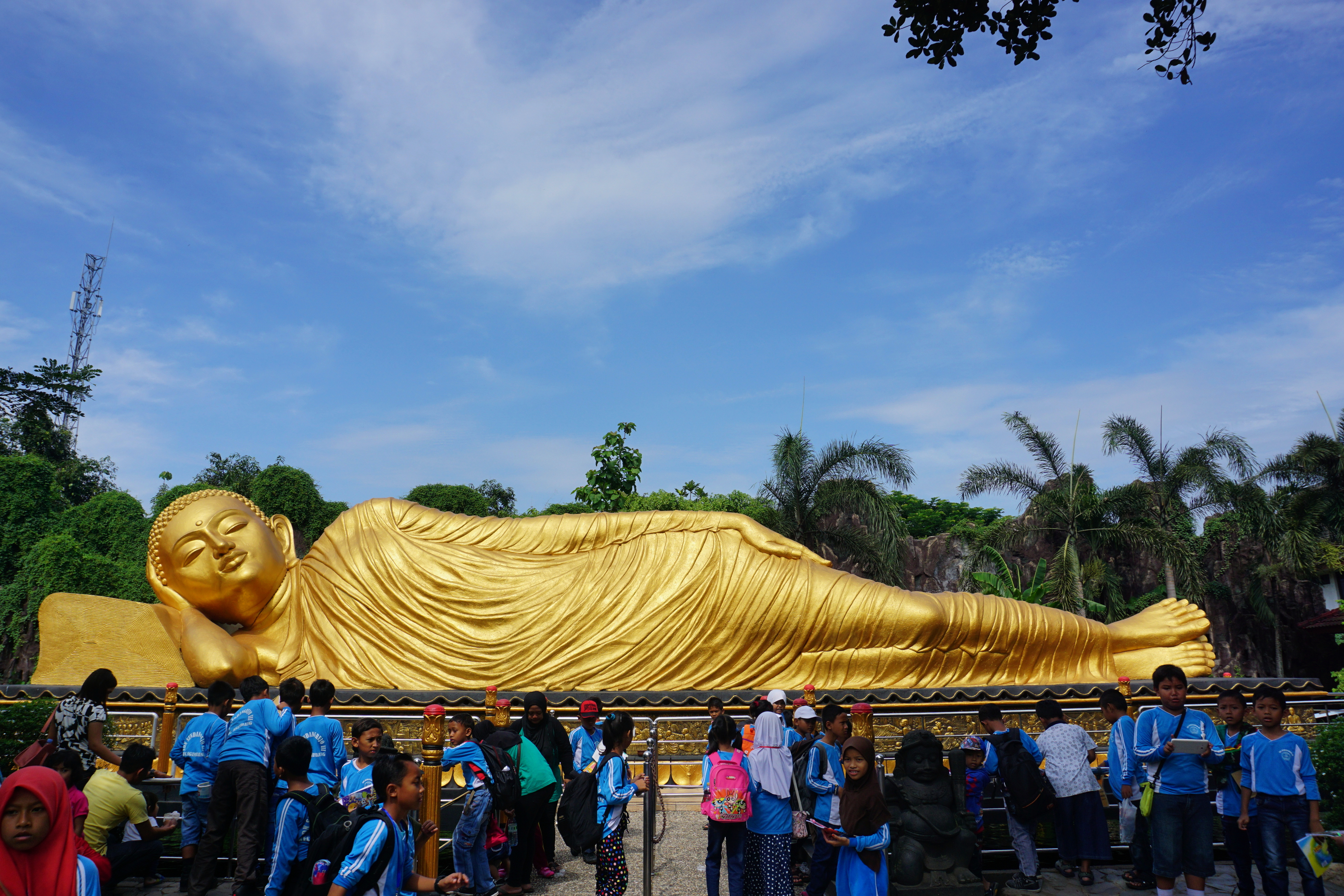
Reclining Buddha in Trowulan

Trowulan is a subdistrict in the Mojokerto Regency of Indonesia's province of East Java. It is home to the Trowulan archaeological site and the Trowulan Museum.
