= Dandabhukti =

Territory of ancient Bengal

Coordinates: 22°15′N 87°39′E

Dandabhukti (Bengali: দণ্ডভুক্তি) was an ancient and medieval territory located between the two rivers, Dwarakeswar and Subarnarekha, and situated in the Rarh region of the ancient Bengal. It covered the present-day districts of Purba Medinipur, Jhargram district and southern part of Paschim Medinipur in West Bengal, and Balasore district in Odisha, India.

== History ==
=== Early history ===
The ancient Rarh region was divided into several smaller territories - Kankagrambhukti, Bardhamanbhukti, and Dandabhukti, as part of the Gupta Empire. After the fall of Guptas rule in Bengal, Dandabhukukti and Bardhamanbhukti regions became part of the independent Kingdom of Vanga which emerged in early 500s.

=== Rule under Shashanka ===
Shashanka, the Gauda king, conquered Dandabhukti, the Utkala kingdom, and the Kangoda kingdom. In the first half of the seventh century A.D., Dandabhukti or Dandabhuktimandala rose into prominence when it was governed by Mahapratihara Shubhakirti, a vassal of Shashanka, King of Dagau. Shashanka gave the administration of Dandabhuktimandala and Utkala to Samanta-maharaja Somadatta, who was the subordinate of Shashanka. A few epigraphic records, including Shashanka's duo Midnapur copperplates, the Irda copperplates of Kamboja ruler of Bengal, and Rajendra Chola's Tirumulai engraving, all specify Dandabhukti as a distinct geopolitical region. The region was mentioned in the Ramcharita of Sandhyakar Nandi, and its ruler Jayasimha was described as a feudatory of Ramapala, the Pala ruler. The Kamboja dynasty is believed to have conquered the Bardhamanbhukti and Dandabhukti regions by exploiting the weakness of the Pala rulers in Bengal.

=== Dharmapala and conquering by the Cholas ===
Dharmapala, the ruler of the Dandabhukti region who was banished from his lands by Rajendra Chola's quelling armed force, as recorded by the Tirumulai engraving (1021-24 A.D.), is thought to have belonged to the same line as the Kamboja Gaudapatis. The Tirumalai inscription depicts the division of North Rarh and South Rarh. Dandabhukti was classified under the South Rarh. However, the topographic extent of Dandabhukti is not clear. Based on the available evidence, Dandabhukti can be deduced to incorporate the southwestern part of Bengal, specifically the south and southwest areas of contemporary Midnapur District in West Bengal and parts of Balasore District in Orissa. Epigraphic records belonging to the reign of Shashanka exhibit that Dandabhukti and Utkala were two distinct geographical entities, with Dandabhukti being present-day southwest Midnapur in West Bengal. But during Gopachandra's reign, Dandabhukti appears to have encompassed the territory north of the Suvarnarekha River in Balasore district as well as the area around Dantan today in Midnapur district. The Dandabhukti Mandala was associated with the North-Toshali, and it incorporated the districts of Tamala-Khanda and Daksina-Khanda, as evident from the two copper plate grants to a Bhaumakara queen. These two terrains are identified with Tamluk and Dakinmal, respectively, and they both were mentioned as Parganas in the Mughal records for the Midnapur region. From different available sources, it turns out that the location of modern Dandabhukti was known as Danda, which is the headquarters of the Bhukti or mandala of unidentified origin. Under the reign of the Kamboja rulers of Dandabhukti Mandala, the mentioned area was included in the Bardhamanbhukti, according to the Irda Copperplate (10th Century A.D.). Later, some parts of Dandabhukti were included in the territory of Utkal kings. Danda in Oriya means path. There was an ancient path from Rarh (or possibly from Magadha) to Kalinga. The voyage of Rajendra Chola (11th century A.D.) to Dandabhukti through Orissa reveals the presence of interstate roads connecting the Bastar area of Madhya Pradesh with Orissa and Bengal. His army marched through Chitrakuta and passed through Binika, Sonepur in Bolangir district and following the road through eastern Keonjhar and Western Mayurbhanj, reached Dandabhukti. The territory may have acquired its name from the path. Chaitanyadeva is said to have traversed this path from Nabadwipdham (Nadia) to Nilaachala Puri during the sultanate period. Dandabhukti served as a connecting point between Odisha and Bengal (Radha/Rarh). The name of the contemporary locality of Dantan in the territory of Paschim Midnapur bears the legacy of Dandabhukti.
