= Gopachandra =

Founder and an important ruler of the independent Vanga Kingdom in ancient Bengal

Mahārādhirāja Gopachandra
- 525–543
- Capital: Probably Kotalipara (present-day Gopalganj District, Dhaka Division, Bangladesh)
- Common languages: Gaudi Prakrit
- Religion: Hinduism
- Government: Monarchy
- Maharajadhiraja
  - 525–543: Gopachandra
  - 543–557: Samacharadeva
  - 557–575: Dharmaditya
- History
  - Establishment: 525
  - Dissolution: 543
Preceded by	Succeeded by
Gupta Empire	Gauda Kingdom

Maharajadhiraja Gopachandra was the founder and an important ruler of the independent Vanga Kingdom in ancient Bengal. Around 525 CE, following the decline of the Gupta Empire in Bengal, he established the independent Vanga Kingdom. Along with Gopachandra, the other rulers of the Vanga kingdom also assumed the title of Mahārādhirāja, which marked their sovereignty and power.

== History ==
As Gupta rule in Bengal weakened, king Gopachandra established an independent Vanga Kingdom during the first half of the 6th century, encompassing the eastern and southern parts of Bengal. Several copperplate inscriptions of the independent Vanga rulers have been discovered in different parts of Bengal, of which the largest number, five, have been found in the Greater Faridpur region. Kotalipara in the undivided Faridpur district is considered to have been the capital of the Vanga Kingdom.

Two additional copperplate inscriptions have been discovered at Mallasarul in Bardhaman and Jayrampur in Balasore, Odisha, near Medinipur. Numerous gold coins belonging to Maharaja Gopachandra and other Vanga rulers have also been discovered at present-day Savar in Dhaka and Mainamati in Cumilla.

According to archaeological evidence, the independent Vanga Kingdom extended from Cumilla Division in the east to Bardhaman in the west. In the south, it also included Dandabhukti and parts of present-day Balasore in Odisha, which were under the authority of Maharaja Gopachandra. However, it is believed that North Bengal was still under Gupta control at that time. Later, the independent Kingdom of Gauda in northern and western parts of Bengal was established after the decline of Gupta kingdom.

The copperplate inscriptions of King Gopachandra also mention two administrative provinces named Navyavyakashika (present-day Faridpur and Barisal) and Bardhamanbhukti (present-day southern West Bengal).
