= Majapahit Terracotta =

Terracotta art from Majapahit-era Java

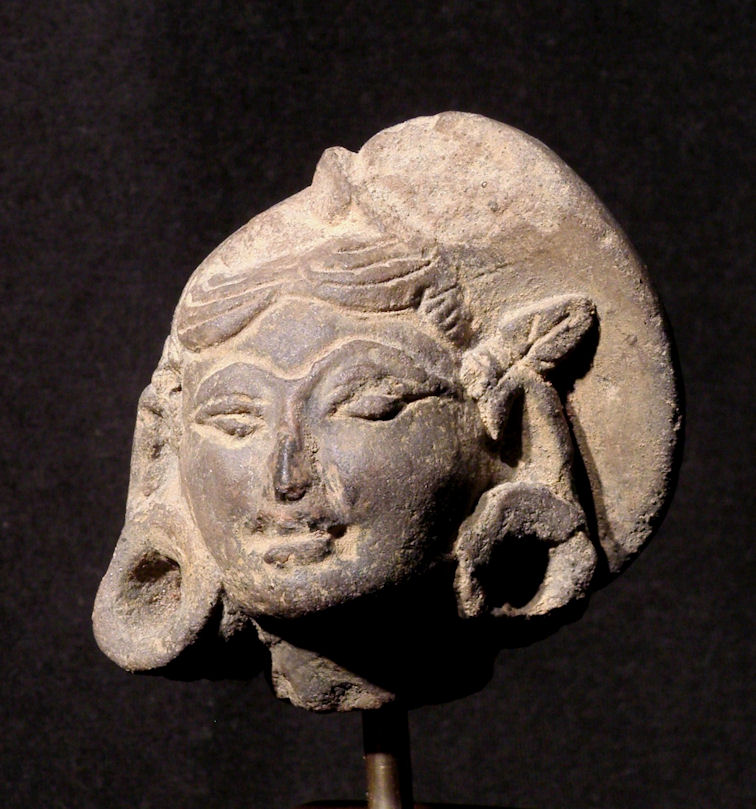
Majapahit head; 13th–15th century; terracotta; 6 x 6 x 4.2 cm. Although simply modeled, this head is very expressive and, although it is small (6 cm) the details can clearly be seen. She wears a head band and her hair, piled on the left is also tied bt the scarf. There is a leaf over her right ear. Her ear rings are large and tubular

Majapahit Terracotta is the terracotta art and craft dated from Majapahit era circa 13th to 15th century. Significant terracotta earthenware artifacts from this period were discovered in Trowulan, East Java.

Over the years many terracotta sculptures and artifacts have been discovered as a result of agricultural activities, building roads etc. Some of these finds were brought together in the Trowulan Museum before World War II, but in the subsequent years much of this collection has been lost. After the war, many of the pieces has been unearthed as the result of digging for gold. After the crops have been harvested the farmers lease their land to diggers who dig pits panning the alluvial soil for gold. The terracottas are an incidental find, often bearing the mark of the digging implement.

Today, the Trowulan Museum and the National Museum of Indonesia host large collections of Majapahit terracotta art.

== Method ==
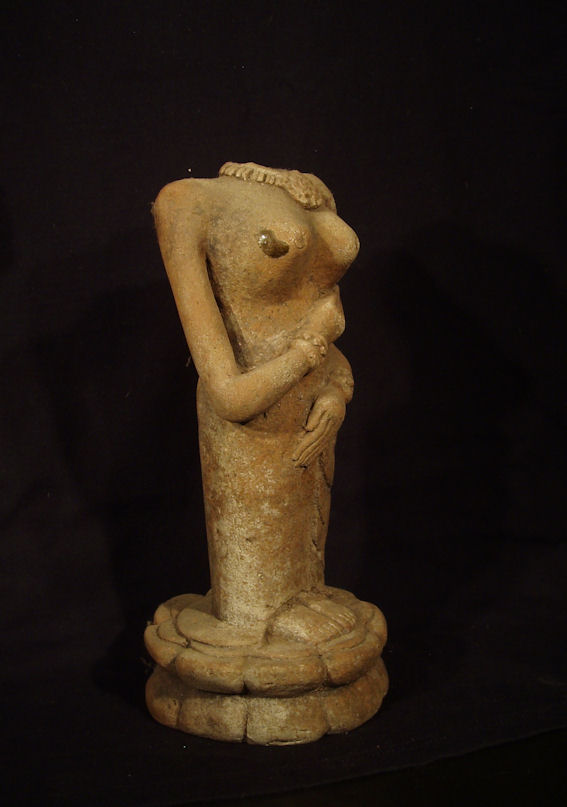
High fired figurine with a glaze drip on her breast

The word terracotta derives from the Latin word meaning burnt earth. Nowadays the word refers to all unglazed red earthenware objects. Much of the archeological studies of the area have focused on the reconstructions of the ruins. So far, in East Java no kilns have been found and most of the objects are relatively low fired, suggesting that the craftsmen worked by the earthenware method. They probably worked in a way similar to that being used today in Kasongan, near Yogyakarta and the one in Bali, where the figurines are sun dried. Then rice husks and straw heaped over them and set on fire. To attain a harder object the firing is repeated. So far no kilns that would have allowed higher temperatures to be reached have been discovered. However, there is some evidence that there may have been kilns from one figurine that is of a stone ware and has a glaze drip on the breast.

== Artifacts ==
=== Containers ===
Containers in various sizes and shapes have been discovered in Trowulan. The containers probably used for various purposes, from water container to grain container. From large jar to box shaped water container. The typical kendi, a bulbous and tall neck water vessel with breast-like spout, similar to those still in use today have been found from Majapahit period sites.

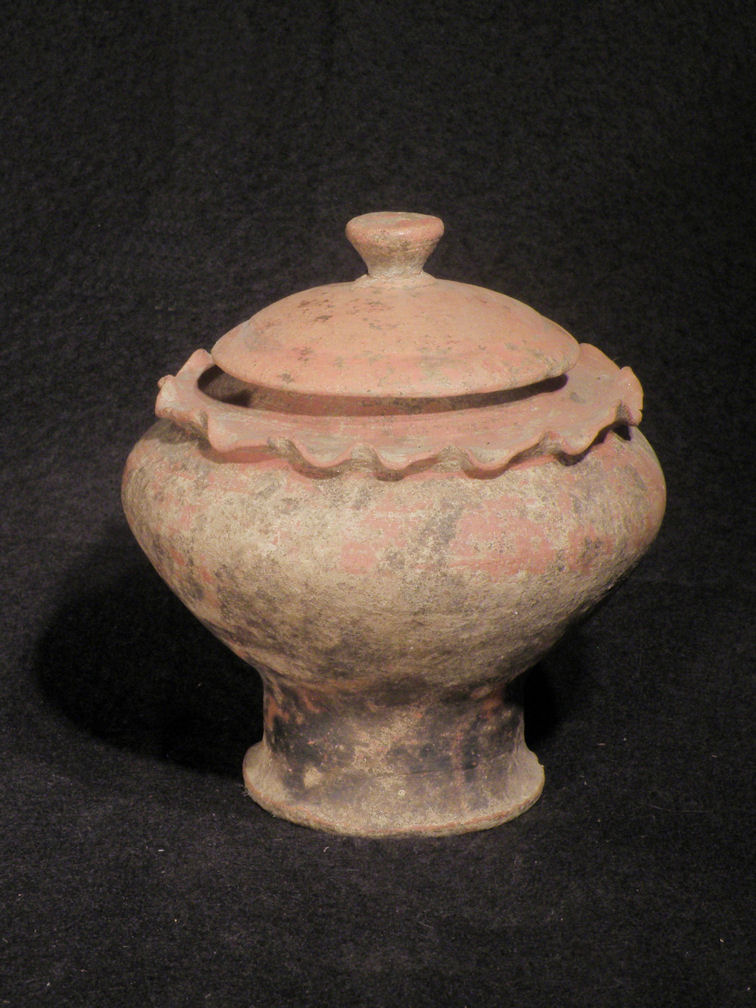

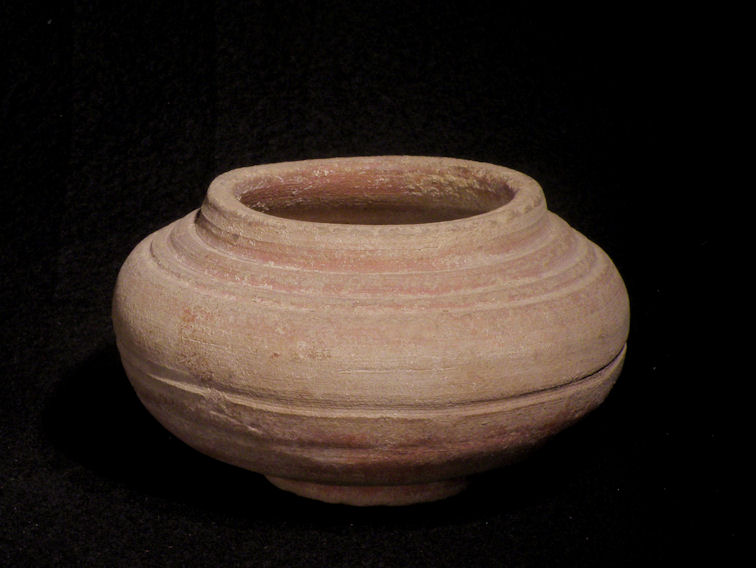

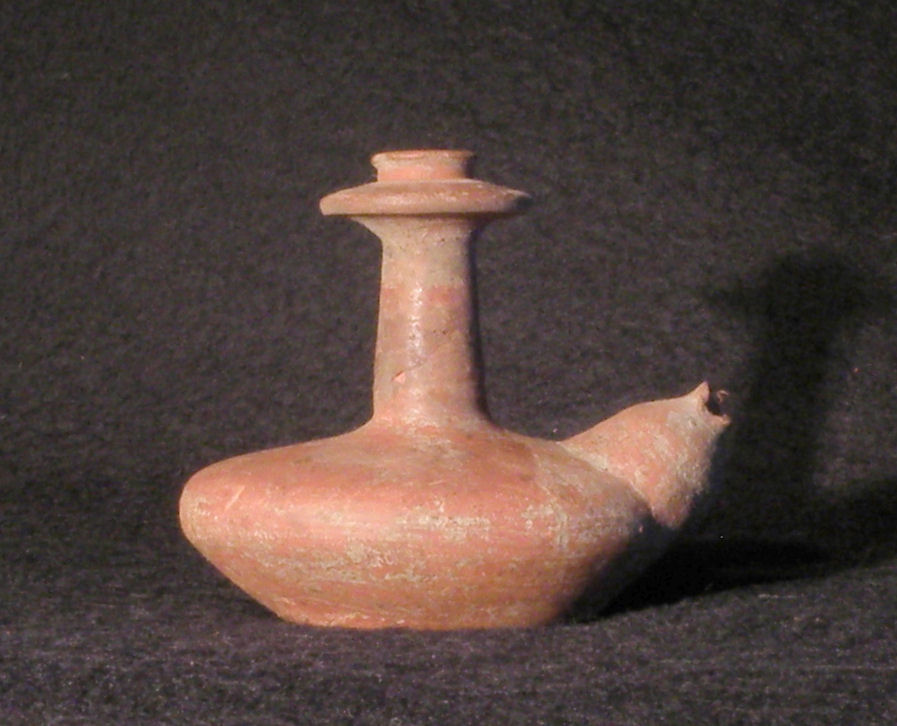
Miniature Kendi Ht 6.5 cm

=== Heads ===
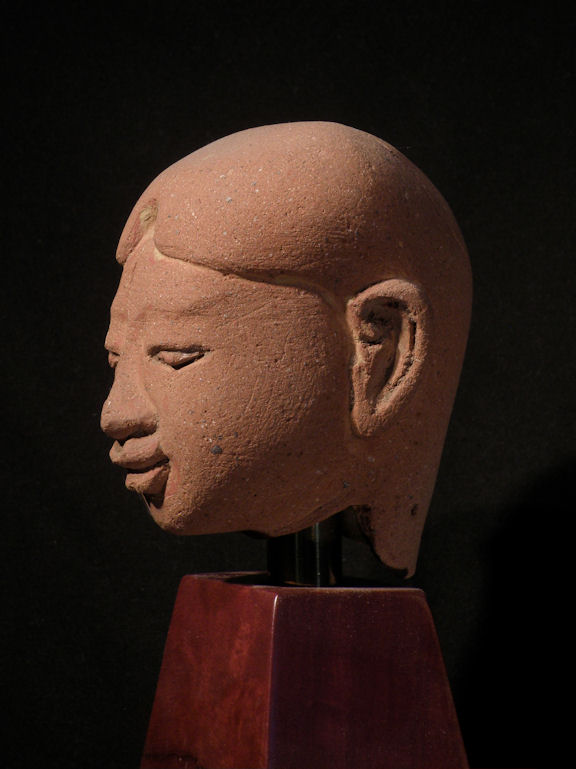
Majapahit Terracotta head

Many small heads are found in the surrounding environs with no bodies. These range in size from 3 cm up to 10 cm. Many of these heads show Javanese features with hair style and ear ornamentation. Some think that the reason there are so many more heads and headless bodies found than complete figurines is that they were decapitated in ritual offerings. If one is to look at contemporary Bali as a shadow of Majapahit, even today a small ceremony is sometimes performed in which a pair of small figures are placed on the rice field wall. These are made out of clay, unfired and are left to be reabsorbed by the elements, For the most part these heads are solid, but occasionally thin walled examples are found. It is postulated that the more heavily ornamented faces represent ladies belonging to the upper classes.

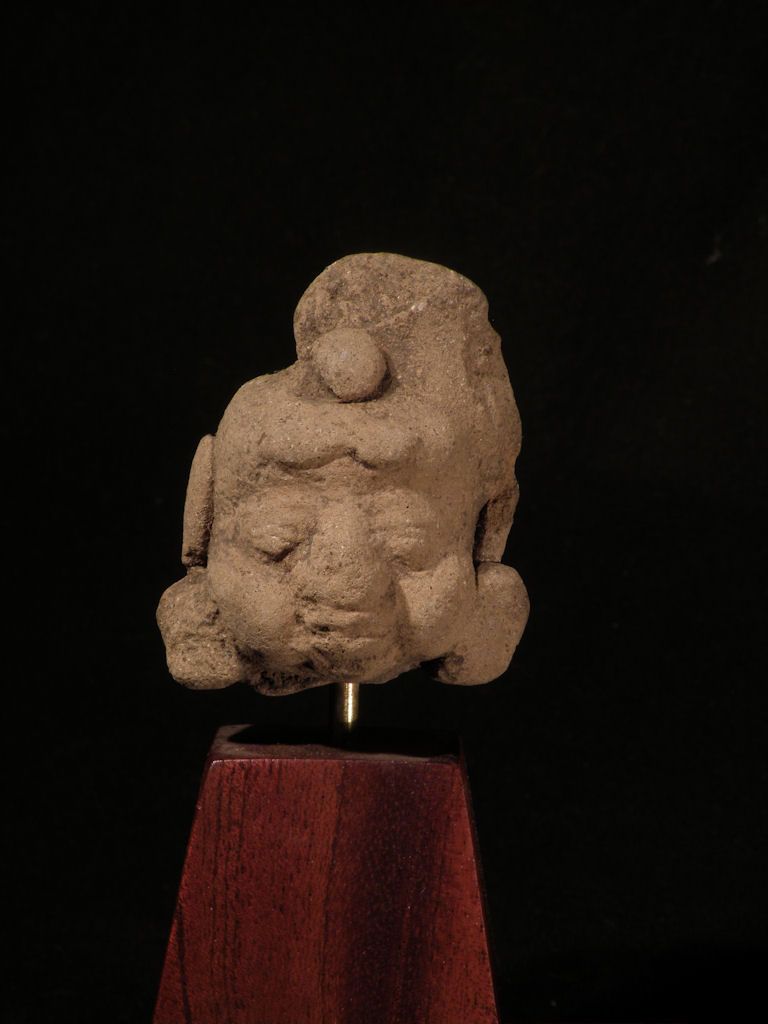

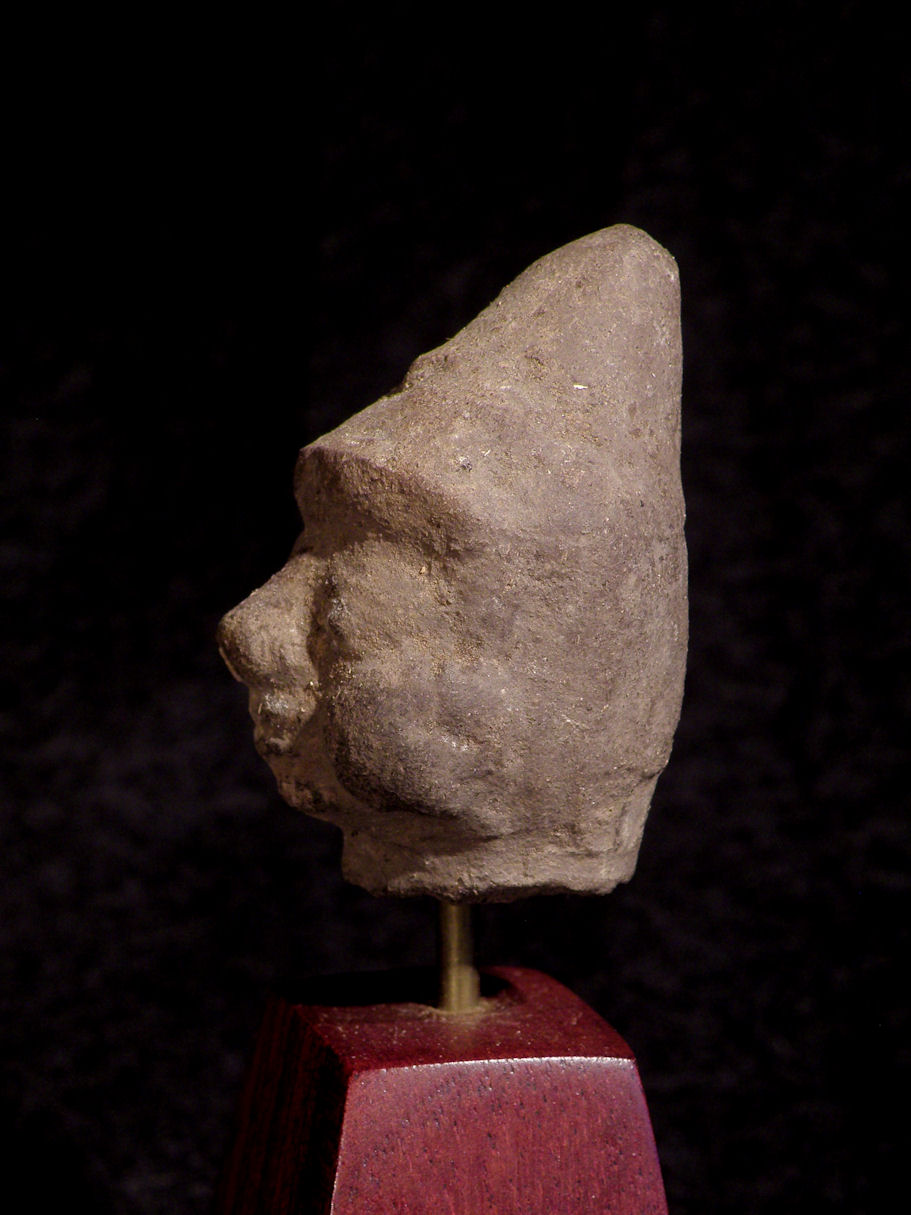

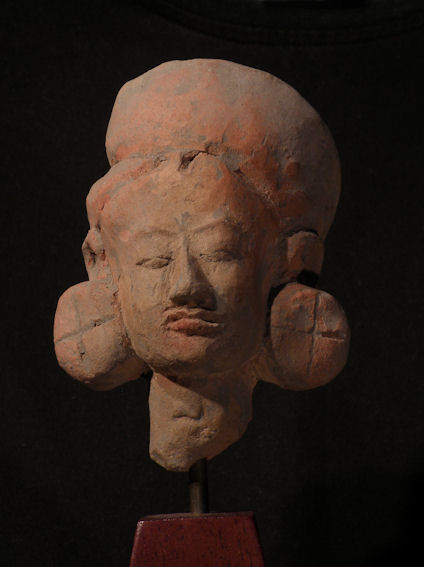

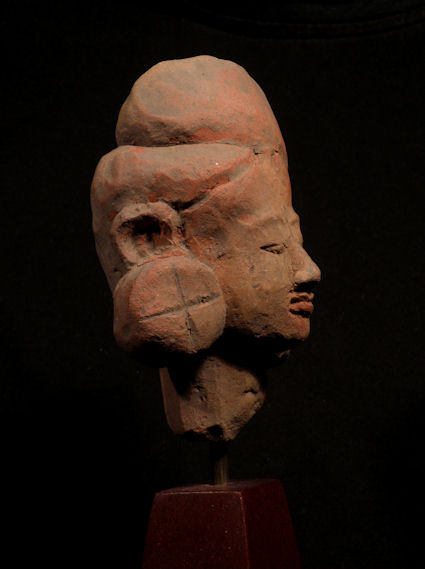

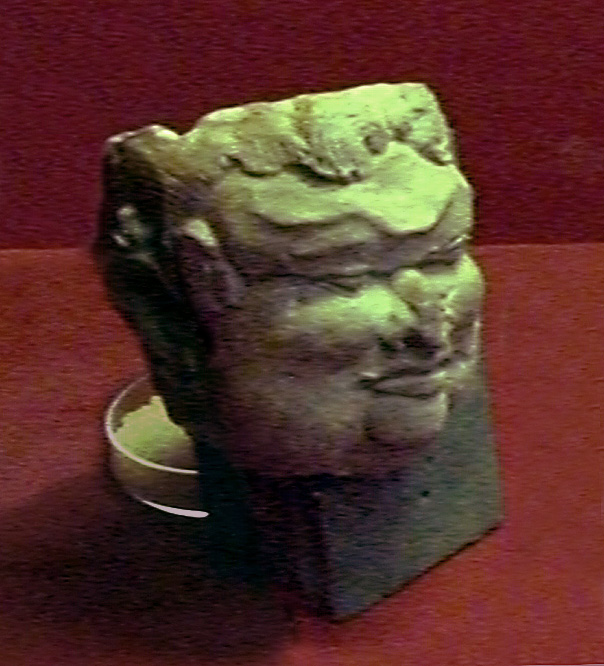

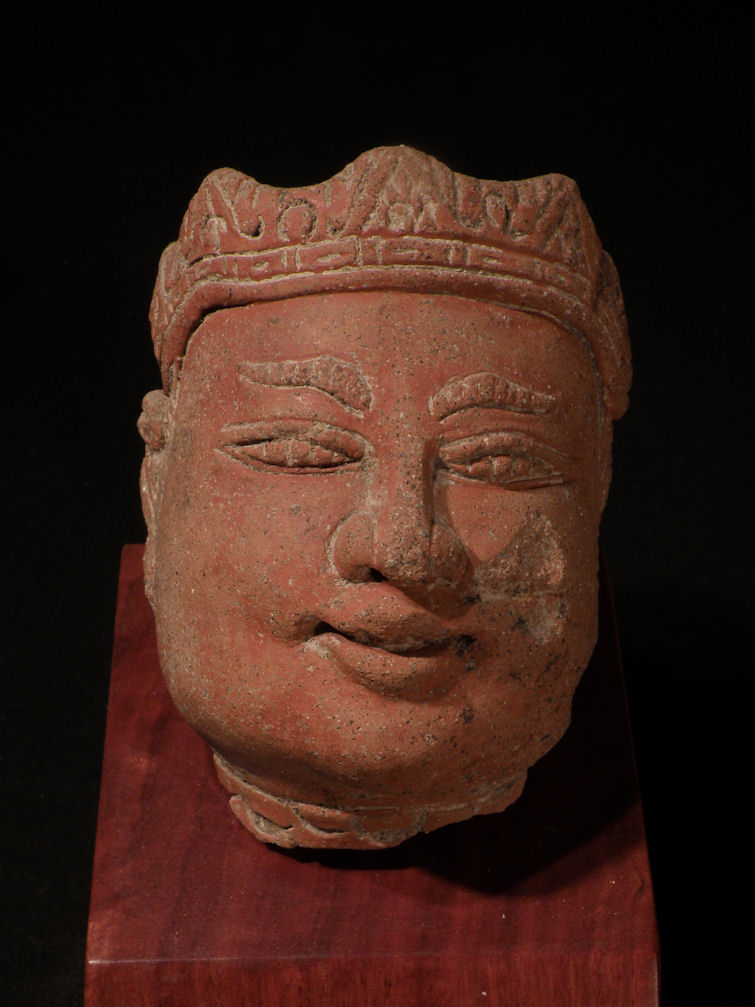

=== Figurines ===
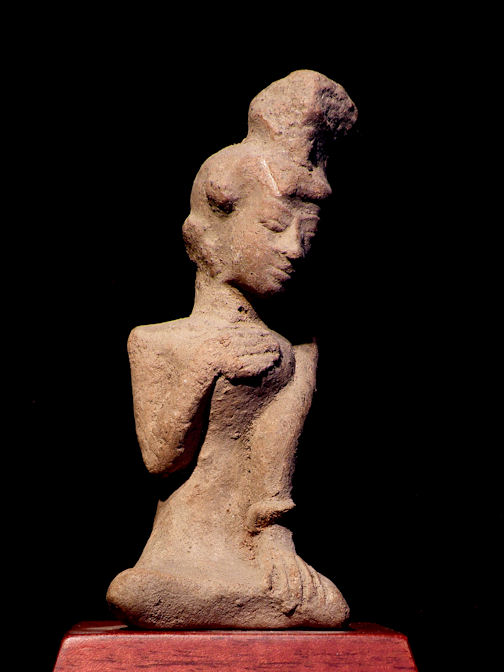
Majapahit figurine

Many human figurines have been found decapitated, suggesting their use as effigies or religious offerings. However, construction techniques may also have rendered them fragile. Another explanation is that these figurines were secular play objects, cast aside once broken. Commonly the figurines are small, measuring and constructed by the coil and pinch methods with carved or incised decorations, a forming method that is sculptural. Other figurines are made by moulding, as is the figure in the first image two images below. This is an unusual example in that there is no fracture line at the neck. The variety of expression is infinite with naturalistic postures and facial expressions. Complete figurines are rare compared to the many headless figures or heads without bodies. They often take the form of a woman sitting in a polite female pose, on her calves with her feet tucked underneath. The figure on the Right is complete. The second figurine the head has been separated but the two fragments were found together. She sits holding something to her chest. This is either a talam or offering tray, or as Kunst (1927) thought, it may be a drum. The third figurine is sitting and playing what can clearly be seen as a musical instrument. Next to her is a figurine with a red slip around her neck, presumably where at the place where the head would be separated. The reason for there being so many heads without bodies is unknown but it is speculated that the figurines were possibly decapitated in a ritual offering.

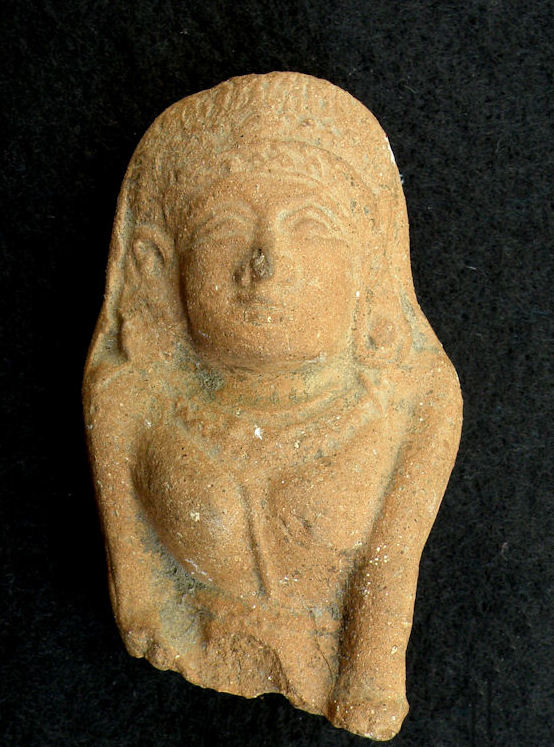

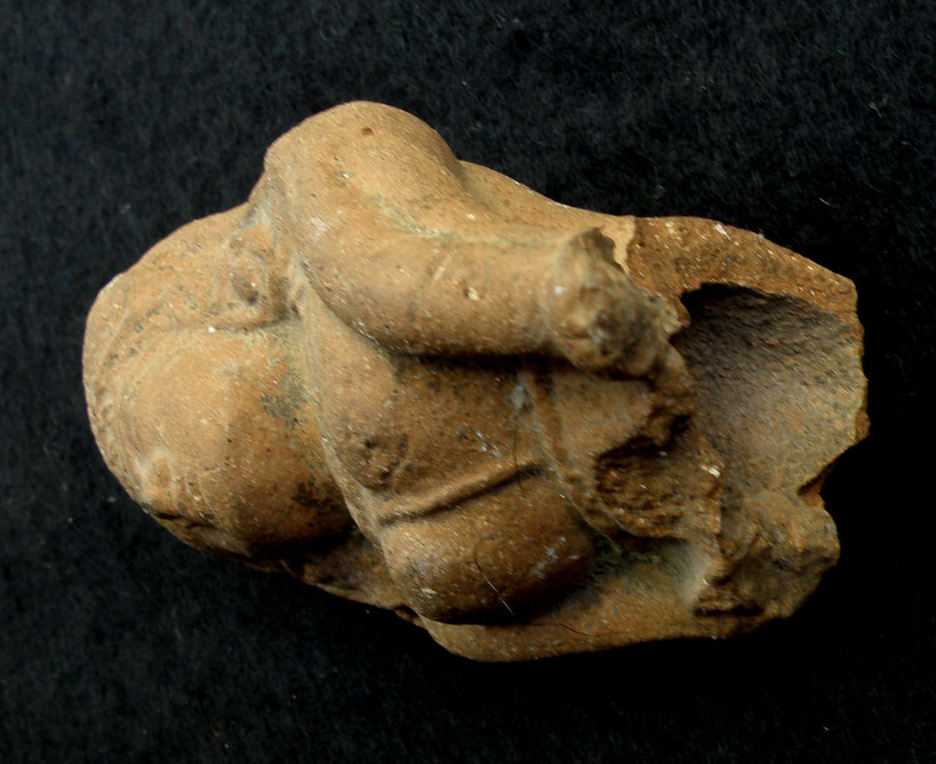

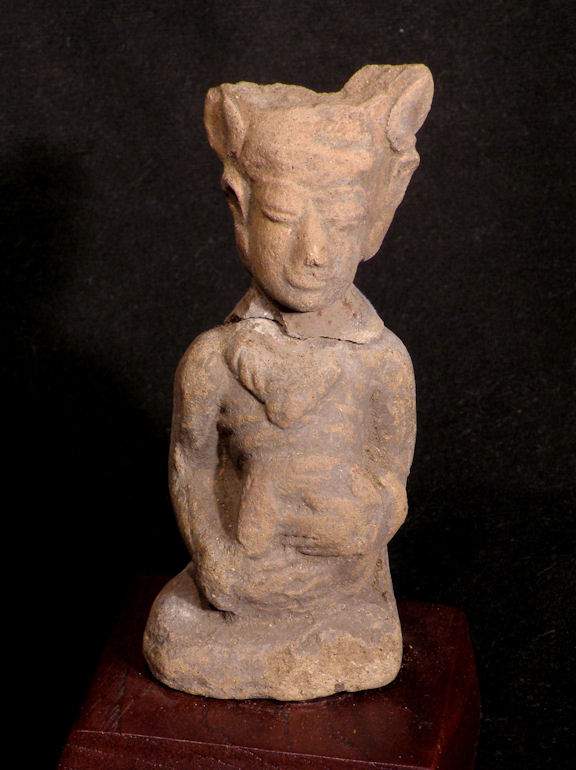

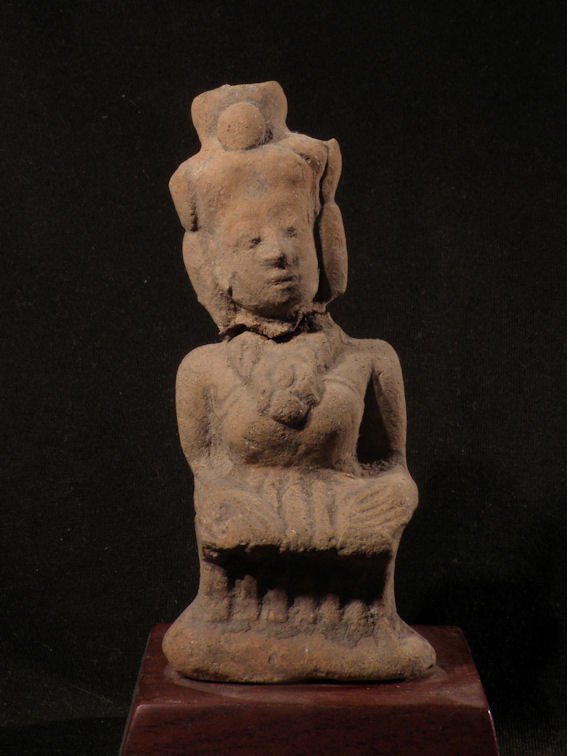

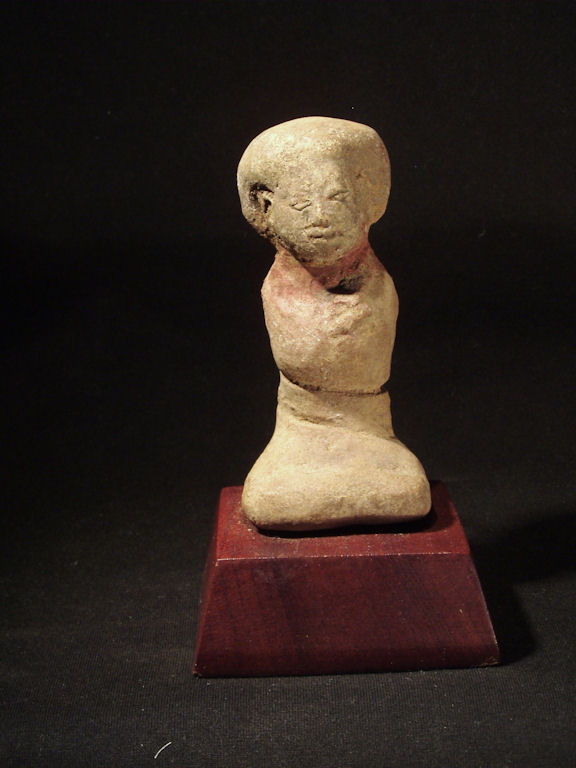

=== Animals ===
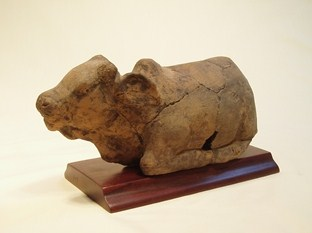
Majapahit Terracotta Nandi

One of the famous Majapahit terracotta animal figures are the piggy banks discovered in Trowulan. Other animal figures also discovered, such as Nandi bull, domestic animals, birds and elephants.

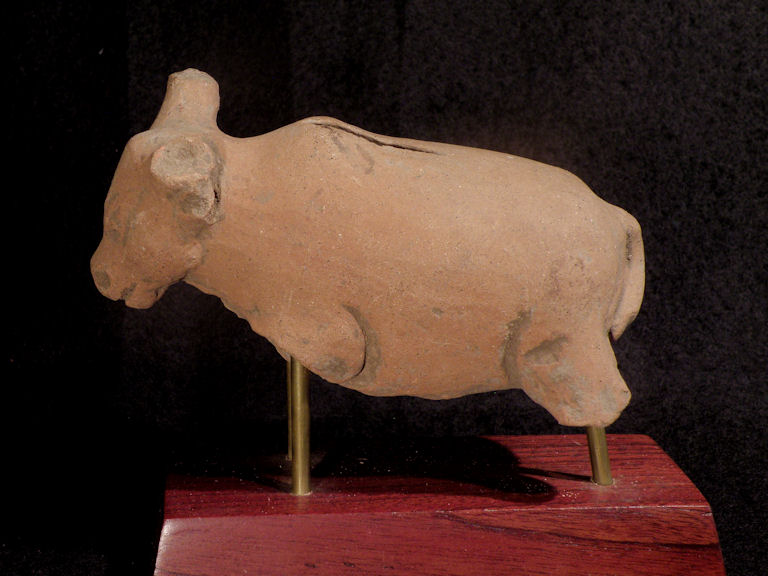

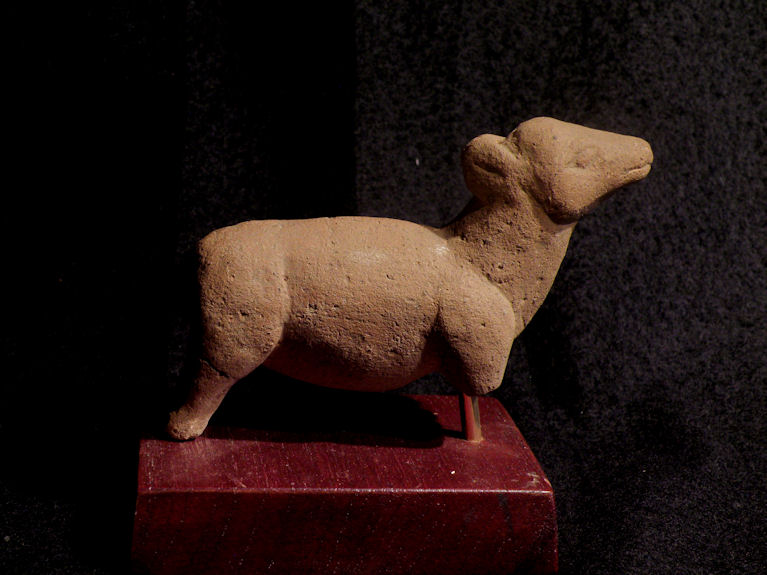

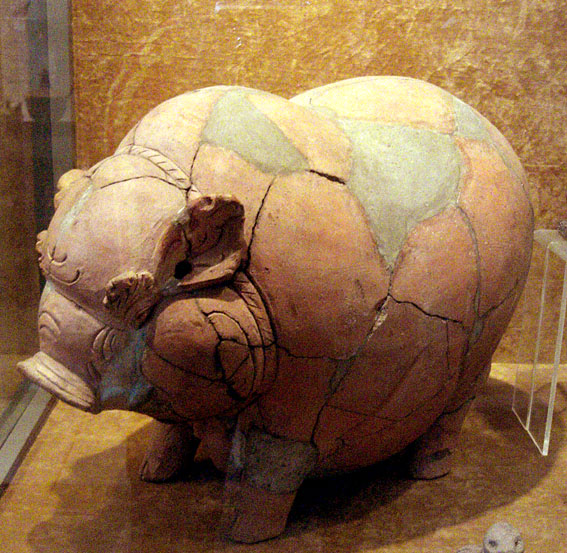

=== Reliefs ===
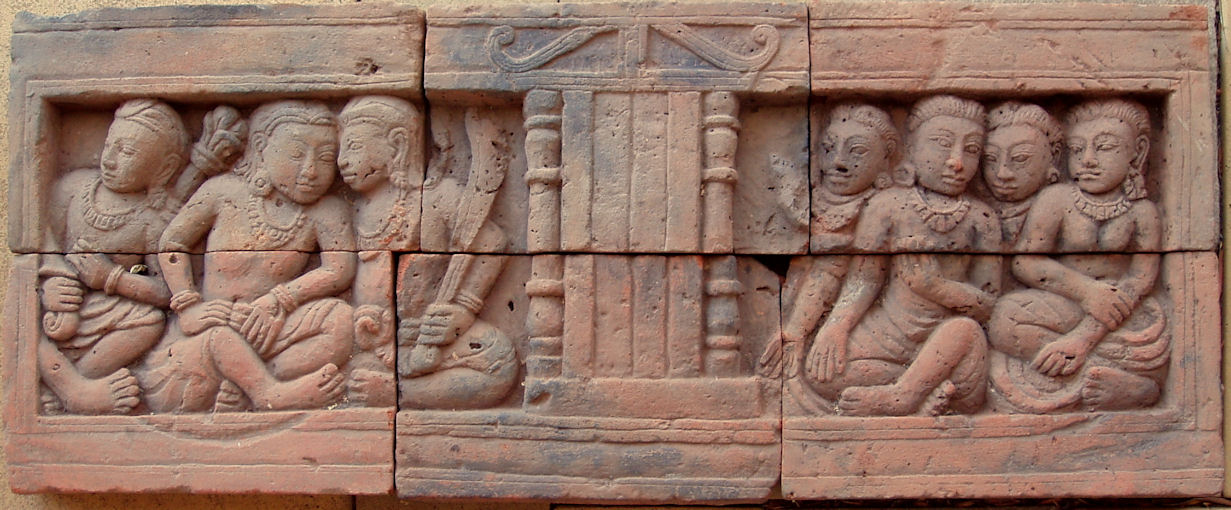
Frieze with 6 bricks

Carved bricks have been found in the area. These show scenes from daily life and depictions of religious or literary stories. The technique of construction are similar to the carved stone reliefs seen in the temples of central Java such as Borobudur. For the most part these bricks are single and in poor repair, but occasional sequences have been found. Frequently the figures in the panels are depicted in the East Java style, in which the body is full frontal, the face in the three quarter and the legs are in profile.

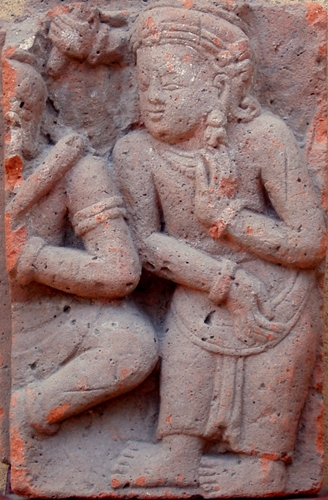

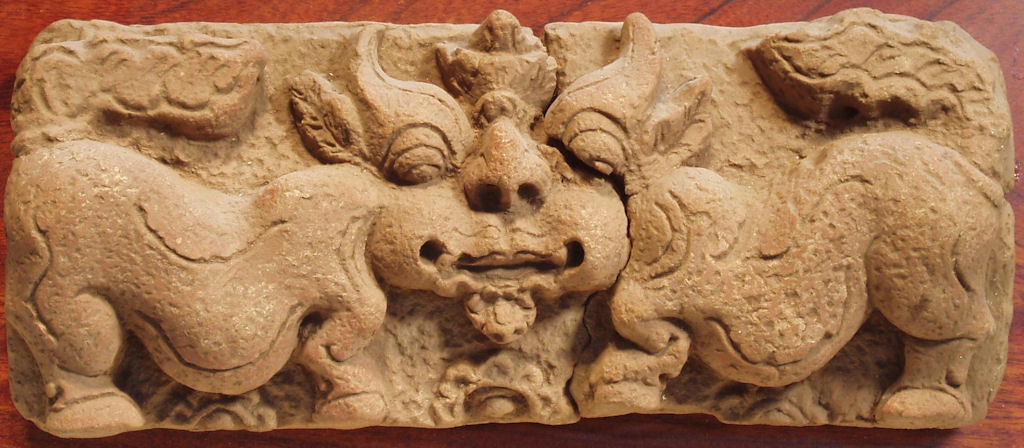

=== Other purposes ===
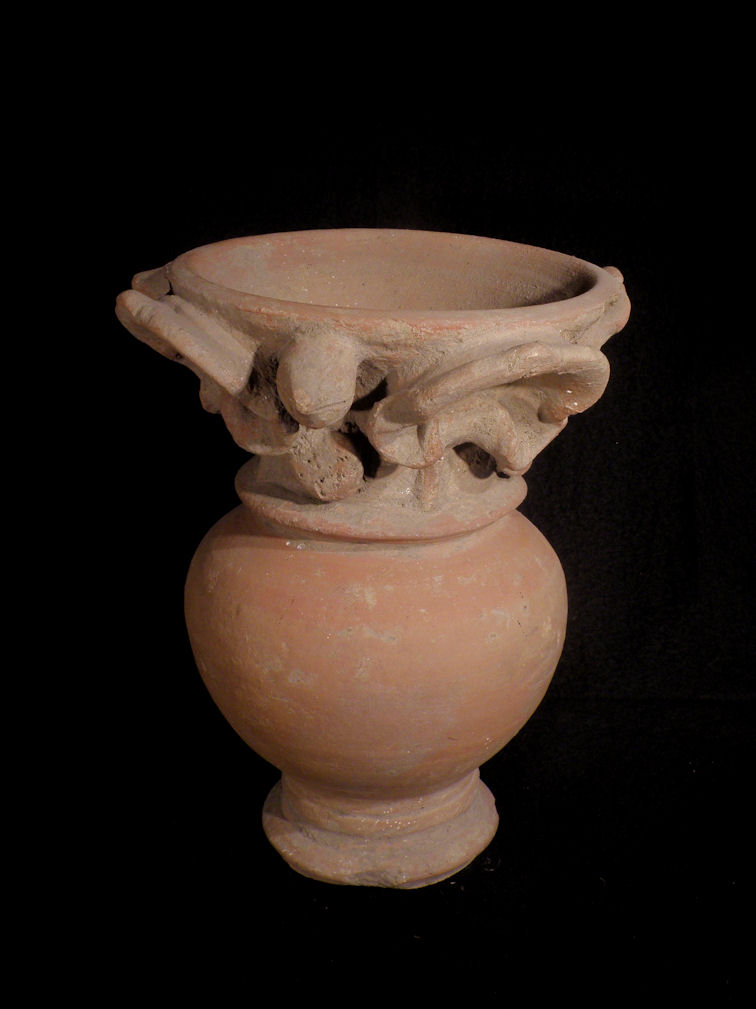
Pot stand

The people of Majapahit exploiters terracotta earthenware method, producing various objects for their daily needs. Among wide ranges objects are; roof and floor tiles to terracotta water pipes and other architectural ornaments.

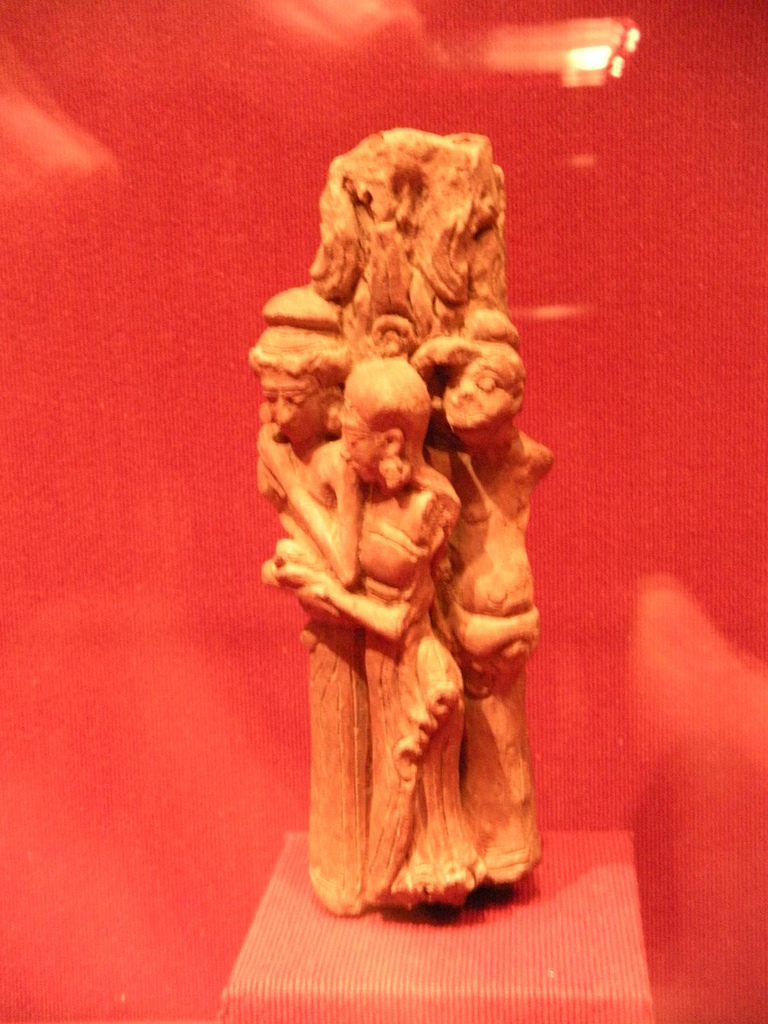
