= Kankagrambhukti =

Historical region in India

Coordinates: 23°55′00″N 87°32′00″E

Kankagrambhukti (Bengali: কঙ্কগ্রামভুক্তি) was an ancient and medieval region/ territory spread across what are now Birbhum, Purba Bardhaman, Paschim Bardhaman and Murshidabad districts in the Indian state of West Bengal.

Ancient Rarh region was divided into several smaller regions – Kankangrambhukti, Bardhamanbhukti and Dandabhukti, as part of the Gupta Empire. Kankagram was located on the banks of the Hooghly.
