= Henri Maclaine Pont =

Dutch architect and archaeologist

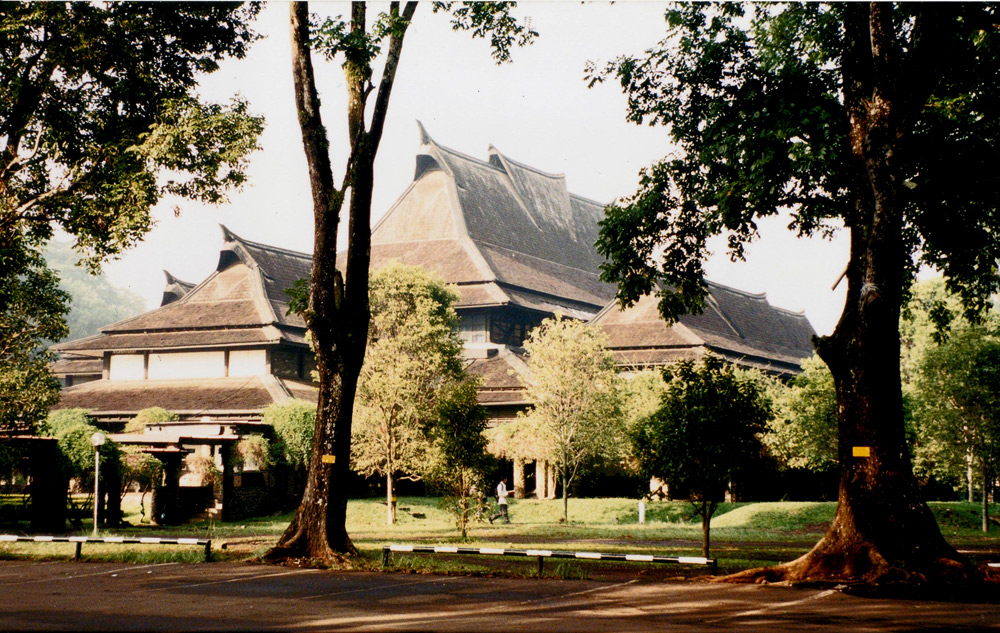
Bandung Institute of Technology designed by Henri Maclaine Pont

Henri Maclaine Pont (Meester Cornelis, Batavia, 21 June 1884 – The Hague, 3 December 1971) was a Dutch architect and archaeologist active in Indonesia, acclaimed for his synthesis of Javanese and western architecture. He is seen as the "father" of modern vernacular architecture of Indonesia.

== Biography ==
Henri Maclaine Pont studied civil engineering in Delft. After graduation, he moved back to the Dutch East Indies, where in 1911 he received his first major work, the design of the Semarang-Cheribon Steam Tram Company headquarters. In Semarang, he set up his own firm, which was later joined by Thomas Karsten. Soon, however, he fell ill and being forced to return to the Netherlands, sold the firm to Karsten, Lutjens, and Steenstra Toussaint.

He lived and worked in various places in Java and studied the Javanese pre-Islamic architecture. He wrote many articles in professional journals and had a polemic with prof. Wolff Schoemaker. In 1919 he was commissioned for the design of the Ceremonial Hall of the Bandung Institute of Technology building. The building is remarkable for the synthesis of Western technology and local architecture. In 1943, he was put in an internment camp along with the many other Europeans during the Japanese occupation, and in 1945 was brought to Australia to recover. Due to the lack of job vacancies at the Bandung Technical School, he left Indonesia in 1947 for The Hague, where he died in 1971.

His notable works also include the original Trowulan Museum (1932) and the Puh Sarang Catholic church in Kediri (1937).
