= Mojokerto Regency =

Regency in East Java, Indonesia

Mojokerto Regency Kabupaten Mojokerto
- Regency

Other transcription(s)
  - Javanese: Måjåkěrtå (Gêdrig) ماجاكۤرتا (Pégon) ꦩꦗꦏꦼꦂꦠ (Hånåcåråkå)
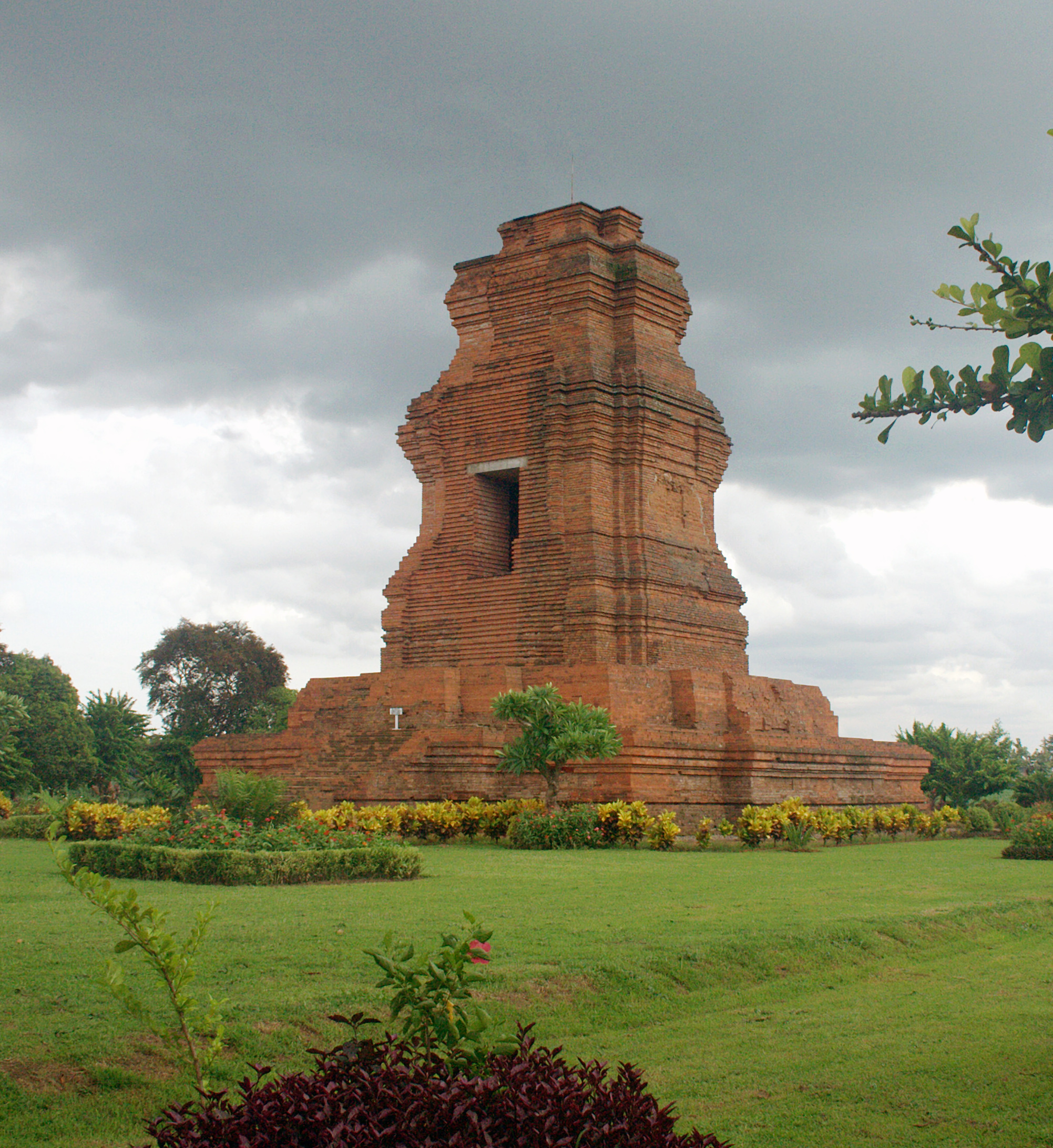
- Brahu Temple Trowulan at the town of Trowulan

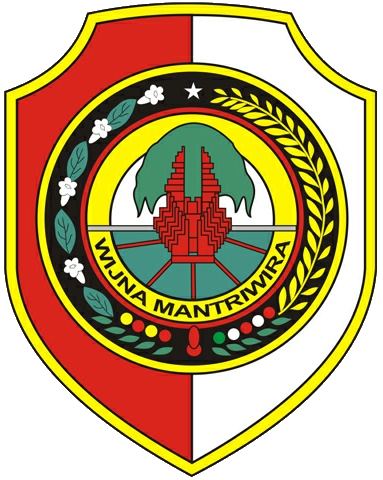
- Coat of arms
- Motto(s): Wijna Mantriwira (Wise and courageous for the country)
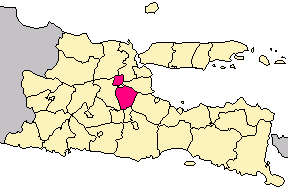
- Location within East Java

- Location in Java and Indonesia Mojokerto Regency (Indonesia)
- Coordinates: 7°33′S 112°30′E
- Country: Indonesia
- Province: East Java
- Capital: Mojosari

Government
  - Regent: Muhammad Al Barra
  - Vice Regent: Muhammad Rizal Octavian

Area
  - Total: 969.36 km^{2} (374.27 sq mi)

Population (mid 2025 estimate)
  - Total: 1,162,896
  - Density: 1,199.7/km^{2} (3,107.1/sq mi)
- Time zone: UTC+7 (IWST)
- Area code: (+62) 321
- Website: mojokertokab.go.id

Mojokerto Regency (Indonesian: Kabupaten Mojokerto; Javanese: ꦩꦗꦏꦼꦂꦠ, romanized: Måjåkertå) is a regency in the Indonesian province of East Java. It is part of the Surabaya metropolitan area (known as Gerbangkertosusila) which comprises Gresik Regency, Bangkalan Regency, Mojokerto Regency, Mojokerto City, Surabaya City, Sidoarjo Regency, and Lamongan Regency. The Regency covers an area of 969.36 km^{2} (excluding the independent city of Mojokerto, which is a separate administrative area). The population of the Regency was 908,004 in 2000, but had risen to 1,025,443 at the 2010 Census and to 1,119,209 at the 2020 Census; the official estimate as of mid 2025 was 1,162,896 (comprising 585,187 males and 577,709 females), Many of them earn their living as small farmers and craftsmen (consisting of shoemakers, furniture makers, and souvenir makers).

The administrative capital is the town of Mojosari.

== Administrative districts ==
The regency is divided into eighteen districts (kecamatan), tabulated below with their areas and population totals from the 2010 Census and the 2020 Census, together with the official estimates as of mid 2025. The table also includes the locations of the district administrative centres (all the districts are named after these centres), the number of administrative villages in each district (totaling 299 rural desa and 5 urban kelurahan - the latter all in Mojosari District), and its postal codes.

Kode Wilayah	Name of District (kecamatan)	Area in km^{2}	Pop'n Census 2010	Pop'n Census 2020	Pop'n Estimate mid 2025	Admin centre	No. of villages	Post codes
35.16.01	Jatirejo	107.62	39,713	44,012	45,661	Jatirejo	19	61373
35.16.02	Gondang	98.62	38,850	42,836	44,946	Gondang	18	61372
35.16.03	Pacet	107.98	53,015	58,520	61,362	Pacet	20	61374
35.16.04	Trawas	58.00	28,302	30,842	32,193	Trawas	13	61375
35.16.05	Ngoro	70.50	79,469	85,109	87,047	Ngoro	19	61385
35.16.06	Pungging	45.00	71,934	78,788	82,436	Pungging	19	61384
35.16.07	Kutorejo	43.50	57,527	66,257	69,457	Kutorejo	17	61383
35.16.08	Mojosari	28.85	73,945	77,997	81,546	Mojosari	18 ^{(a)}	61382
35.16.10	Bangsal	25.84	46,625	50,824	53,484	Bangsal	17	61381
35.16.18	Mojoanyar	23.37	46,466	50,541	50,589	Mojoanyar	12	61363 & 31364
35.16.09	Dlanggu	35.82	50,064	55,352	58,500	Dlanggu	16	61371
35.16.11	Puri	34.65	70,463	77,988	80,953	Puri	16	61363 & 31364
35.16.12	Trowulan	45.93	68,154	74,409	78,052	Trowulan	16	61362
35.16.13	Sooko	19.30	68,759	74,874	75,835	Sooko	15	61361
	Totals for Southern zone	744.98	792,286	868,349	902,061		236	
35.16.14	Gedek	26.18	52,700	56,490	58,503	Gedek	14	61351
35.16.15	Kemlagi	42.35	51,793	57,588	60,548	Kemlagi	20	61353
35.16.16	Jetis	53.05	79,967	86,237	89,287	Jetis	16	61352
35.16.17	Dawarblandong	102.80	47,697	50,545	52,497	Dawarblandong	18	61354
	Totals for Northern zone	224.38	233,157	250,860	260,835		68	
	Totals for Regency	969.36	1,025,443	1,119,209	1,162,896	Mojosari	304	

Note: (a) comprising 5 urban kelurahan (Kauman, Mojosari, Sarirejo, Sawahan and Wonokusumo) and 13 rural desa.

The city of Mojokerto, which since 1999 has been administratively independent of the Regency (although the regency administration remains at present located within the city), virtually divides the regency into two zones - the southern zone comprising the first 14 districts listed above, and the smaller northern zone, comprising the last 4 districts listed above. The Brantas River physically separates the southern zone (and the city, which lies on its south bank) from the northern zone.

== Neighbouring regencies ==
- Northern boundary: Gresik and Lamongan
- Southern boundary: Malang
- Eastern boundary: Sidoarjo and Pasuruan
- Western boundary: Jombang

Mojokerto Regency's area is 969.36 km^{2}, located between 15 m and 3,156 m above sea level. It is divided into northern and southern regions by the Brantas River. The southern region contains several mountains, which includes Mount Welirang (3,156 m), Mount Anjasmoro (2,277 m) include, and Mount Penanggungan (1,693m).

One of the more famous locations in Mojokerto is Pacet, which has a good mountainous view.

== Sleeping Buddha ==
The biggest Sleeping Buddha Statue in Indonesia is in Maha Vihara Mojopahit Bejijong, Trowulan District, Mojokerto Regency. The statue is 22 metres in length, 6 metres in width and 4.5 metres in height.
