= Pori (disambiguation) =

Pori is a city in Finland.

Pori may also refer to:

- Pori (album), a 1998 studio album by Circle
- Pori (film), a 2007 Indian Tamil-language film starring Jiiva
- Pori, Estonia, village in Põdrala Parish, Valga County, Estonia
- University Consortium of Pori, a group of Finnish universities
- Pori, a type of Indian puffed rice also called muri

== See also ==
- Puri (disambiguation)
