= Puri Puri =

Puri Puri or puripuri may refer to:

- Princess Princess (band), commonly known as Puri Puri, Japanese band
- Puripuri, the practice of sorcery in Papua New Guinea
- Puri-Puri Prisoner, a character in the Japanese manga One-Punch Man

== See also ==
- Puri (disambiguation)
