= Trowulan Museum =

Archaeological museum in East Java, Indonesia

Coordinates: 7°33′36″S 112°22′51″E

Trowulan Museum Museum Trowulan
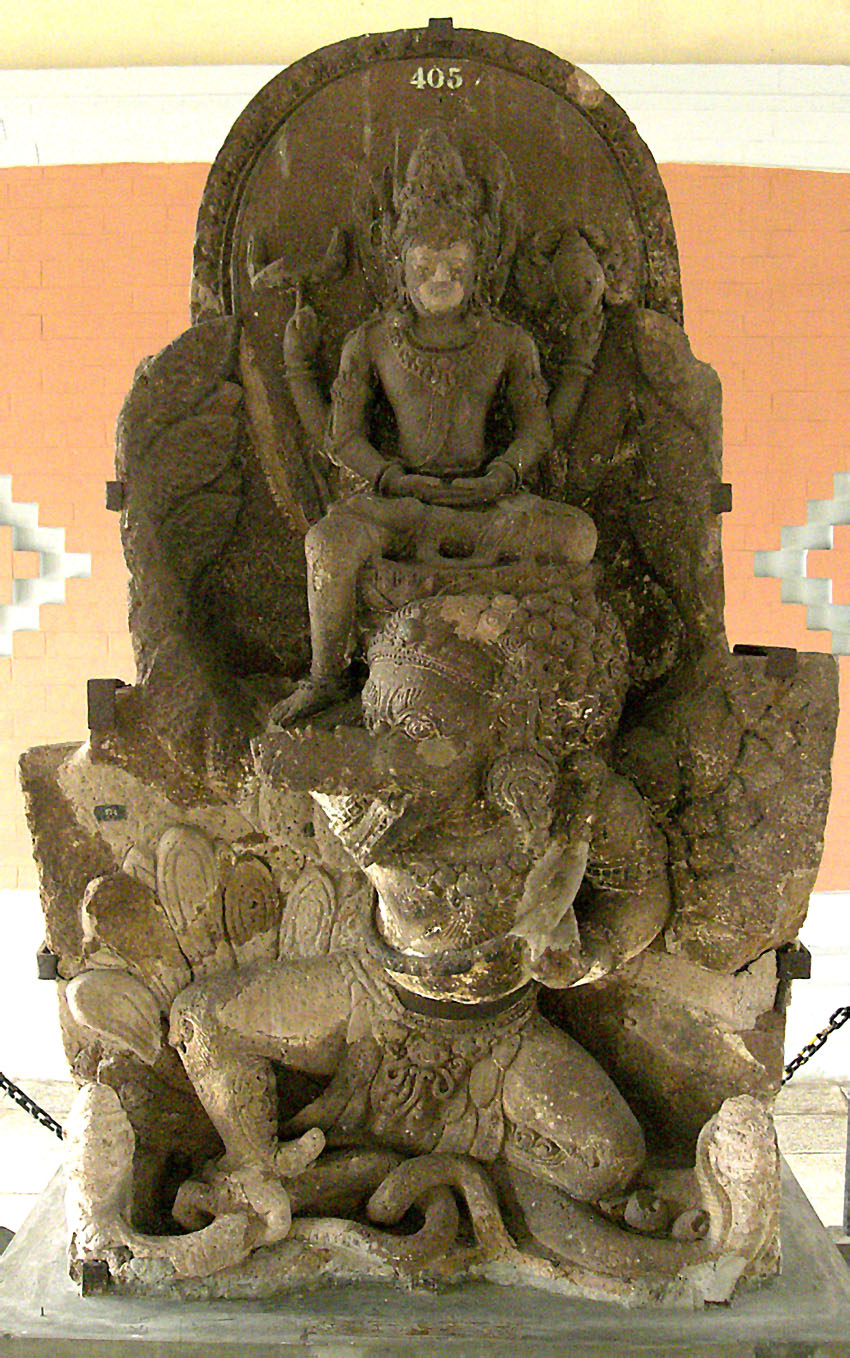
- Statue of Airlangga in Trowulan Museum.
- Established: 1987
- Location: Trowulan, Mojokerto, East Java, Indonesia
- Type: Archaeology museum

The Trowulan Museum is an archaeological museum located in Trowulan, Mojokerto, in East Java, Indonesia. The museum was built in order to house the artifacts and archaeological findings discovered around Trowulan and its vicinity. The location is one of the more important in Indonesia in relation to tracing the history of Majapahit

Most of the museum collections is originated from the Majapahit era, however the collections also covered the era of Kahuripan, Kediri, and Singhasari kingdoms in East Java. The museum is located on the western side of the kolam Segaran. Trowulan museum has the largest collection of Majapahit relics in Indonesia.

== History ==
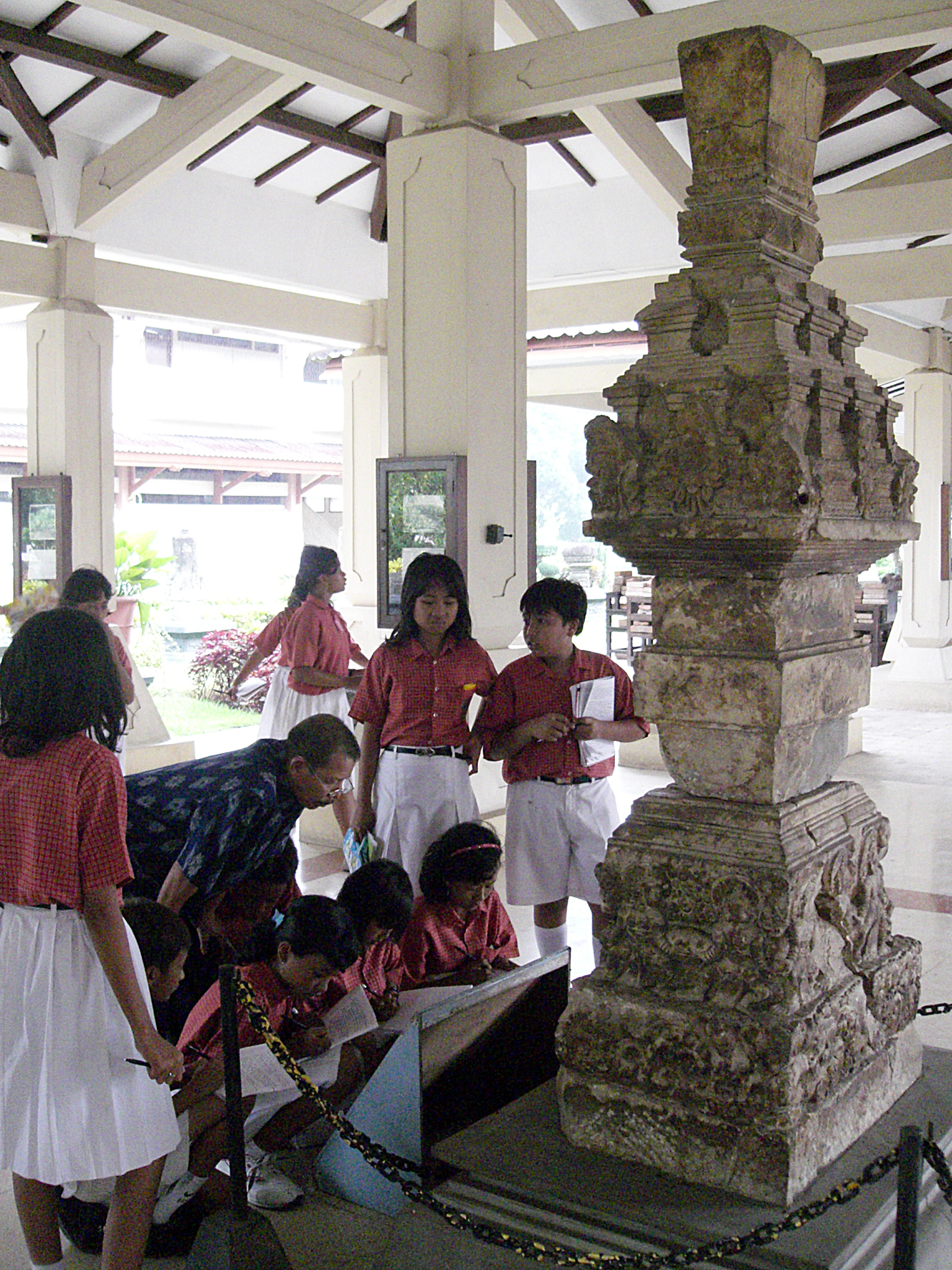
A sculpture depicting Samodramanthana, the churning of sea of milk.

The Trowulan Museum's history is intertwined with Trowulan archaeological site itself. The ancient city ruins at Trowulan had been discovered by the 19th century. Sir Thomas Stamford Raffles, governor of Java from 1811 until 1816 reported the existence of ruins of temples scattered about the country for many miles. Much of the region was blanketed with dense teak forest at that time, making detailed survey difficult.

The urgent need to prevent looting and stealing from Trowulan archaeological site was one of the main reasons to build a simple archaeological storage building that became the old Trowulan Museum. It was established by Henri Maclaine Pont, a Dutch architect and archaeologist, and the Mojokerto regent Kanjeng Adipati Ario Kromodjojo Adinegoro.

The new museum was officially opened in 1987. Covering a spacious area of some 57,625 square metres, this new site accommodates the collection of the old Trowulan Museum, as well as the bulk of the stone sculpture which used to be housed in the museum of Mojokerto.

A newer museum is also proposed for the area and the location has been proposed as a World Heritage area

== Collection ==
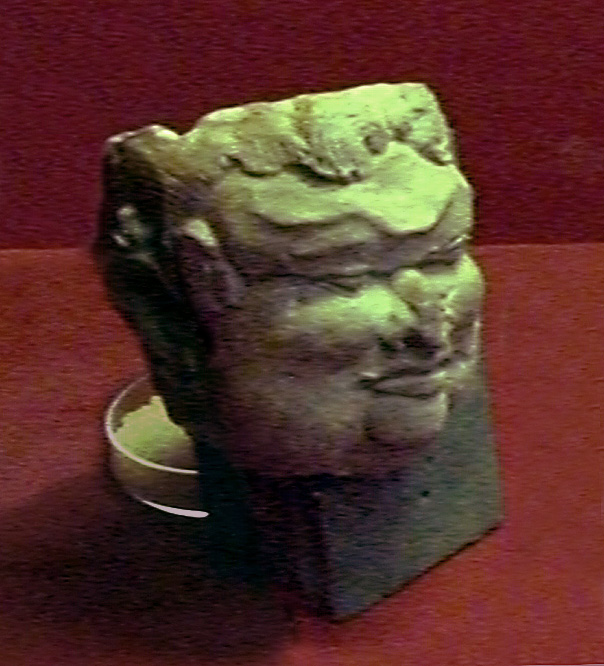
The Majapahit Terracotta

Today the museum not only houses the archaeological relics from Majapahit era, but also collects and displays various archaeological relics discovered all over East Java. From the era of King Airlangga, Kediri, to the era of Singhasari and Majapahit. Large collections of Hindu-Buddhist stone sculptures as well as Majapahit Terracotta art also displayed in the museum.

Among the objects on display, include the famous portrait statue of Airlangga portrayed as Vishnu mounting Garuda, from Candi Belahan. A winged figure which is said to portray the legendary king of Blambangan, Menak Jinggo. A part of Candi recovered from a site at Ampelgading Malang. A statue displays the story Samodramanthana, or "The Churning of the Ocean of Milk" in finely carved relief.

== See also ==
- List of museums and cultural institutions in Indonesia
