= Bardhamanbhukti =

Ancient and medieval region/ territory

Coordinates: 23°15′N 87°51′E

Bardhamanbhukti was an ancient and medieval region/territory of Bengal spread across what are now Purba Bardhaman, Paschim Bardhaman and Bankura districts in the Indian state of West Bengal.

Ancient Rarh region was divided into several smaller regions – Kankagrambhukti, Bardhamanbhukti and Dandabhukti, as part of the Gupta Empire. After the fall of Guptas rule in Bengal, Dandabhukukti and Bardhamanbhukti regions became part of the independent Kingdom of Vanga which emerged in early 500s. The area was bound by three rivers – Ajay, Dwarakeswar and Hooghly. To the east there were forests.
