= Jumog waterfall =

Jumog Waterfall
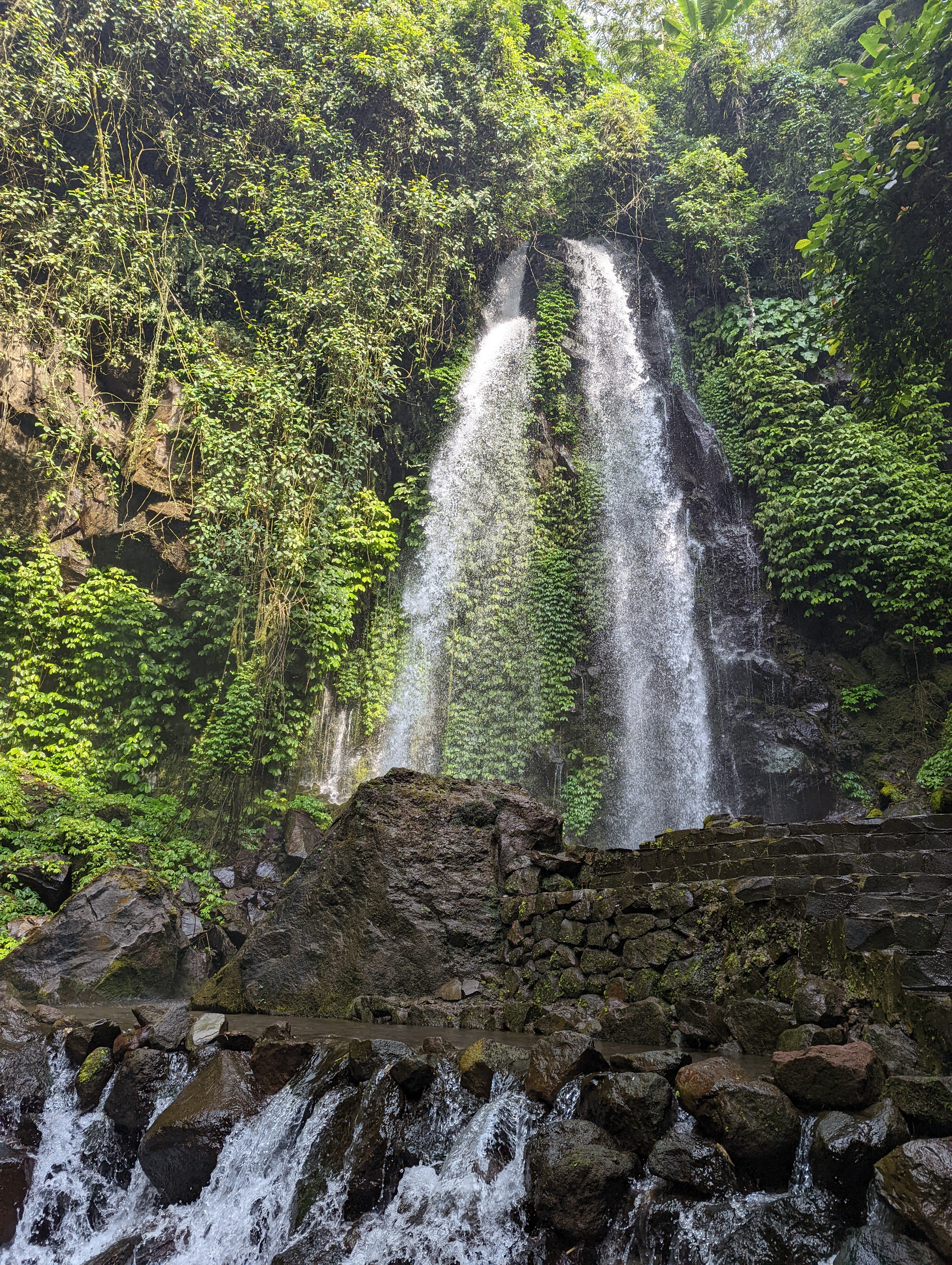
- Jumog waterfall in 2022

- Location within Karanganyar Regency Location within Java Location within Indonesia
- Location: Berjo Village, Karanganyar, Karanganyar Regency, Indonesia
- Coordinates: 7.630967399999999°S 111.1262805°E

Jumog Waterfall (Indonesian: Air Terjun Jumog) is a natural waterfall in Berjo Village, Karanganyar Regency, Central Java, Indonesia. It is located on the western slopes of Mount Lawu. The waterfall lies between 800 and 1,000 metres above sea level and is about 30 metres high. It is a popular nature tourism site in the region and is close to the historic Sukuh Temple.
This waterfall was opened on August 7, 2004. The local villagers helped to remove forest and build the first paths down to the waterfall. Currently, the waterfall is managed by the village-owned institution, BUMDes. The institution ensures that the money made from entrance tickets goes back into the community to fund public welfare and repair local roads. The river branches into three streams: the Klueng, Kusumajati, and Jubleg. The site is designed for easy access, with visitors entering through the main gate having to descend 116 concrete steps to reach the bottom of the valley.

== History ==
The name "Jumog" comes from the name of the hill where the waterfall was found. Before its development into a commercial attraction, the site was not known to anyone else except the locals. The waterfall was found on public treasury lands (Tanah Kas Desa) under the Berjo Village government. It was located in inaccessible terrain surrounded by ravines, rocky cliffs, and wilderness full of wild bamboos and sengon trees. Due to the terrain, the locals used to call the place "The Lost Paradise."

The modern history of the site dates back to 1992, when the Berjo community conducted its survey of the hidden ravine and made an official registration of the site with the authorities of the Karanganyar Regency. There was no immediate response from the authorities in charge which left the site untouched for another decade. It was not until July 2004 that the village leaders of the Berjo community organized a common community expedition, which cleared the way using simple hand instruments to reach the water. From an archaeological point of view, the waterfalls are located within the historical environment existing on the slopes of Mount Lawu and near some historically significant structures from the period of Majapahit Empire of the 15th century like Sukuh temple. Javanese culture specialists state that this place belongs to the historical system of the sources of water at a high altitude level for practicing tapa by Javanese nobility in order to escape from others.

== Economics and Tourism ==
The local villagers control the tourism and management of the site. The revenue generated from the ticket sales and parking fees is used for developing the village. Employment is provided to the locals through management. There are some food stalls near the bank of the river that sell local foods such as rabbit satay (satay kelinci) and hot meat ball soup.

It ranked as the second largest natural attraction sites in Karanganyar Regency. In 2024, the total number of tourists visiting the site was 397,744 where there were more than 5,000 tourists visiting every day during Eid al-Fitr and other national holidays due to the low entrance fees. The park generates up to IDR 11 billion per year.

The waterfall is located near the Sukuh and Setho Temple around 15th century and organizes their annual spiritual festival. At the bank of the river, there is the Suro Festival celebration (new year of Java) where thousands of tourists climb to the top of Mount Lawu. This offers tourists an opportunity to be part of the Javanese festivals. One other festival organized is called Merti Desa - the thanksgiving village festival with a street parade and puppet show at night.
