= Lebak Cibedug =

Megalithic pyramid in Banten, Indonesia

Coordinates: 6°45′54″S 106°09′03″E

Lebak Cibedug Pyramid
- Location within Java Lebak Cibedug (Indonesia)
- Location: Banten, West Java, Indonesia.

Lebak Cibedug temple, is a terraced pyramid shaped sacred megalithic site on the bank of Cibedug river near Citorek village in Banten Province at the west end of the island of Java, Indonesia. There are other megalithic menhirs and dolmens on this site.

== Location ==
Citorek is 130 km southwest of Jakarta airport via Indonesian National Route 1 till Balaraja and then south via Jalan Raya Maja and Jalan Raya Cipnas to Citorek. Citorek is 90 km west of Bogor city via Indonesian National Route 11 and then south via Jalan Sukajaya and Jalan Raya Cipnas to Citorek.

The forested site, surrounded by trees and volcanic andesite stones, is reached by 2 hour trekking from Citorek village to the smaller Cibedeg village in the west. The Cibedeg village is administratively consider part of Citorek village. Citorek is reachable by a paved road, after which the Cibedeg village and the Cibedeg archaeological site can be reached either by trekking on foot or by pillion riding the hired motorcycle taxis called "ojek". The site is located on the slope of Pasir Manggu hill. The path from Citorek to Cibedug monument is paved with stones pavement along the rolling hillocks and ridges and a suspension bridge which is accessible only by the two wheeled vehicles or trekkers. After the suspension bridge the path is widens. The path, made of slippery stones and clay has poor rain drainage, also has landslides point. Near the monument is the Cibedug village which can be reached only on the foot.

Site is located in the forest next to the Mount Halimun Salak National Park. other nearby attractions include beaches, such as Pulo Manuk, Ciantir and Tanjung Layar.

== History ==
It was mentioned in 's book "Megalithic Remains in South Sumatra". It was used as a sacred site by the locals, and tourists still offer prayers. Native villagers can be hired as guides, who also explain the folklore related to the site.

== Architecture ==
Cibedug pyramid has nine terraces with menhirs and altars on them. Square shaped terraces were constructed with oval-shaped andesite stones. It was used as a sacred site. Couple of meters to the left before the entrance of stairs, there is an altar arrangement of 4 menhir stones, which are called "tukuh stone", '"scratched stone" and '"wells". On the entrance of the stairs there is an upright menhir stone, 235 cm tall and 336 cm in diameter, which is the largest menhir on this site. There are other menhirs and dolmen littered around the area.

On this 2-hectare (4.9-acre) site, west of pyramid is the Cibedug river. Before the entrance to the main pyramid, there are two more smaller megalithic platforms with only one and two terraces respectively.

== Influence on other temple's architecture ==
Lebak Cibedug monument design is older than the temples of Bali, and its design is considered the inspiration for designing the Pura Dalem Segara Madhu temple in Bali. The architectural concept of a complex consisted of different level terraces influenced many examples of Hindu / Buddhist temples in the Archipelago, and can still be seen in large part of Hindu temples in Bali.

== Threats ==
This abandoned site is not managed by the government and there are no tourist facilities such as drinking water and restrooms. Site is under threats of erosion from rains, archaeological theft and vandalism, encroachment and damage by the forest vegetation, pollution due to lack of onsite visitor facilities, thus putting the site at the risk of disappearance. Site desperately needs excavation, historic identification and documentation, restoration, onsite management, security fence and guard, and ongoing archaeological study and upgrades to protect this ancient heritage of Indonesia.

== See also ==
Pyramid temples in Indonesia

- Candi Kethek, 5 terraces
- Pugung Raharjo, 5 terraces
- Candi Sukuh, 3 terraces

Related topics in Java

- Candi Ceto
- Candi of Indonesia
- Prambanan Temple, 6th-9th century UNESCO heritage Hindu temple in Central Java.
- Sunda Kingdom, 7th-16th century Indianised Hindu kingdom in Western and Central Java.
- Taruma Kingdom, 2nd-6th century Indianised Hindu kingdom of Western Java.

Other related topics

- Greater India
- Indianisation
- History of Indian influence on Southeast Asia
- Hinduism in Indonesia
- Buddhism in Indonesia
- List of places with columnar jointed volcanics
