= Sadiman =

Indonesian volunteer forester

Sadiman (born 4 February 1952) is an Indonesian volunteer forester who has planted roughly 11,000 ficus and banyan trees over a 100- or 250-ha area, reducing erosion and resulting in the creations of several new springs.

Originally a construction worker by profession, Sadiman moved to Dali Hamlet, Geneng Village, Bulukerto, where he worked as a rice farmer, tree tapper, and/or cattle herder, and began planting land under the authority of Perhutani in the 1990s. He is working to restore a section of Mount Lawu, Wonogiri Regency, Central Java Province, Indonesia, which was denuded by a major forest fire in the 1960s. When he began trading his goats for banyan seeds, he was initially met with suspicion, accused of being an "animist," and deemed "crazy" by local residents. In addition to trading for banyan, he also obtained plant starts by exchanging 10 clove-tree seedlings for one teak seedling. He also raises jackfruit trees to trade. He has planted approximately 4,500 banyan. Now he is sometimes helped by other volunteers including a group of 30 who ride motorcycles.

Sadiman is sometimes called Mbah Sadiman, meaning Grandfather Sadiman. The area he has planted has been named Saruman's Forest (Hutan Sadiman) and is being developed as an ecotourism destination.
