= Pugung Raharjo =

Archaeological site in Lampung, Indonesia

Coordinates: 5.3020°S 105.5710°E

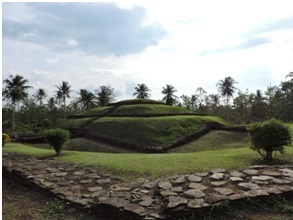
A Pyramid in Pugung Raharjo.

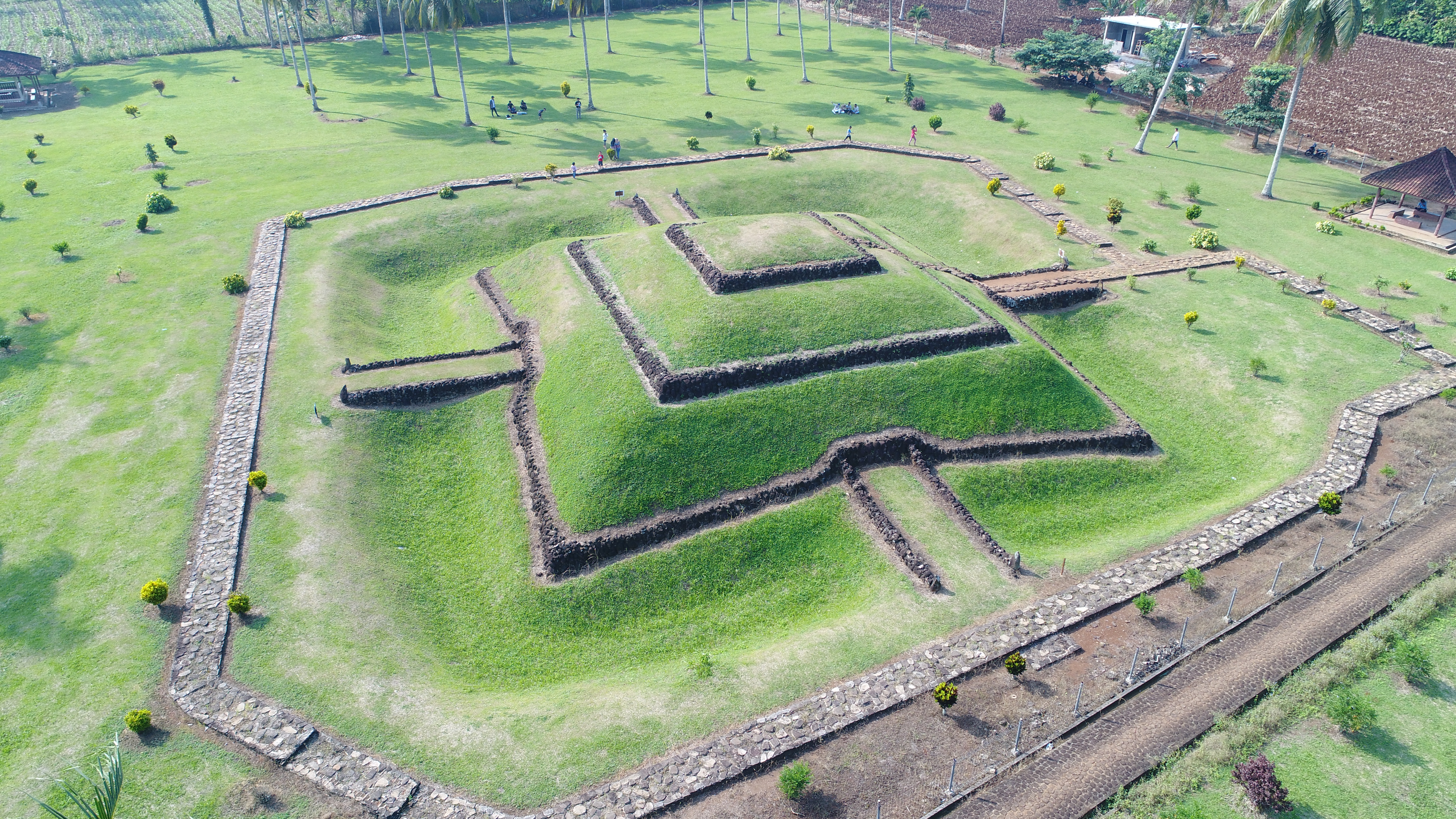
Aerial view of a pyramid from Pugung Raharjo megalithic site

Pugung Raharjo (sometimes called Pugungraharjo) is a 30 hectares archaeological site in the regency of East Lampung regency of Lampung Province in South Sumatra in Indonesia. The site was discovered in 1957. There is an ancient terraced megalithic structure, also known as Pugung Raharjo Pyramid. There other megalithic structures from the 12th to 16th century CE, including Menhirs and Dolmen, as well as prehistoric remains dating back to 2500 BC. It is locally known as the "Taman Purbakala Pugung Raharjo" (Pugung Raharjo Archaeological Park). It is situated approximately 50 km from the provincial capital, Bandar Lampung.

== History ==
The site was discovered by transmigrants in 1957. Research on the site started in 1968. Further research was conducted in 1973, 1975, 1977, and 1980. Viewed from chronological, artifacts, and features, the site was considered unique and variative. This is because many relics from megalithic (circa 2500 BC), Hindu-Buddhist, and Islamic period were found in the site. A bodhisattva sculpture found in the site showed that the site was repurposed as a Buddhist sacred place after the religion spread to Indonesia. Artifacts unearthed at the site suggest that the area was strongly under the influence of the Palembang-based Sriwijaya Empire. Finds of beads and Chinese porcelain indicate that the people of the area were also linked to international trade networks which visited the nearby Sunda Strait. The site was uncovered in the 1950s when transmigrants from Java and Bali moved into the area and started to clear the jungle. The site is now preserved as a national monument.

== Design ==
The site is surrounded by trenches and protective earthworks. The site was clearly a fortified community. This was probably to necessary to protect locals from attacks from pirates passing through the nearby Sunda Strait, a major waterway within ancient Indian Ocean trade networks. Within the walls is a cluster of phallic, stone megaliths. The most substantial remaining monument is a large, terraced earthwork temple. There are various smaller temple mounds within the walls. A small museum is the nearby village of Pugung Raharjo houses a collection of finds from the site, including some impressive statues that are often described as being 'Polynesian' in style.

== See also ==
Pyramid temples in Indonesia

- Candi Kethek, 5 terraces
- Lebak Cibedug, 9 terraces
- Candi Sukuh, 3 terraces

In Java

- Candi Ceto
- Candi of Indonesia
- Prambanan Temple, 6th-9th century UNESCO heritage Hindu temple in Central Java.
- Sunda Kingdom, 7th-16th century Indianised Hindu kingdom in Western and Central Java.
- Taruma Kingdom, 2nd-6th century Indianised Hindu kingdom of Western Java.

Other related topics

- Greater India
- Indianisation
- History of Indian influence on Southeast Asia
- Hinduism in Indonesia
- Buddhism in Indonesia
- List of places with columnar jointed volcanics
