= Candi Kethek =

Hindu temple in Java, Indonesia

Coordinates: 7°35′39″S 111°9′28″E

Candi Kethek Pyramid Hindu temple
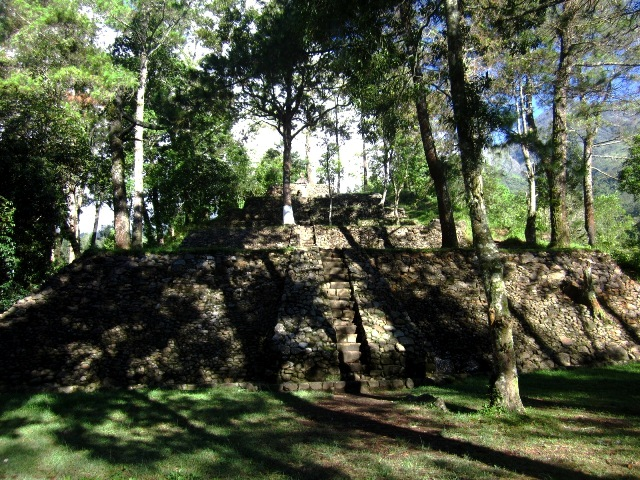
- Candi Kethek's pyramid shaped terraces

- Location within Java Candi Kethek (Indonesia)
- Location: Mount Lawu, Jenawi district, f Karanganyar Regency, Central Java, Indonesia.

History
- Built: Built by Mataram kingdom 15th-16th century

Candi Kethek is a terraced megalithic pyramid-shaped 15th-16th century Hindu temple on the northwest slope of Mount Lawu in Anggrasmanis village of Gumeng subdistrict in Jenawi district of Karanganyar Regency in Central Java of Indonesia. The temple has seven terraces facing west, each terrace is connected by stone steps. There is an alternative path to the top terrace on the south side. Kethek Temple is located northeast of the fifteenth-century Javanese-Hindu Ceto Temple. To reach Candi Kethek, visitors must take a 300 m footpath from Ceto Temple in the direction of the path leading to Puri Taman Saraswati.

== Etymology ==
Kethek in Javanese means monkey, the name given by residents to this temple because there used to be many monkeys in this area. Candi means Hindu temple built during the Zaman Hindu-Buddha or "Hindu-Buddhist period", between the 4th and 15th centuries.

== History ==
The existence of this temple has been reported since 1842. In 2005, excavations were carried out by the Central Java Archaeological Heritage Preservation Agency in collaboration with the Department of Archeology of Gadjah Mada University and the Karanganyar Regency Government. A statue of a tortoise, the incarnation of the Hindu deity Lord Vishnu, denoting Samudramanthana, was found on the lowest terrace, which confirmed that Candi Kethek is a Hindu place of worship. Research on the Kethek Temple is still ongoing to obtain more information history of the temple by studying the layout of the temple, and inscriptions and artifacts found at the site.

== Architecture ==
This temple is similar to the Ceto temple and 15th-century Javanese-Hindu Sukuh temple (candi) found in this area on the terraces, all of which are considered to be the hallmark of Megalith cultural heritage buildings in the archipelago. Based on this similarity, the time of Candi Kathek's establishment was estimated to be almost the same as the other two temples, i.e. around the 15th to 16th centuries CE.

On the first terrace of the temple, there is a building on the northeast side. The second and third terraces each have two buildings on the north and south sides. Whereas the fourth terrace, the top terrace, is thought to be the site of the main temple building, which is now has a small "stana" with a golden crown, clad in Balinese Poleng Fabric.

== See also ==
Pyramid temples in Indonesia

- Gunung Padang Megalithic Site, 5 terraces
- Lebak Cibedug, 9 terraces
- Pugung Raharjo, 5 terraces
- Candi Sukuh, 3 terraces

Related topics in Java

- Candi Ceto
- Candi of Indonesia
- Prambanan Temple, 6th-9th century UNESCO heritage Hindu temple in Central Java.
- Sunda Kingdom, 7th-16th century Indianised Hindu kingdom in Western and Central Java.
- Taruma Kingdom, 2nd-6th century Indianised Hindu kingdom of Western Java.

Other related topics

- Greater India
- Indianisation
- History of Indian influence on Southeast Asia
- Hinduism in Indonesia
- Buddhism in Indonesia
- List of places with columnar jointed volcanics
