= Astana Giribangun =

Mausoleum in Central Java, Indonesia

- أستانا جيريبانجون ꦄꦱ꧀ꦠꦤꦒꦶꦫꦶꦧꦔꦸꦤ꧀
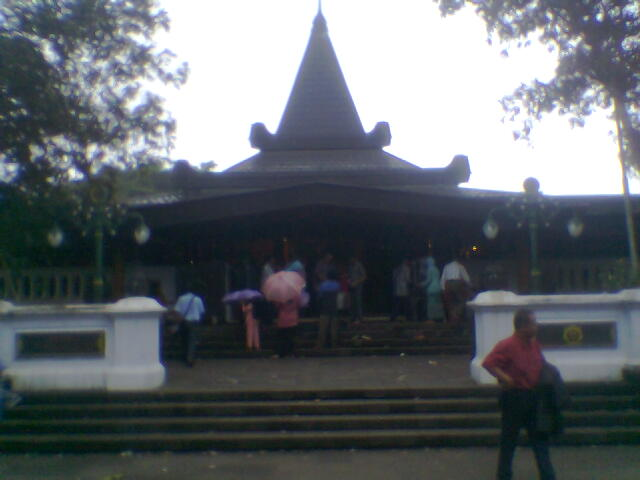
- Astana Giribangun in 2008
- Interactive map of Astana Giribangun
- Type: Mausoleum

Astana Giribangun (also "Giri Bangun") is a mausoleum complex for Suharto (former President of Indonesia) and his family. The mausoleum is located in Karang Bangun, Matesih, Karanganyar Regency, Central Java province. It is on the foot hills of Mount Lawu, approximately 35 kilometres east of the city of Surakarta. The archaic Javanese name translates as "Palace of the risen mountain".

The structure was built in a traditional Javanese architectural style and occupies parts of the Mangkunegaran Royal Cemetery complex. It is approximately 300 metres from the Astana Mangadeg, the burial sites of the Solonese royals Mangkunegara I, Mangkunegara II and Mangkunegara III.

The site was chosen because Suharto's wife, Mrs Tien Suharto, was related to the Mangkunegaran Royal household and a descendant of Mangkunegara III from her mother's side. Out of respect of the pre-existing royal tomb, the newly established Astana Giribangun was built at a lower plateau and does not sit higher than Astana Mangadeg. The Astana Mangadeg was considered to be in a location having special spiritual features by many of the spiritualists and soothsayers who practiced kejawen (or kebatinan) by meditating and drawing charisma from shakti (magic).

Former President Suharto was buried in Astana Giribangun on 29 January 2008 with full state military honours following his death the day before. President Susilo Bambang Yudhoyono presided over the ceremony. Suharto was buried beside his late wife, who died in April 1996.

In October 2010, in line with traditional Javanese practice, Suharto's family held a memorial ceremony at the Astana Giribangun 1,000 days after his death.
