= List of awards and honours received by Siti Hartinah =

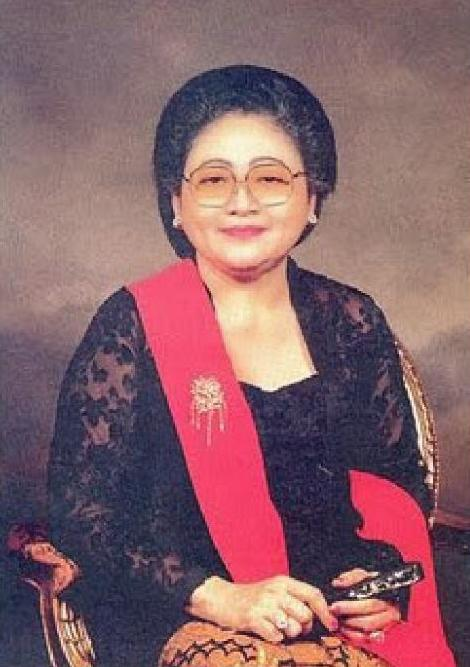
Siti Hartinah

Awards and honours received by Siti Hartinah, the wife of the second Indonesian president, Suharto and First Lady of Indonesia from 1967 until 1996, include:

== National honours ==
- Star of the Republic of Indonesia, 2nd Class (Indonesian: Bintang Republik Indonesia Adipradana) (10 March 1973)
- Guerrilla Star(Indonesian: Bintang Gerilya)
- Star of Culture Parama Dharma (Indonesian: Bintang Budaya Parama Dharma) (17 June 1992)

== International honours ==
- Brunei:
  - Recipient of the Most Esteemed Family Order of Laila Utama (DK) (1988)
- Cambodia:
  - Grand Cross of the Royal Order of Sowathara (1968)
- Malaysia:
  - Honorary Recipient of the Most Exalted Order of the Crown of the Realm (DMN) (1988)
- Philippines:
  - Grand Collar of the Order of the Golden Heart (GCGH) (1968)
- Thailand:
  - Dame Grand Cross of the Most Illustrious Order of Chula Chom Klao (DGC) (1970)
- Austria:
  - Grand Star (Groß-Stern) of the Decoration of Honour for Services to the Republic of Austria (1973)
- Netherlands:
  - Dame Grand Cross of the Order of the Crown (1970)
- Ethiopian Empire:
  - Grand Cordon and Collar of the Order of the Queen of Sheba (1968)
- Japan:
  - Grand Cordon of the Order of the Precious Crown (1968)
- Germany:
  - Grand Cross Special Class of the Order of Merit of the Federal Republic of Germany
- Kuwait:
  - First Class of the Order of Kuwait (1977)
- South Korea:
  - Recipient of the Grand Order of Mugunghwa (1981)
- Egypt:
  - Supreme Class of the Order of the Virtues (Nishan al-Kamal) (1977)
- France:
  - Grand Cross of the National Order of Merit (Ordre national du Mérite)
- Romania:
  - The First Class of the Order of Tudor Vladimirescu (1982)
- Spain:
  - Dame Grand Cross of the Order of Isabella the Catholic (gcYC) (1980)
- Syria:
  - Member 1st Class of the Order of the Umayyads (1977)
- Venezuela:
  - Grand Cordon with Collar of the Order of the Liberator (1988)
- Jordan:
  - Grand Cordon of the Supreme Order of the Renaissance (1986)
- Yugoslavia:
  - Yugoslav Star with Sash of the Order of the Yugoslav Star (1975)
