= Siti Hartinah =

First Lady of Indonesia from 1967 until 1996

Raden Ayu Siti Hartinah
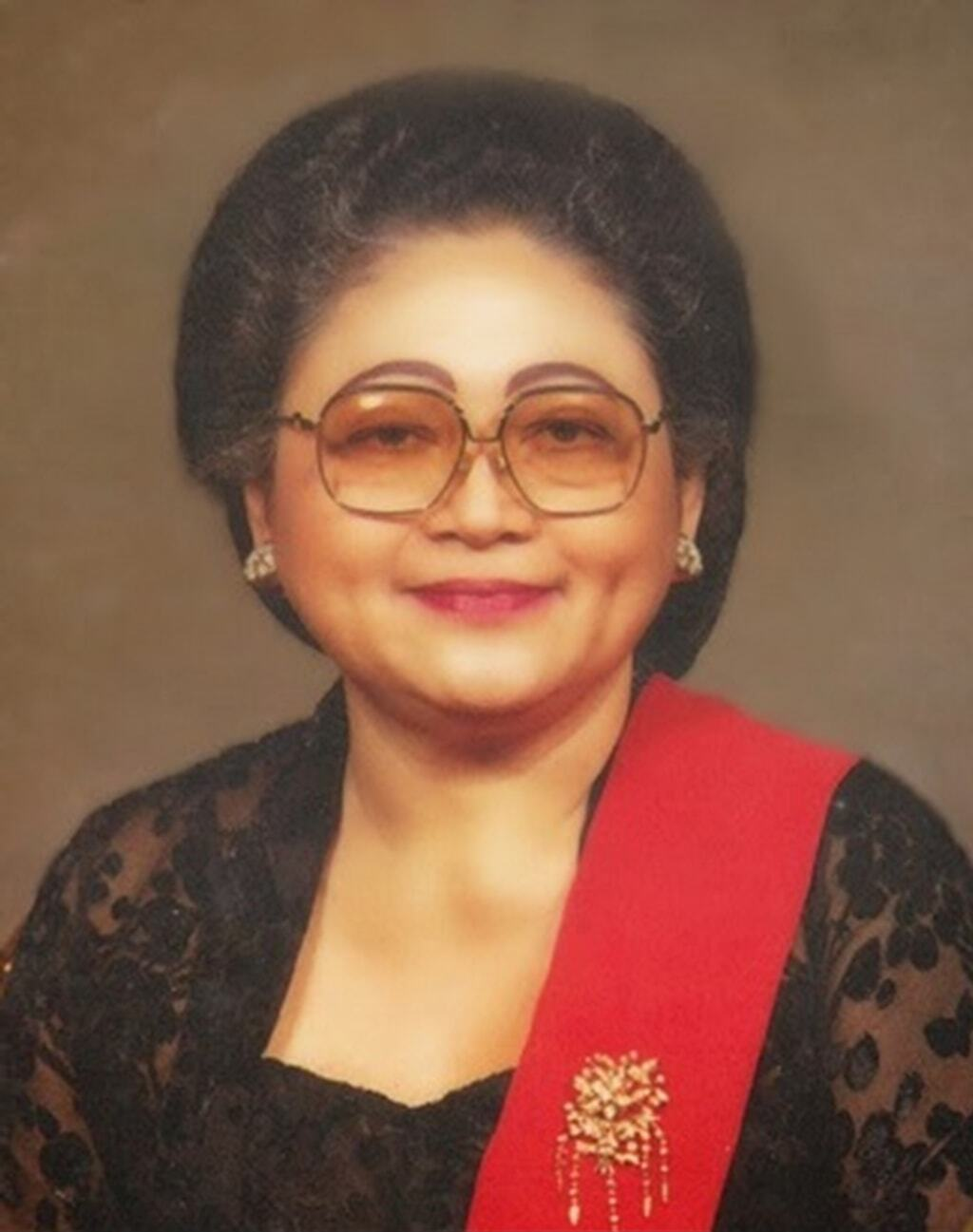
- Official portrait, 1993

First Lady of Indonesia
- In role 12 March 1967 – 28 April 1996
- President: Suharto
- Preceded by: Fatmawati
- Succeeded by: Siti Hardiyanti Rukmana (acting); Hasri Ainun Habibie

Personal details
- Born: 23 August 1923 Soerakarta, Dutch East Indies
- Died: 28 April 1996 (aged 72) Jakarta, Indonesia
- Resting place: Astana Giribangun
- Spouse: Suharto (m. 1947)
- Children: 6, including Tutut, Titiek, and Tommy Suharto
- Parents: Sumoharyomo (father); Hatmanti Hatmohudoyo (mother)
- Awards: Awards and honours
- Nickname: Ibu Tien

Raden Ayu Siti Hartinah (23 August 1923 – 28 April 1996), also known as Siti Hartinah Suharto or Tien Suharto, was the first lady of Indonesia from 1967 until her death in 1996, as the wife of Indonesian president Suharto. She is popularly known as Ibu Tien in Indonesia.

== Early life ==
Siti Hartinah was born in Surakarta (known colloquially as Solo), Central Java to Sumoharyomo and Hatmanti Hatmohudoyo, (Note: Also spelt Soemoharjomo and Hatmohoedojo, respectively) in 1923. She was the second daughter of eleven siblings. (Note: Some sources, such as Roeder (1976), state that she was the second daughter of nine siblings. Siti Hartinah's parents had 11 children, however two died during childhood. The nine siblings so referred to were those who lived past adulthood.) Her family were part of the Surakarta nobility and were related to the Mangkunegaran royal household. Her father was a Wedana, an official in the Mankunegara court and held the noble title Kanjeng Pangeran Haryå (KPH). Her mother was a descendant of Mangkunegara III and held the title Kanjeng Raden Ayu (K.R.Ay). At that time, employees of the royal court (Kraton) had to have royal blood.

In her youth, Siti Hartinah had always wanted to become a doctor. However, being a woman in a country that was under Dutch colonial rule, and a traditional Javanese environment, meant limited opportunities. Though they were a prominent and respected family, they were far from rich. She received basic education from Hollandsch-Inlandsche School (HIS), but her family could not afford to send Siti Hartinah to further her education, as had been given to her older sister.

When her father retired, her younger siblings were still very young. To help alleviate the financial burdens of such a large family, she looked for opportunities to supplement the family income, even though at that time it was still unusual for a young woman to work outside the home. She was fond of and was very good at Javanese arts, batik making and dyeing. She was able to sell these batik creations and used the proceeds to pay for typing classes.

During the Japanese occupation, she joined Fujinkai (women's group), which was the only permissible women's organization by the Japanese government. When Indonesia declared Independence in 1945 and the ensuing fight for independence occurred, like other young, patriotic women at that time, she enlisted in Laskar Puteri and worked for the Indonesian Red Cross.

== Marriage to Suharto ==
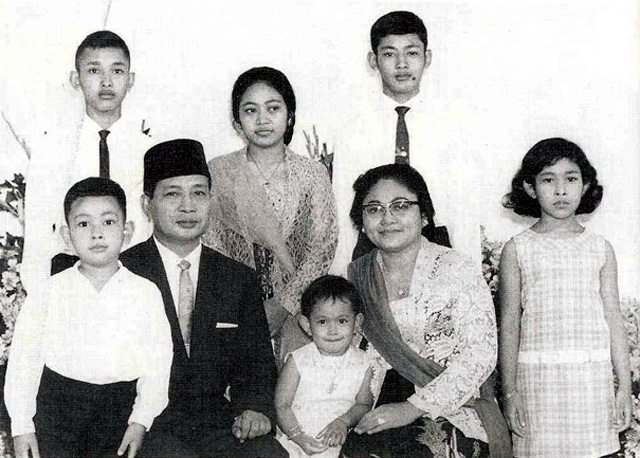
Siti Hartinah with Suharto and six children, c. 1967

Siti Hartinah’s marriage to Suharto was initiated by Suharto's foster mother, Mrs Prawirowiharjo. At that time, Suharto held the rank of Lieutenant Colonel in the Indonesian Army where he was stationed in Yogyakarta. Siti Hartinah and Suharto had previously met when she attended the same school with one of Suharto’s cousins in Wonogiri.

A ceremony known as nontoni (a meeting for a young man to formally propose to a woman) was arranged. Suharto himself doubted if her parents would be ready to give their daughter's hand to a commoner. "After all, they were priyayi." Suharto also felt uncomfortable as he had not seen Hartinah for a long time and was not sure if she would like him. Nonetheless, Siti Hartinah’s parents appeared to have no objections and consented to have Suharto as their son-in-law.

Siti Hartinah married Suharto on 26 December 1947 in Surakarta. Suharto was 26, Siti Hartinah was 24. The afternoon wedding was attended by many of Siti Hartinah’s family and friends. However, from the groom’s side, only two family members were able to attend. The evening’s reception was lit only by candlelight, as the city was on blackout alert in the event the Dutch would resume air raids.

Suharto stated that the marriage was initially not one of romantic love, but they did eventually grow to love each other devotedly, a type of marriage that was very common for many Javanese of that era. Three days after their wedding, the newly wedded couple moved to Yogyakarta in order for Suharto to return to his military duties.

It was characteristic of a military family’s life that three of their children were born when her husband was on duty and away from his family. Their first child was born when Suharto was fighting in a guerrilla war outside of Yogyakarta. Her husband did not see their first daughter for three months after her birth. Their second child, a son, was born while Suharto was serving in South Sulawesi. Another, their fifth child (and third son), was born when he was leading the Mandala Command for the Liberation of West Irian.

== First Lady of Indonesia ==
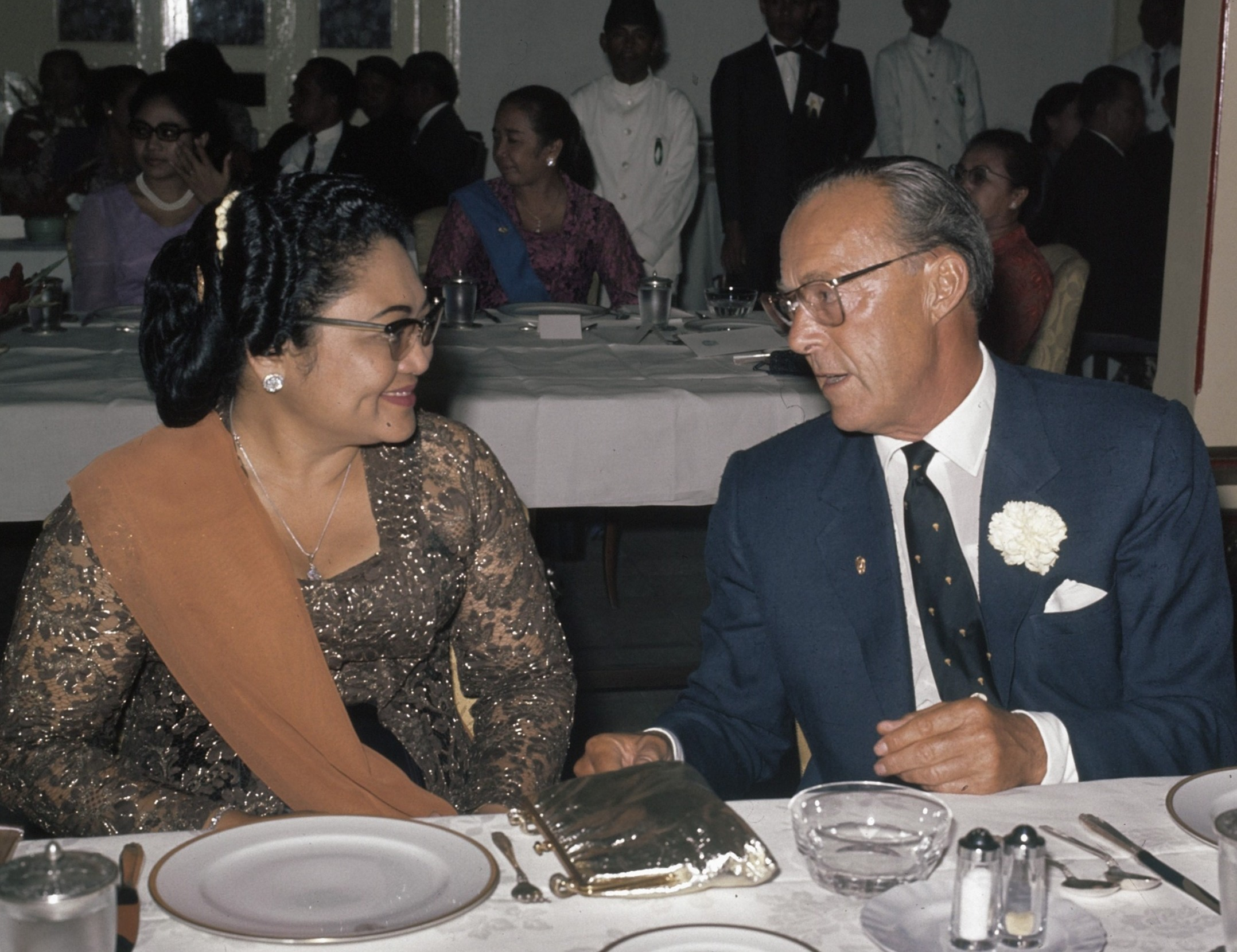
Siti Hartinah and Bernhard of Lippe-Biesterfeld in 1971

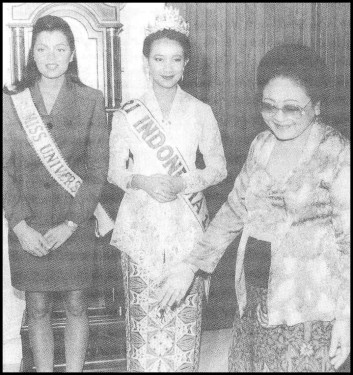
Indonesian First Lady Siti Hartinah (right), together with Puteri Indonesia 1996 Alya Rohali (middle) and Miss Universe 1996, Alicia Machado of Venezuela (left) at Jalan Cendana.

Siti Hartinah became known in Indonesia as "Madame Tien" (Ibu Tien). She was widely acknowledged to have been politically powerful, and a close confidant and political advisor to Suharto.

=== Family life ===
When Suharto was first inaugurated as president, the couple decided not to make Merdeka Palace their private residence. They moved instead from Jalan Haji Agus Salim (the street where they first lived in Jakarta) to Jalan Cendana in the suburb of Menteng. The Cendana house itself was not a picture of luxury. One of the main reasons for the move was security. There was a high-rise building behind the house in Haji Agus Salim. Merdeka Palace had not been Suharto’s choice because he wanted his children to have freedom. At that time, their children were still young with the oldest at 18 years while their youngest was only 3 years old.

=== Pramuka ===
During her time as First Lady, Siti Hartinah was highly active and made many contributions to the Pramuka Movement (Pramuka), the national scouting organization of Indonesia. She was Vice Chairperson of the National Branch (Kwartir Nasional) for five successive terms, from 1970 to 1993. In the early 1970s, she initiated the establishment of a national pramuka camping grounds in Cibubur, East Jakarta. This camping ground, at around 210 hectares in size, is known as Bumi Perkemahan Wiladatika Cibubur. In addition, she spearheaded the construction of the National Headquarters of Pramuka located across from the National Monument in Jakarta.

=== Family planning program ===
When the Indonesian government launched its family planning program in the early 1970s, Suharto and Siti Hartinah travelled around the country to promote the benefits of family planning. The program, administrated by Badan Koordinasi Keluarga Berencana Nasional (the Family Planning Co-ordinating Board), combined outreach methods, education, and expanded access to several methods of birth control. Suharto and Siti Hartinah provided the program with funding and moral support.

== Death ==
Siti Hartinah died of heart failure on 28 April 1996 in Jakarta. She was interred in Astana Giribangun mausoleum complex in Karanganyar Regency, Central Java. She was posthumously rendered a National Hero of Indonesia. When Suharto died in 2008, he was interred next to his late wife.

== Family ==
Suharto and Siti Hartinah had six children: Siti Hardiyanti Rukmana (Tutut), Sigit Harjojudanto (Sigit), Bambang Trihatmodjo (Bambang), Siti Hediyati Hariyadi (Titiek), Hutomo Mandala Putra (Tommy) and Siti Hutami Endang Adiningsih (Mamiek).

== See also ==
- List of awards and honours received by Siti Hartinah

== Notes ==
Honorary titles
Preceded by Fatmawati	First Lady of Indonesia; 12 March 1967 – 28 April 1996	Succeeded by Siti Hardiyanti Rukmana (acting); Hasri Ainun Habibie
