= Sukuh =

15th century Javanese Hindu temple

Coordinates: 7°37′38″S 111°7′52″E

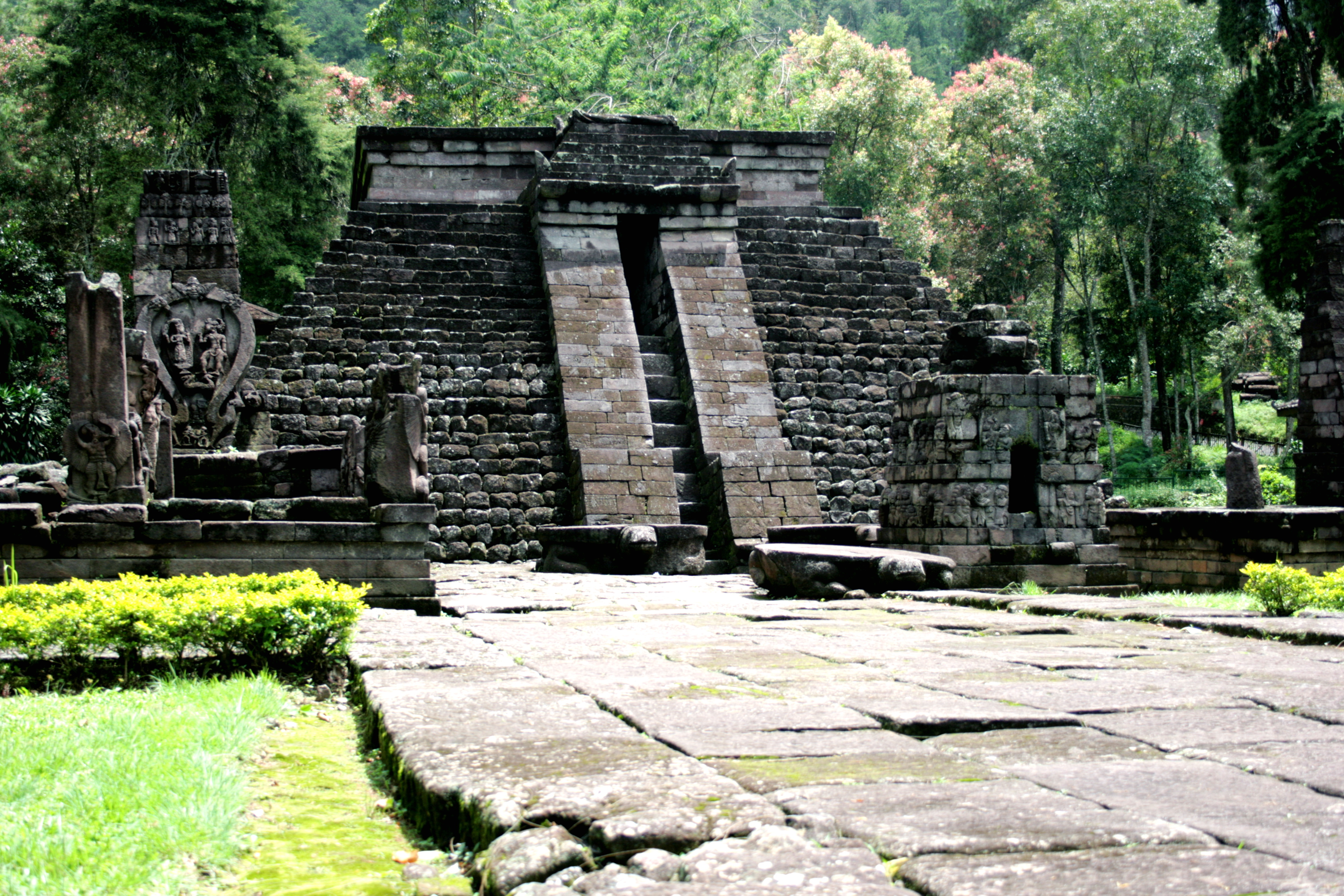
The main monument of Sukuh temple.

Sukuh (Indonesian: Candi Sukuh, Indonesian pronunciation: [ˌtʃandi ˈsukʊh]) is a 15th-century Javanese-Hindu temple (candi) that is located in Berjo, Ngargoyoso district, Karanganyar Regency, Central Java, Indonesia on the western slope of Mount Lawu (elevation 910 metres (2,990 ft)). This temple has a height of 8.7 metres (29 ft). Sukuh temple has a distinctive thematic relief from other candi where life before birth and sexual education are its main themes. Its main monument is a simple pyramid structure with reliefs and statues in front of it, including three tortoises with flattened shells and a male figure grasping his penis. A giant 1.82 m (6 ft) high of Shishna with four testes, representing penile incisions, was one of the statues that has been relocated to the National Museum of Indonesia.

== Background ==
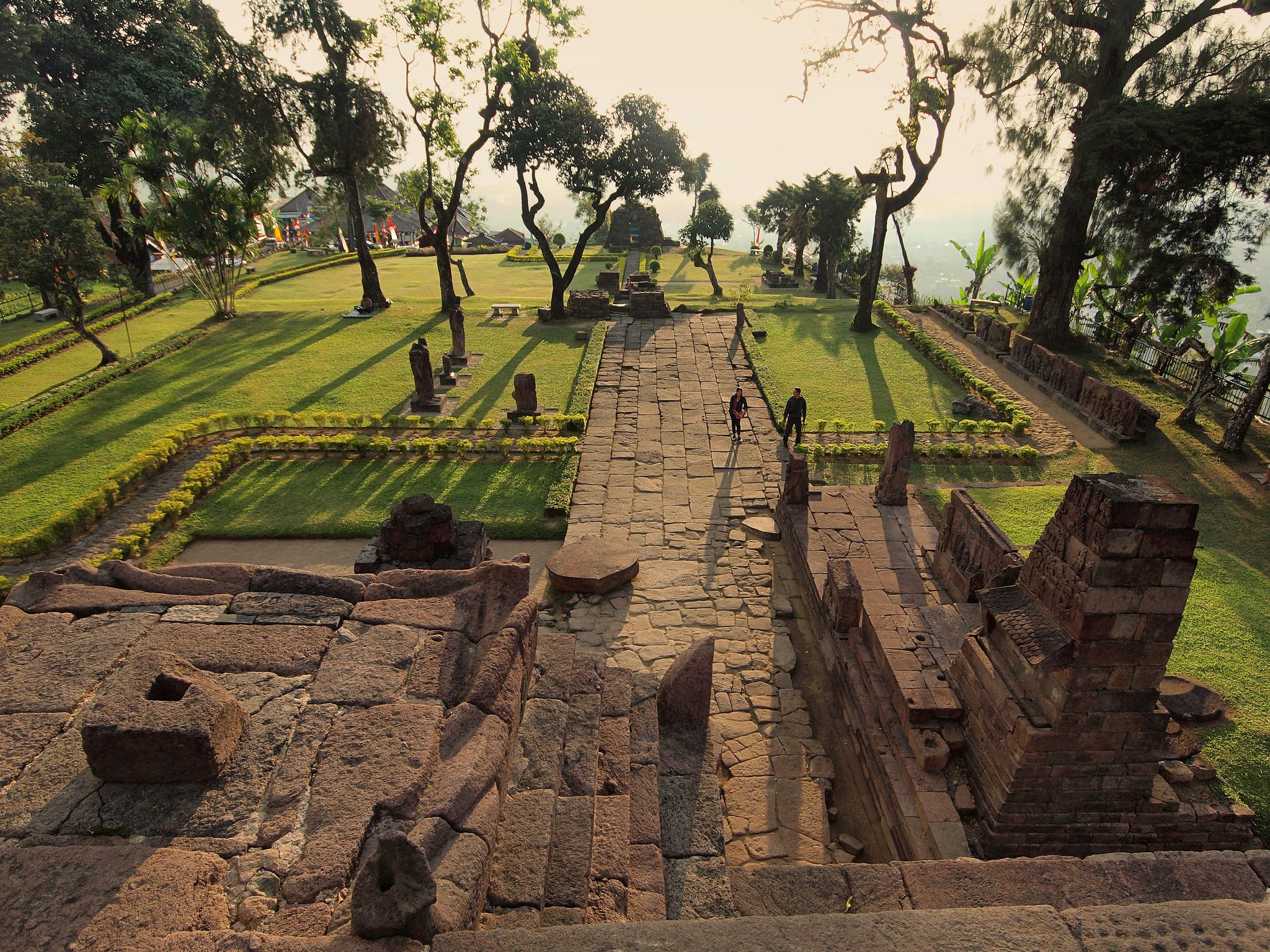
Temple grounds

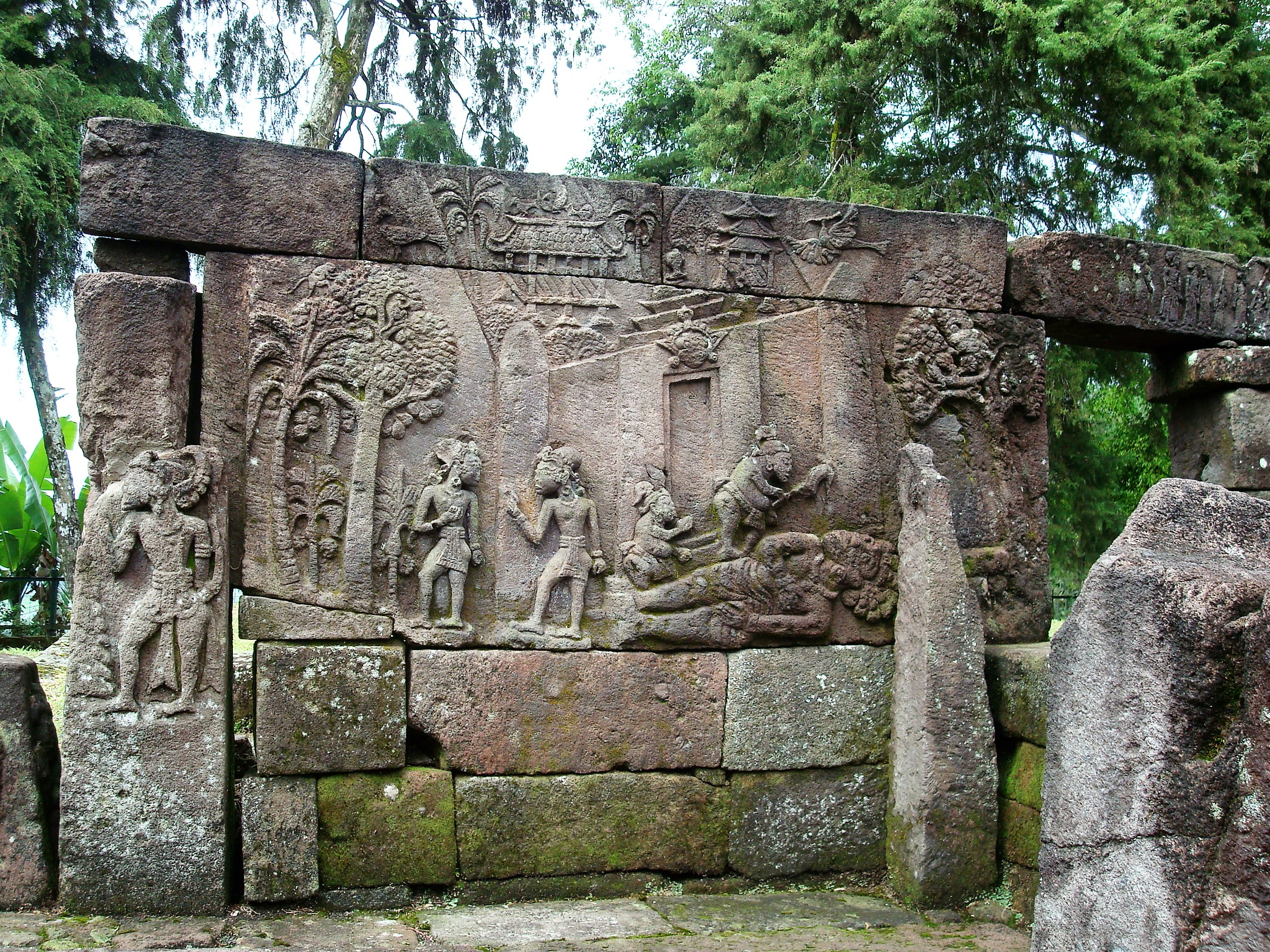
Reliefs at Candi Sukuh

Sukuh is one of several temples built on the northwest slopes of Mount Lawu in the 15th century. By this time, Javanese religion and art had diverged from Indian precepts that had been so influential on temple styles during the 8th–10th centuries. This was the last significant area of temple building in Java before the island's courts were converted to Islam in the 16th century. It is difficult for historians to interpret the significance of these antiquities due to the temple's distinctiveness and the lack of records of Javanese ceremonies and beliefs of the era.

The founder of Candi Sukuh thought that the slope of Mount Lawu was a sacred place for worshiping the ancestors and nature spirits and for observance of the fertility cults. The monument was built around 1437, as written as a chronogram date on the western gate, meaning that the area was under the rule of the Majapahit Kingdom during its end (1293–1500). Some archaeologists believe the founder had cast the fall of Majapahit, based on the reliefs that display the feud between two aristocratic houses, symbolizing two internal conflicts in the kingdom.

In 1815, Sir Thomas Raffles, the ruler of Java from 1811–1816, visited the temple and found it in bad condition. In his account, many statues had been thrown down on the ground and most of the figures had been decapitated. Raffles also found the giant lingga statue broken into two pieces, which were then glued together.

== Architecture ==
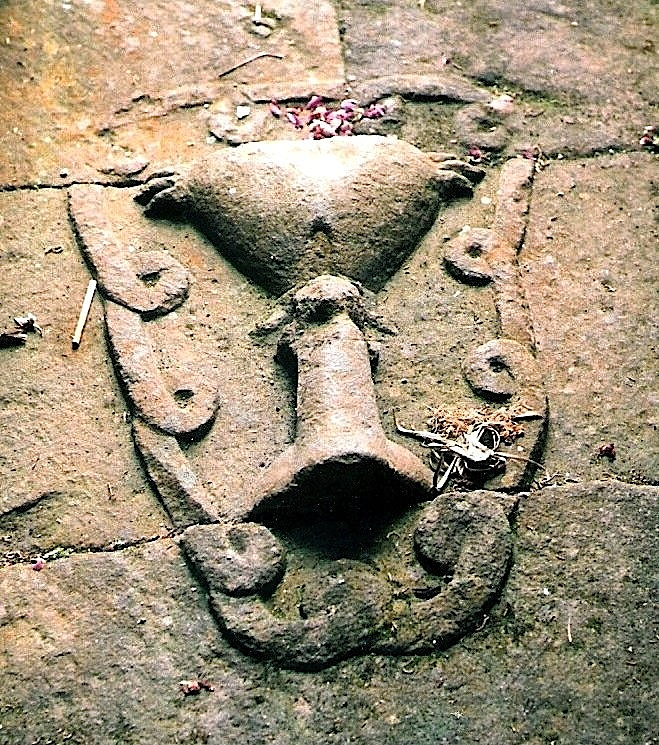
Yoni–lingga on the floor of the temple entrance

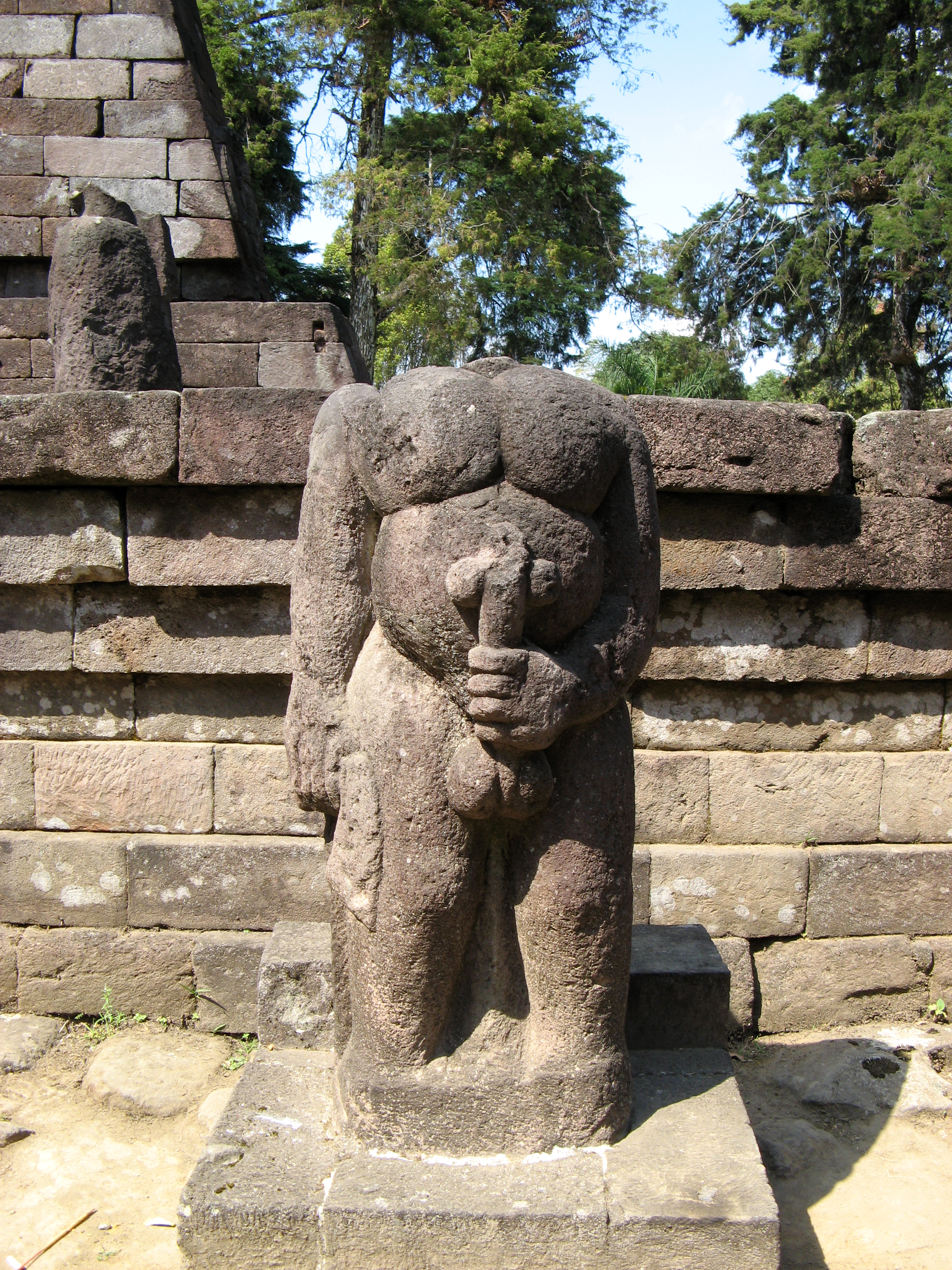
Life-sized male figure grasping penis

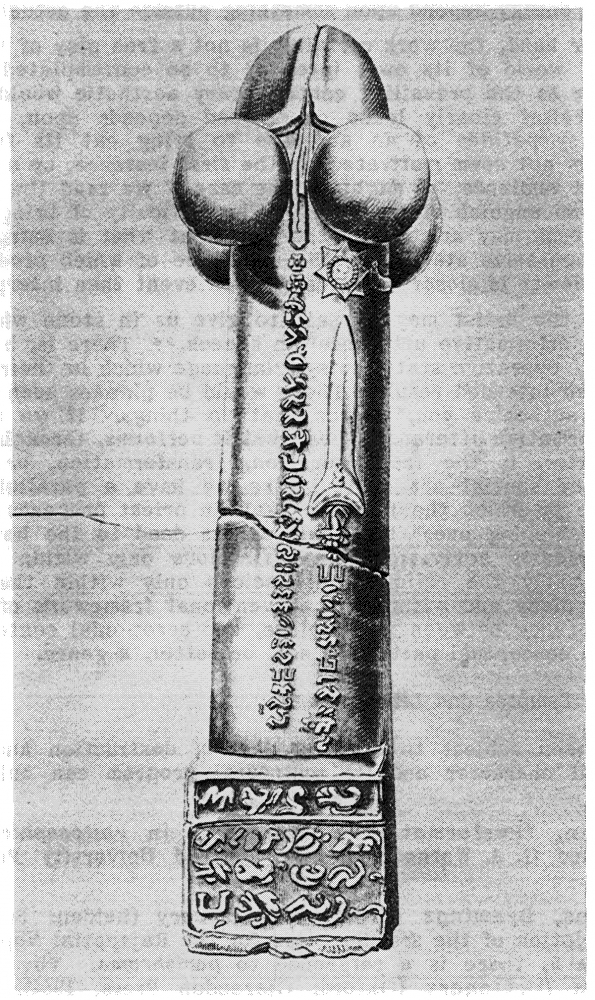
1.82 m lingga statue symbolizing Shiva’s generative power and fertility. Features four testicles, carvings of a kris blade, sun, moon, and 1440 date. Inscription reads: “This is the sign of masculinity: may all living beings be happy.” Now at the National Museum of Indonesia.

The central pyramid of the complex sits at the rear of the highest of three terraces. Originally, worshippers would have accessed the complex through a gateway at the western or lowest terrace. To the left of the gate is a carving of a monster eating a man, birds in a tree, and a dog, which is thought to be a chronogram representing 1437 CE, the likely date of the temple's consecration. There is an obvious depiction of sexual intercourse in relief on the floor at the entrance where it shows a paired lingam which is represented physiologically by the phallus and yoni, which is represented bodily by the vulva. Genitalia is portrayed on several statues from the site, which is unique among Javanese classical monuments.

The main structure of the Sukuh temple is a truncated pyramid surrounded by monoliths and meticulously carved life-sized figures. The Sukuh temple does not follow the Hindu architecture of Wastu Vidya because it was built after the Hindu religion had weakened. Temples usually have a rectangular or square shape, but the Sukuh temple is a trapezium with three terraces, with one terrace higher than the others. A stone stairway rises through the front side of the pyramid to its summit. It is not known what the monument's unique shape was intended to symbolize. One suggestion is that it represents a mountain. There is no evidence that the main building supported a wooden structure. The only object recovered from its summit was a 1.82-metre lingga statue bearing an inscription, which is now in the National Museum of Indonesia. The statue may once have stood on the platform over the stairway. The lingga statue has a dedicated inscription carved from top to bottom representing a vein followed by a chronogram date equivalent to 1440. The inscription translates "Consecration of the Holy Ganges sudhi in ... the sign of masculinity is the essence of the world." Reliefs of a kris blade, an eight-pointed sun, and a crescent moon decorate the statue.

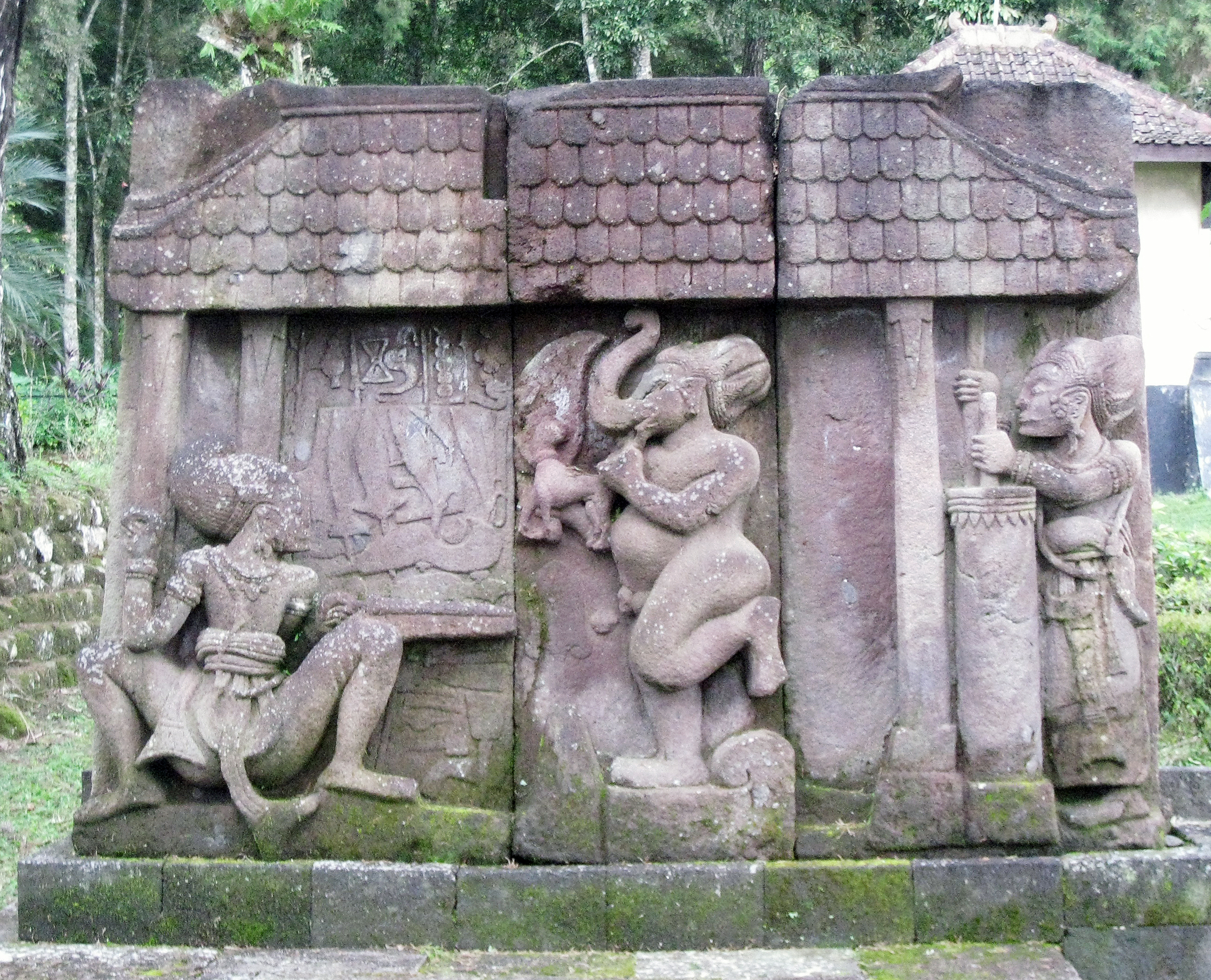
Relief of Bhima (left) as the blacksmith, Ganesha (center), and Arjuna (right) blowing air into the furnace with a tube

The wall of the main monument has a relief portraying two men forging a weapon in a smithy with a dancing figure of Ganesha, the most important Tantric deity, having a human body and the head of an elephant. In Hindu-Java mythology, the smith is thought to possess not only the skill to alter metals but also the key to spiritual transcendence. Smiths drew their powers to forge a kris from the god of fire and a smithy is considered as a shrine. Hindu-Javanese kingship was sometimes legitimated and empowered by the possession of a kris.

The elephant head figure with a crown in the smithy relief depicts Ganesha, the god who removes obstacles in Hinduism. The Ganesha figure, however, differs in some small respects from other usual depictions. Instead of sitting, the Ganesha figure in Candi Sukuh's relief is shown dancing and it has distinctive features including the exposed genitalia, the demonic physiognomy, the strangely awkward dancing posture, the rosary bones on its neck and holding a small animal, probably a dog. The Ganesha relief in Candi Sukuh has a similarity with the Tantric ritual found in the history of Buddhism in Tibet written by Taranatha. The Tantric ritual is associated with several figures, one of whom is described as the "King of Dogs" (Sanskrit: Kukuraja), who taught his disciples by day, and by night performed Ganacakra in a burial ground or charnel ground.

Other statues in Candi Sukuh include a life-sized male figure with his hand grasping his own penis and three flattened shells of tortoises. Two large tortoise statues guard the pyramid entrance and the third one lies at some distance in front of the monument. All of their heads point to the west and their flattened shells may provide altars for purification rituals and ancestor worship. In Hindu mythology, the tortoise symbolizes the base or support of the World and is an avatar of Vishnu, i.e. Kurma refers to Ocean of Milk.

== Gallery ==
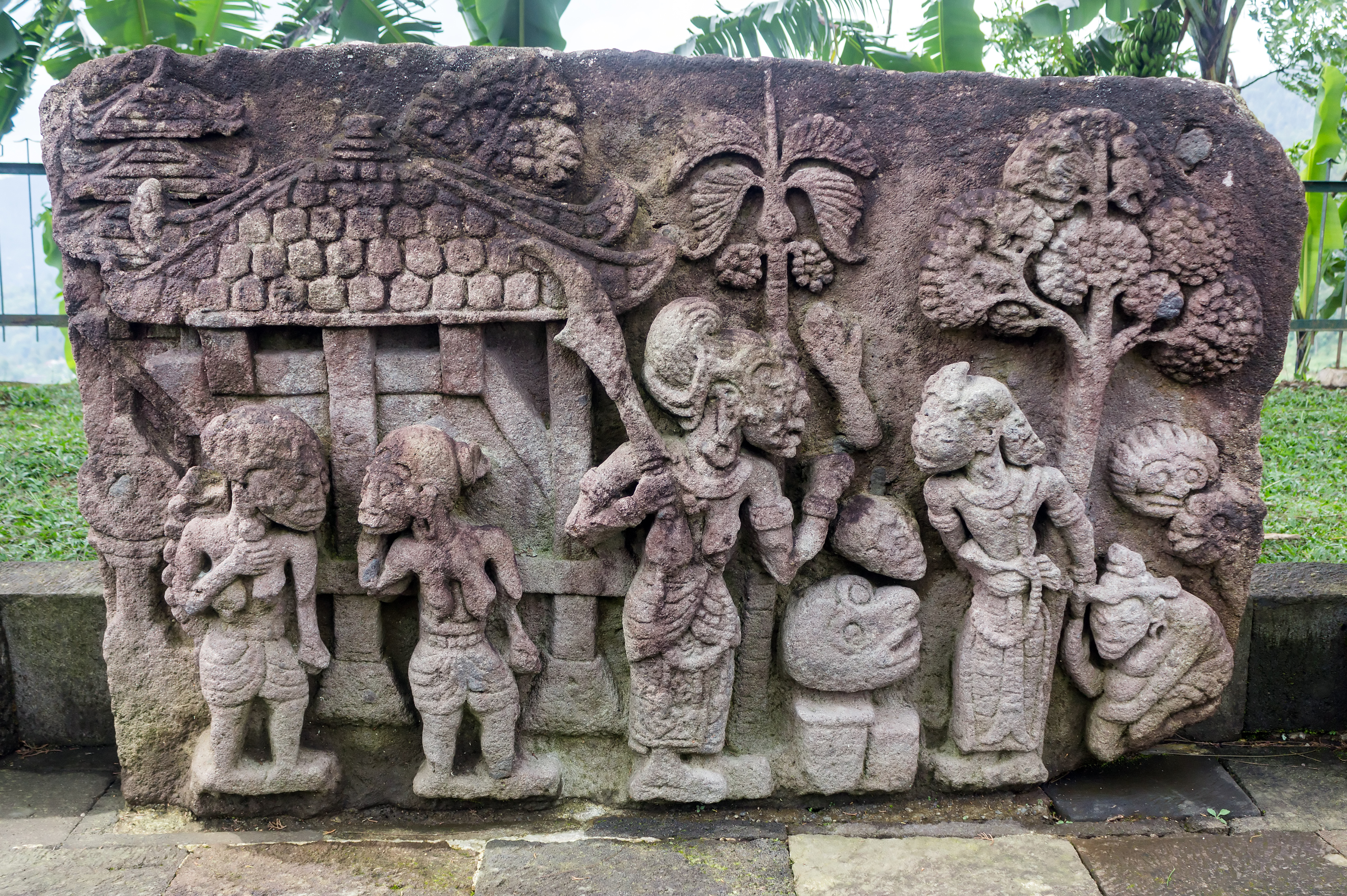

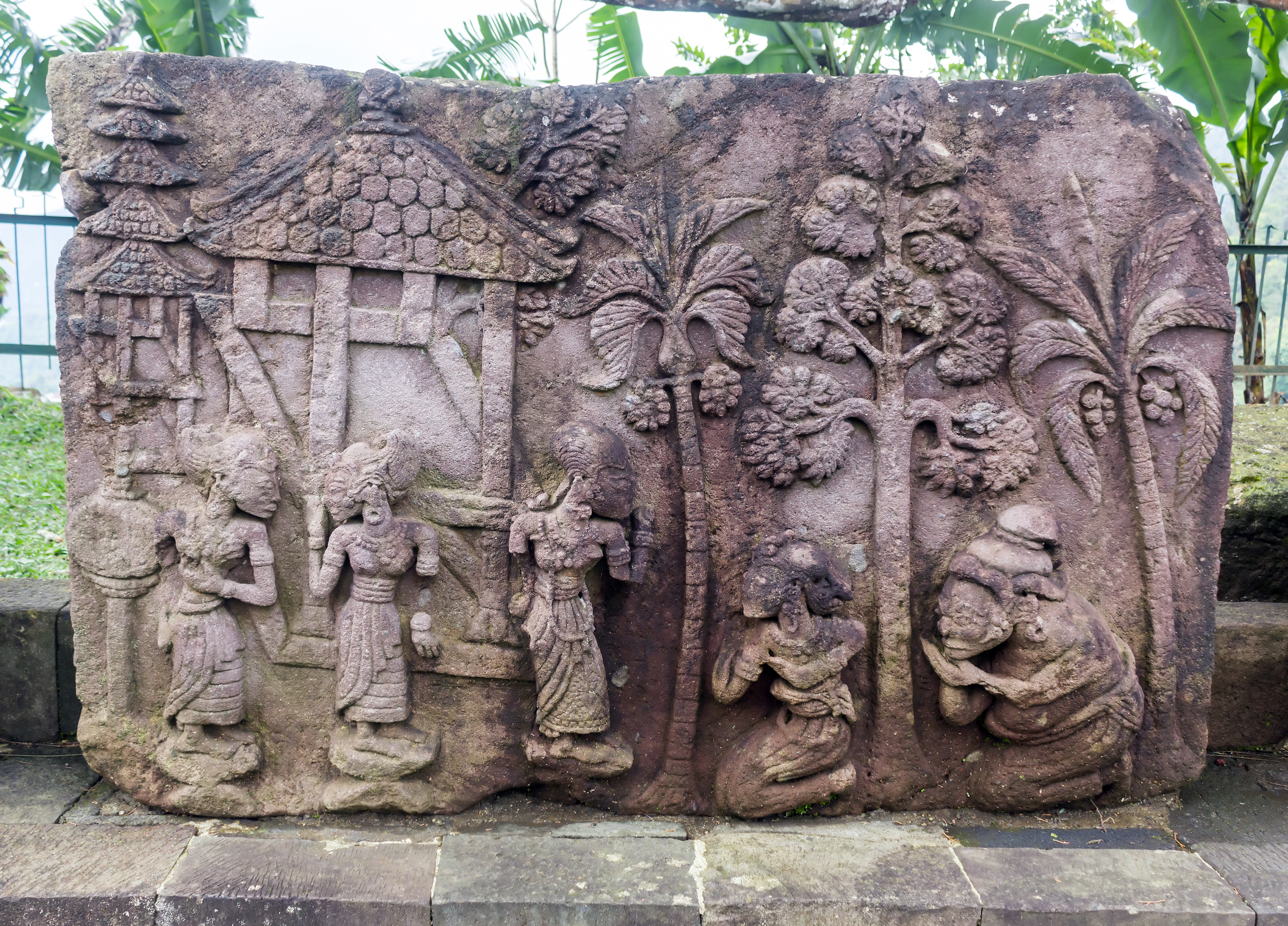

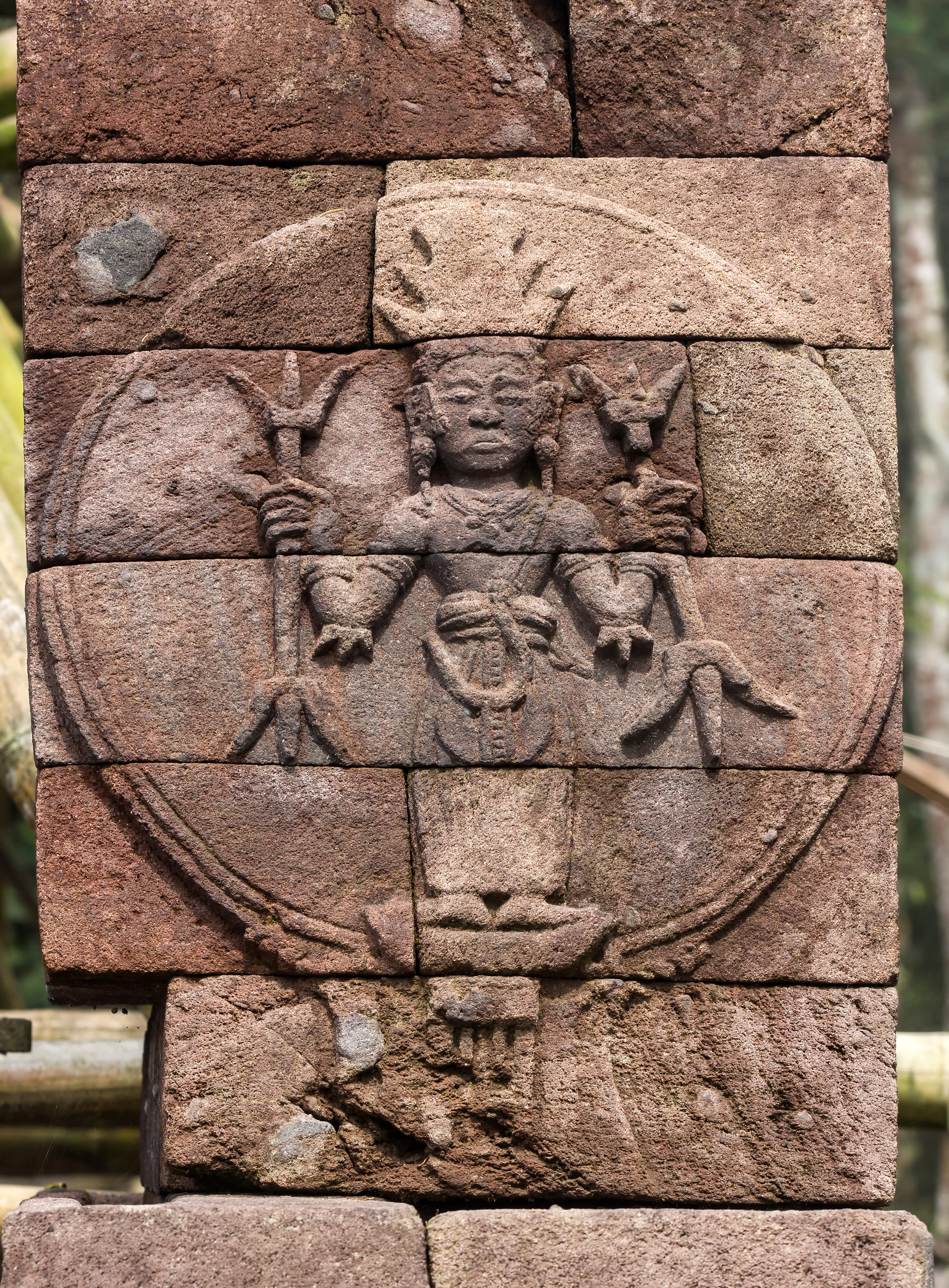

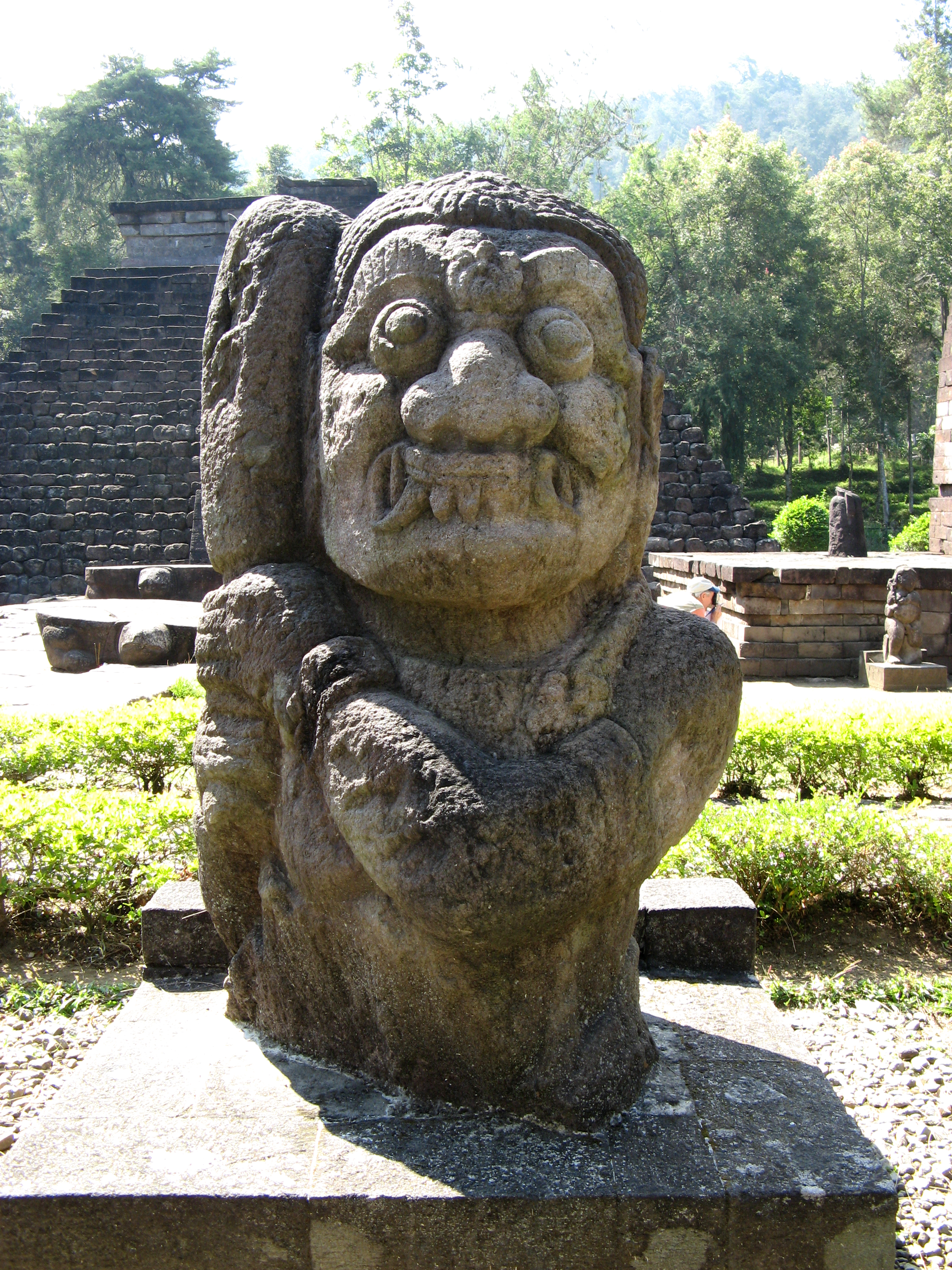

== See also ==
Pyramid temples in Indonesia

- Candi Kethek, 5 terraces
- Lebak Cibedug, 9 terraces
- Pugung Raharjo, 5 terraces

In Java

- Candi Ceto
- Candi of Indonesia
- Prambanan Temple, 6th-9th century UNESCO heritage Hindu temple in Central Java.
- Sunda Kingdom, 7th-16th century Indianised Hindu kingdom in Western and Central Java.
- Taruma Kingdom, 2nd-6th century Indianised Hindu kingdom of Western Java.

Other related topics

- Greater India
- Indianisation
- History of Indian influence on Southeast Asia
- Hinduism in Indonesia
- Buddhism in Indonesia
- List of places with columnar jointed volcanics
