= Karanganyar =

Karanganyar may refer to:

- Karanganyar Regency, a regency of Central Java, Indonesia
- Karanganyar, Karanganyar, town, district and the capital of Karanganyar Regency, Indonesia
- Karanganyar, Kebumen, town and district in Kebumen Regency, Indonesia
- Karanganyar, Demak, town and district in Demak Regency, Indonesia
- Karanganyar, Ngawi, town and district in Ngawi Regency, Indonesia
- Karanganyar, Pekalongan, town and district in Pekalongan Regency, Indonesia
- Karanganyar, Purbalingga, town and district in Purbalingga Regency, Indonesia
- Karang Anyar, Sawah Besar, the village of South Jakarta, Indonesia
