= Pura Dalem Segara Madhu =

Hindu temple in Bali, Indonesia

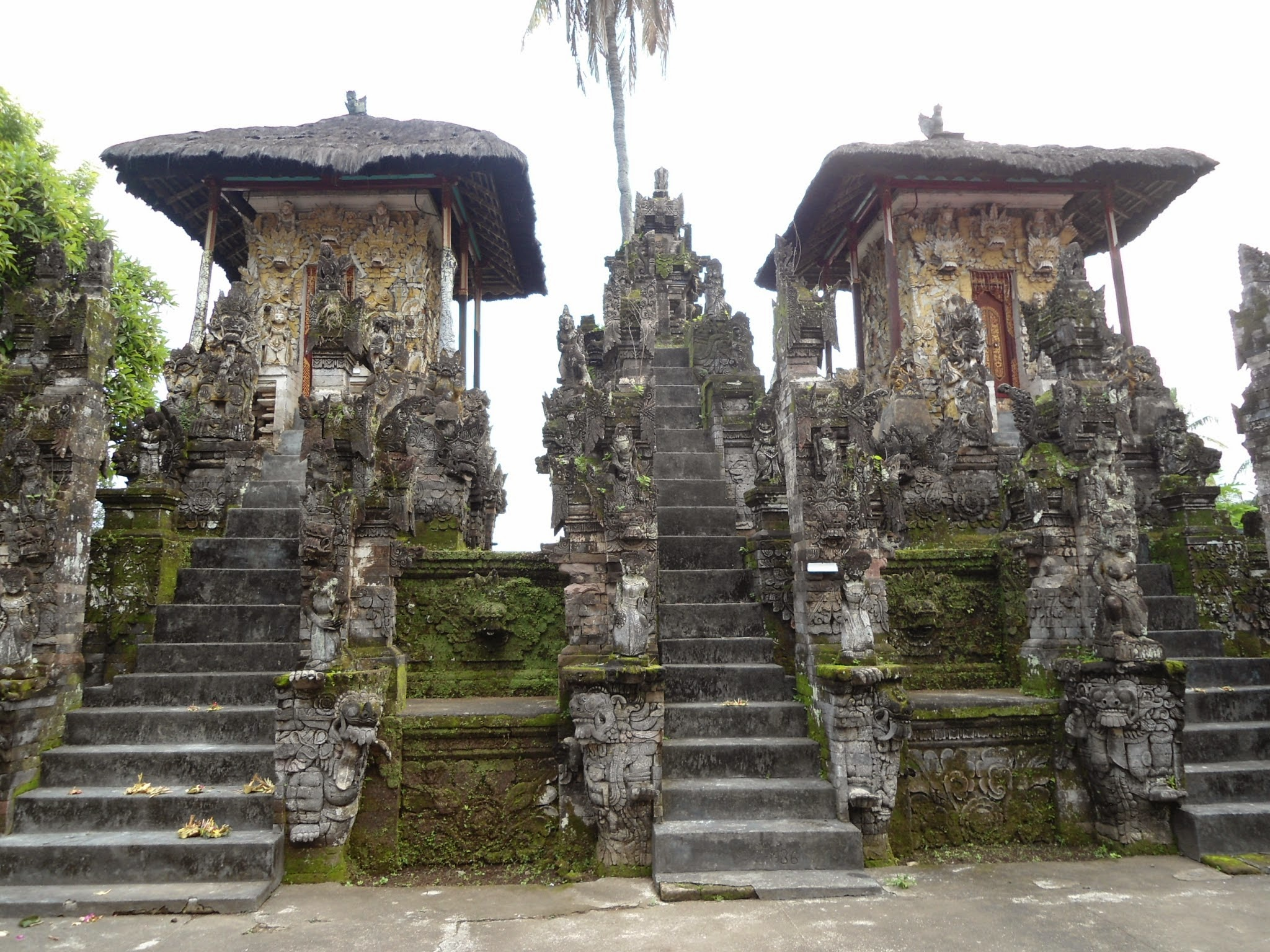
- The main shrines of Pura Dalem Segara Madhu
- Interactive map of the Pura Dalem Segara Madhu area
- Alternative names: Pura Dalem Jagaraga

General information
- Type: Pura
- Architectural style: Balinese
- Location: Jagaraga, Sawan Subdistrict, Buleleng, Bali, Indonesia
- Coordinates: 8°06′21″S 115°09′39″E
- Estimated completion: 12th-century
- Renovated: 1865

Pura Dalem Segara Madhu also known as Pura Dalem Jagaraga is a northern Balinese Hindu temple or pura located in the village of Jagaraga, Buleleng in northern Bali. It is about 11 km east of Singaraja. The village of Jagaraga is known historically as the place where the Dutch colonial government witnesses puputan or Balinese mass-suicide following their military attack on the kingdom of Bali in 1849. Pura Dalem Segara Madhu is known for its intensive wall decoration typical of northern Balinese architecture and for its unique western-influenced reliefs featuring early 20th-century airplanes and automobiles.

== History ==
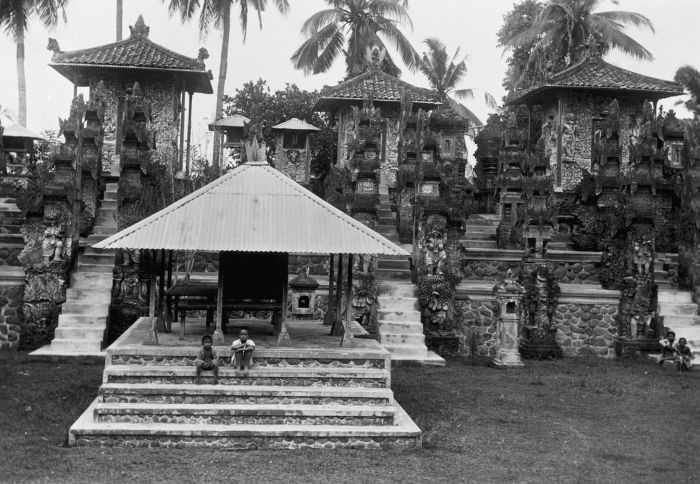
The inner courtyard of Pura Dalem Segara Madhu in the early 20th century.

The establishment of Pura Dalem Segara Madhu was estimated to be in the 12th century according to Raja Sri Aji Jayaraga. During the Dutch intervention of Bali in 1849, the entire palace and temple complex were destroyed by the Dutch military. The rebuilding of the pura began in 1865; this building still stands today. The pura was designed as a combination of Pura Prajapati and Pura Dalem, each dedicated to Durga and Shiva. The combination of both temples is possible because the deities are still one family.

== Northern Balinese style ==
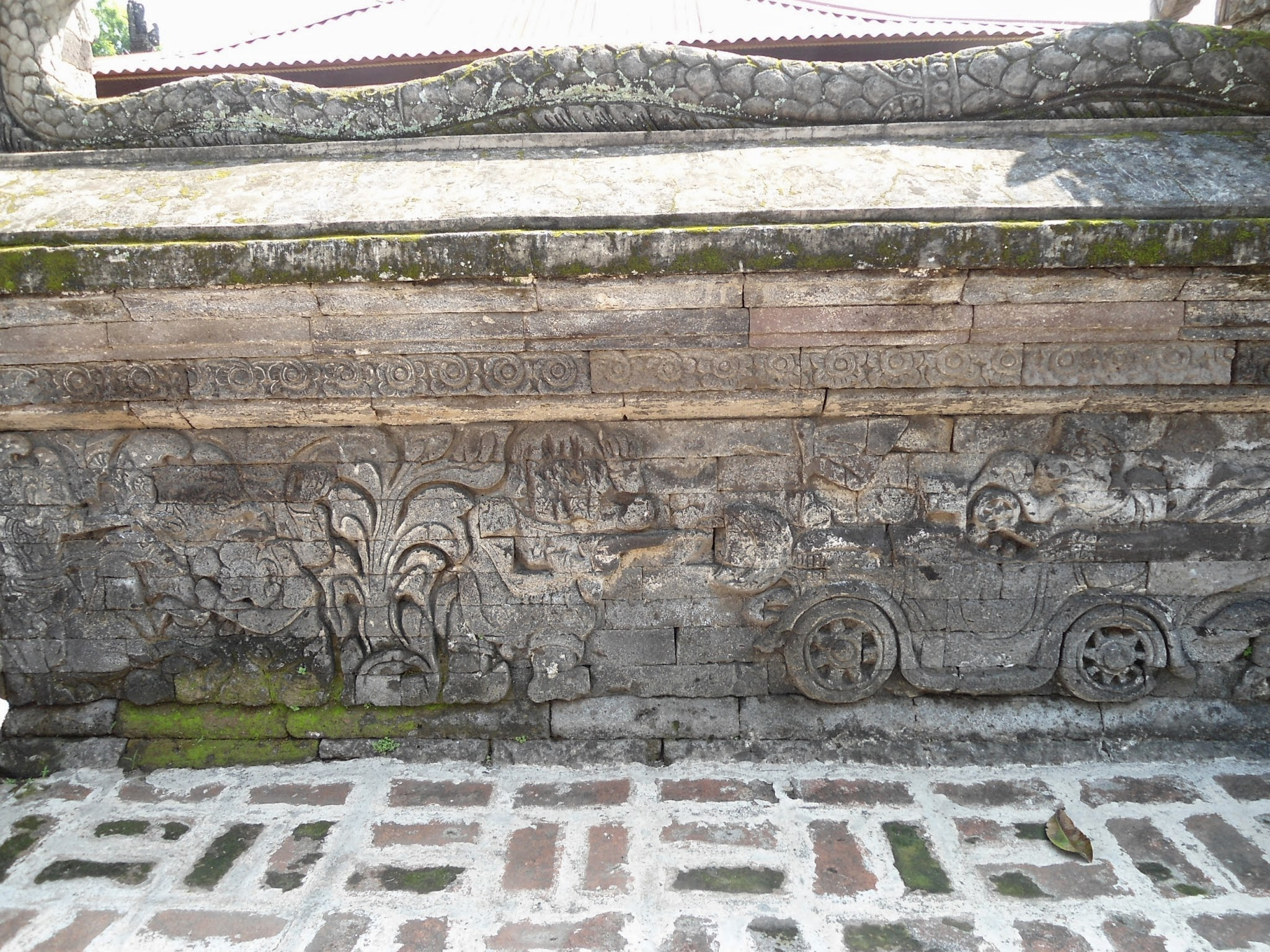
Relief

Typical of northern Balinese temple, Pura Dalem Segara Madhu is carved more ornately than its southern counterpart. Pura Dalem Jagaraga is carved with depictions of foliage, flowers, nagas, and human figures; a type of carvings that can be found in other northern Balinese pura e.g. Pura Beji Sangsit.

Pura Dalem Segara Madhu is one of a few temples in Bali with carvings that depict the western world. Carvings in the perimeter wall of the temple feature unusual 20th-century figures e.g. carving of an airplane falling into the sea, carving of a ship attacked by a sea monster, and carving of an early 20th-century automobile. The carvings depicting the western world can also be found in other northern Balinese pura e.g. Pura Meduwe Karang and Pura Beji Sangsit, indicating contact with the western world in northern Bali. The Dutch colonial government entered Bali through the north. This entry is followed by several conflicts between the Dutch colonial government and the Balinese kingdom. In the mid-19th-century, the Dutch government conducted a series of campaigns to impose its colonial rule on the kingdom of Bali. The last campaign occurred in two times in the early 20th-century; it caused the death of 1000 Balinese civilians and the erasement of a kingdom. The massacre shocked the West where the disproportion between the offense and the harshness of the punitive actions was pointed out. Image of the Netherlands as a benevolent and responsible colonial power was seriously affected as a consequence. The Netherlands, also under criticism for their policies in Java, Sumatra and the eastern island, decided to make amends, and announced the establishment of an "Ethical policy". As a consequence, the Dutch started to learn about and protect Balinese culture and endeavored to preserve it in addition to their initial modernization role. Efforts were made at preserving Bali culture and at making it a "living museum" of classical culture. In 1914, Bali was opened to tourism.

== Temple compound ==
Pura Dalem Segara Madhu is a pura dalem, a type of pura dedicated to Shiva, the Hindu God of death and destruction. Pura dalem is associated with death rituals, and so decorated with sculptures of monstrous nature e.g. the statue of Batari Durga and carving of the demon Rangda.

Pura Dalem Segara Madhu is divided into three areas: the outer sanctum of the temple (jaba pisan or nistaning mandala), the middle sanctum (jaba tengah or madya mandala), and the inner main sanctum (jero or utamaning mandala).

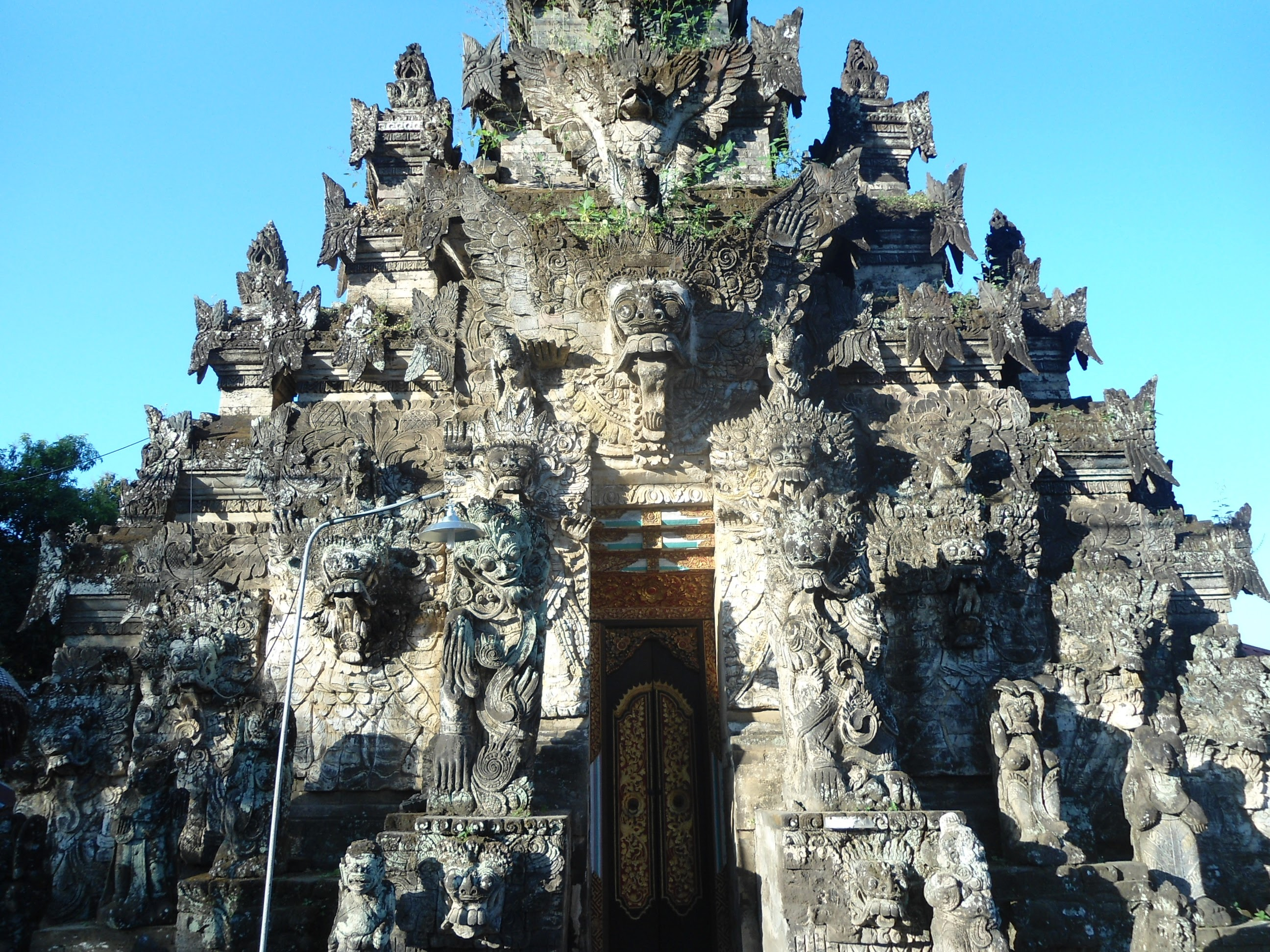
Paduraksa

The outer sanctum or jaba pisan is located right beside the main street of the village, basically, it is the street itself. Access to the middle sanctum is provided by a paduraksa gate carved with intricately in northern Balinese style. The paduraksa features monstrous Bhoma head on top of the portal. Beyond the paduraksa gate is the middle sanctum or jaba tengah. The middle sanctum is where several Balinese pavilions (bale) i.e. bale jeroan ("food pavilion") used to prepare cooking for offering and bale gong ("gong pavilion") to keep and perform the gamelan orchestra are situated.

The innermost sanctum or jero is the most sacred courtyard of the temple. The area contains several shrines dedicated to the deities, e.g., bale pegat, bale pelig, gedong dalem, padmasana, gedong prajapati (the main shrine of Prajapati or Durga), sapta petala, and bale piasan.

== See also ==
- Balinese temple

== Cited works ==
- Auger, Timothy, ed. (2001). Bali & Lombok. Eyewitness Travel Guides. London: Dorling Kindersley. ISBN 0751368709.
- Barski, Albert Beaucort Andy; Barski, Bruce Carpenter (2007). Bali and Lombok. Dorling Kindersley, London. ISBN 9780756628789.
- Stuart-Fox, David (1999). Fox, James J. (ed.). Religion and Ritual: Balinese Hindu Temples. Indonesian Heritage. Singapore: Archipelago Press. ISBN 9813018585.
- Hitchcock, Michael; Nyoman Darma Putra (2007). Tourism, development and terrorism in Bali. ISBN 0-7546-4866-4.
- I Putu Suyatra (November 26, 2017). "Belum Pernah Lihat, tapi Bisa Bikin Relief Mobil dan Pesawat". Bali Express. PT Jawa Pos Group Multimedia. Archived from the original on November 26, 2017.
- Ketut Gobyah (2017). "Pura Lempuyang Luhur". Babad Bali. Yayasan Bali Galang. Archived from the original on November 26, 2017.
