= Ceto Temple =

Hindu temple in Java, Indonesia

Coordinates: 7°35′44″S 111°9′29″E

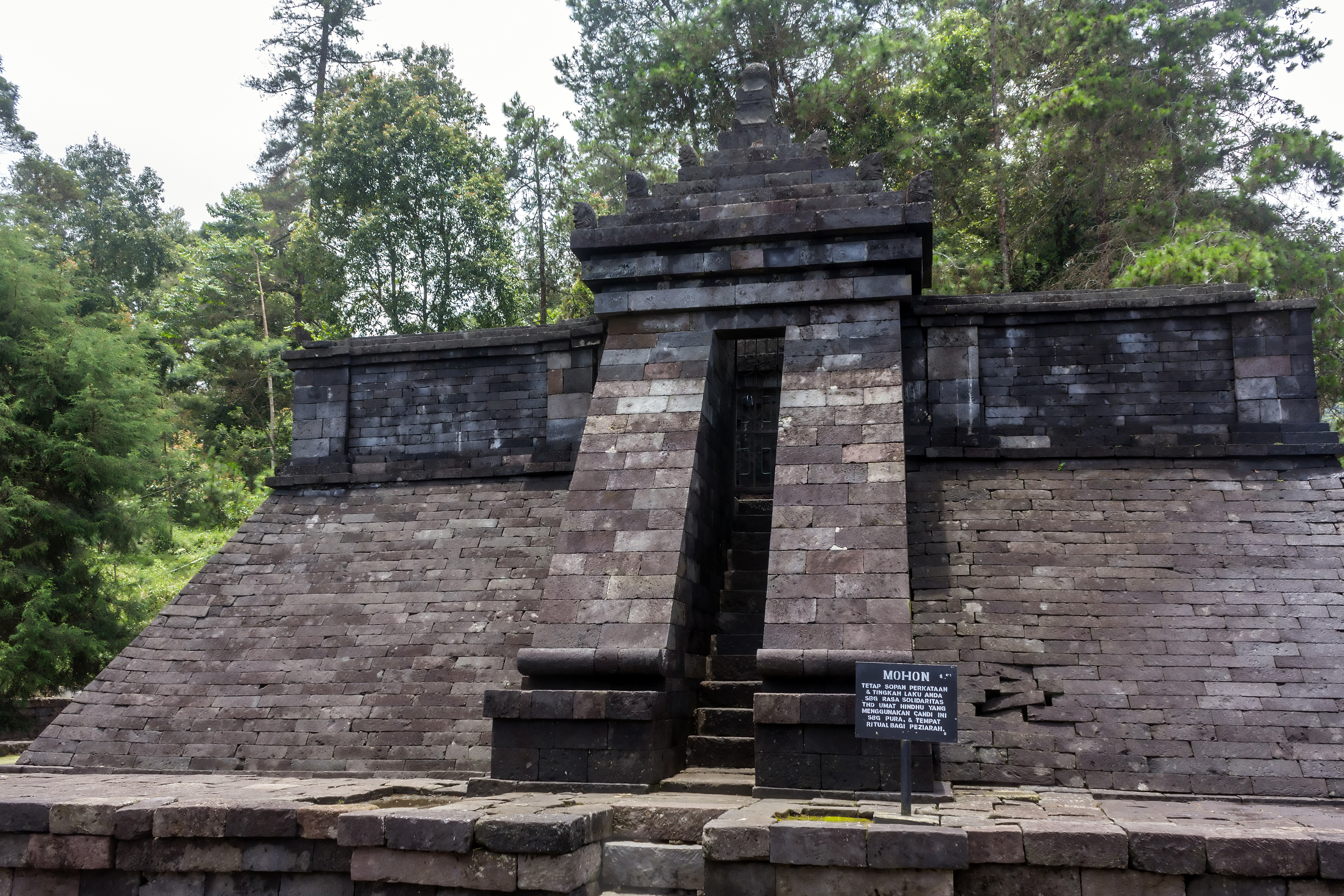
The main temple of Candi Ceto

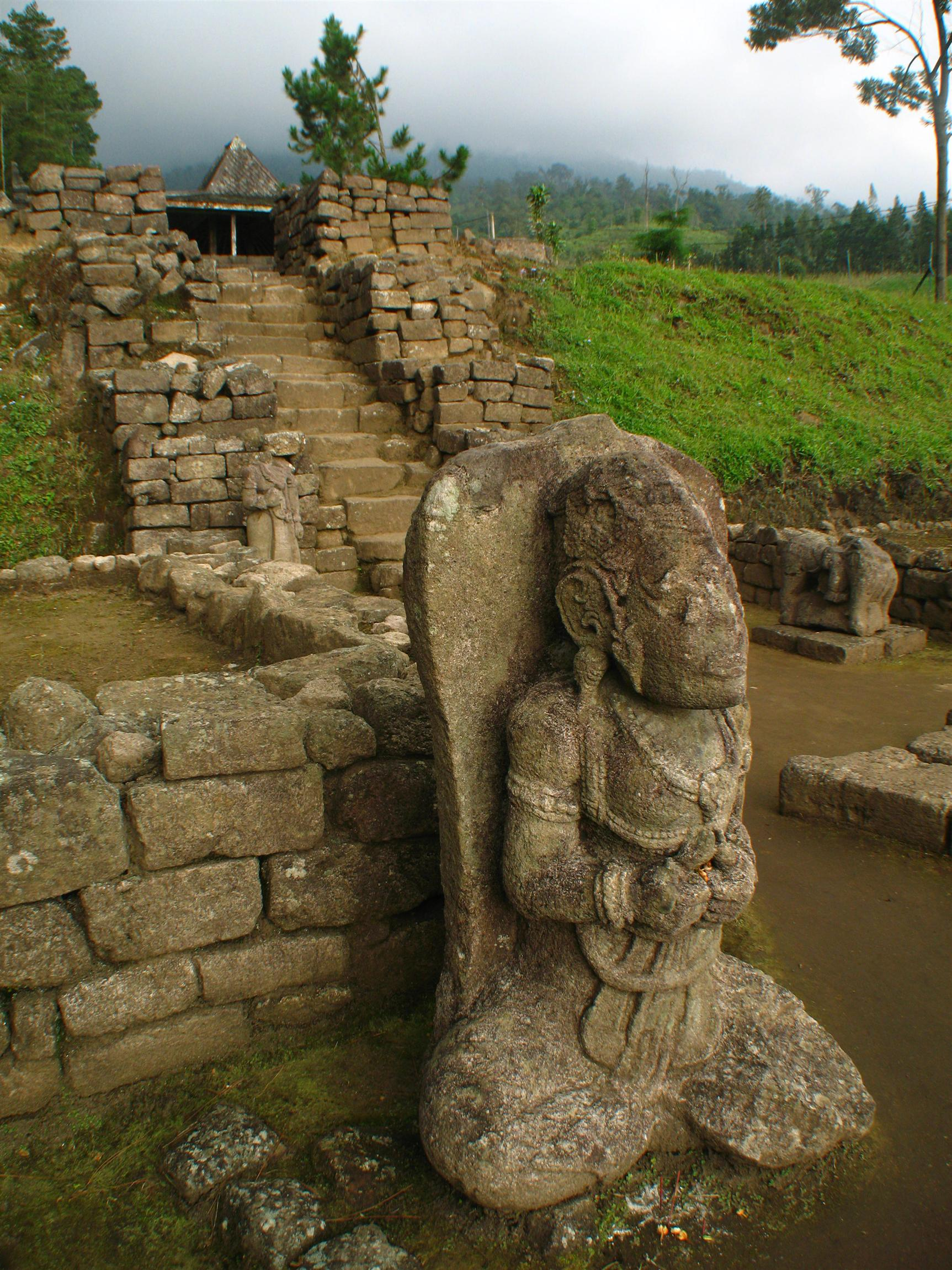
A statue at the main courtyard of Candi Ceto

The Ceto (Indonesian: Candi Ceto) is a fifteenth-century Javanese-Hindu temple that is located on the western slope of Mount Lawu (elev. 1495 m above sea level) on the border between Central and East Java provinces.

Cetho is one of several temples built on the northwest slopes of Mount Lawu in the fifteenth century. By this time, Javanese religion and art had diverged from Indian precepts that had been so influential on temple styles during the 8th-10th century. This area was the last significant area of temple building in Java before the island's courts were converted to Islam in the 16th century. The temples' distinctiveness and the lack of records of Javanese ceremonies and beliefs of the era make it difficult for historians to interpret the significance of these antiquities.

It is close to Sukuh temple.

== See also ==
In Java

- Gunung Padang Megalithic Site
- Candi Kethek, 11th-16th century similar smaller site in Central Java.
- Candi of Indonesia
- Prambanan Temple, 6th-9th century UNESCO heritage Hindu temple in Central Java.
- Sunda Kingdom, 7th-16th century Indianised Hindu kingdom in Western and Central Java.
- Taruma Kingdom, 2nd-6th century Indianised Hindu kingdom of Western Java.

In Indonesia

- Greater India
- Indianisation
- History of Indian influence on Southeast Asia
- Hinduism in Indonesia
- Buddhism in Indonesia

Other related

- List of places with columnar jointed volcanics
