= Mount Lawu =

Massive compound stratovolcano on the island of Java, Indonesia

- Gunung Lawu
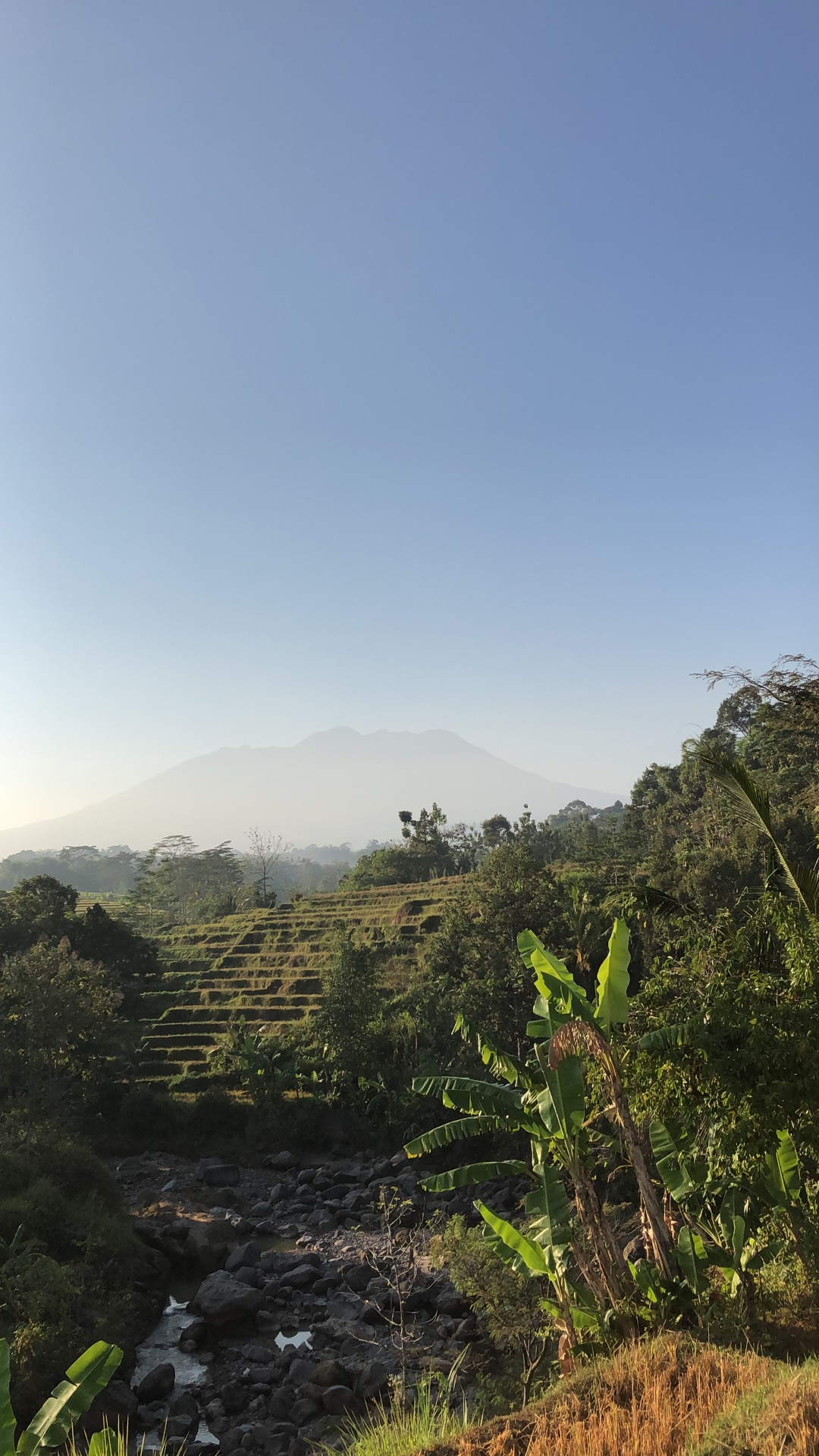
- Lawu in 2018

Highest point
- Elevation: 3,265 m (10,712 ft)
- Prominence: 3,118 m (10,230 ft); Ranked 76th
- Listing: Ultra; Ribu
- Coordinates: 07°37′30″S 111°11′30″E

Geography
- Location within Indonesia Location within Java
- Location: Java, Indonesia

Geology
- Mountain type: Stratovolcano
- Last eruption: 28 November 1885

The Lawu (Javanese: ꦭꦮꦸ), or Mount Lawu (Javanese: ꦒꦸꦤꦸꦁꦭꦮꦸ, romanized: Gunung Lawu) is a massive compound stratovolcano straddling the border between East Java and Central Java, Indonesia. The north side is deeply eroded and the eastern side contains parasitic crater lakes and parasitic cones. A fumarolic area is located on the south flank at 2,550 m. The only reported activity of Lawu took place in 1885 when rumblings and light volcanic ash falls were reported. The recent study provided insights into geothermal heat flow suggesting that Mt. Lawu is still active today.

== Religious significance ==
Mount Lawu is the home of the God Parwatarajadewa (also called Hyang Girinatha in the manuscript Serat Centhini). The New Javanese manuscript Serat Manikmaya states that Mount Lawu is part of the eighteen sacred mountains of Central Java, and scholars agree that it had great religious significance to the Hindus of Java.

Poerbatjaraka stated that the original name of Lawu is Katong, which means God. The name Katong is likely associated with the ruins of Mount Meru, the sacred five-peaked mountain and center of the universe. This association makes it likely that it is a seat of God, for which it is named. The last mention of this name was in the reign of Bhre Kertabhumi (1474-1478), and the first mention of Mount Lawu was in the Bhujangga Manik in the early 16th century, which indicates the name change took place between the 15th and 16th centuries, coinciding with the Islamic invasion.

The nature of Parwatarajadewa can be interpreted as the personified mountain God, and not one of the more dominant Gods of the time, such as the God Shiva, but was widely worshiped and considered a "National God". One of the earliest account of the worship of Parwatarajadewa is in the kakawin Arjunawiwaha:

"Amwit narendrātmaja ring tapowana
Mangañjali (rv) agra ning Indraparwata
Tan wismṛtі sangkan ingkang hayun ḍatang
Swābhawa sang sajana rakwa mangkan"

"Sang Rajaputra (Arjuna) took leave the forest of the hermitage, Worship the peak of Mount Indra
Never forget the origin of the coming goodness, Such is supposedly wise human nature"

Inscriptions of the Sukuh temple carved on the statue of the God Nandi also prove the religious significance of this mountain:

"Peling duk kala
Rakayaman du
Kanungkul mara
marṇa pawitra sa
ka kalanya goḥ
wiku hanaut buntut 1397"

"Warning, when going to prostrate at the top of the mountain, first come in sacred bathing.
Saka year of goḥ wiku hanaut buntut"

These inscriptions prove that Parwatarajadewa was a God of great significance for the Javanese and that the mountain was home to a variety of Rsis, ascetics, and was likely a refuge for Hindus completing the life stage called "Wanaprastha and Sanyasin", in which one would resign themselves to a lonely forest in search of Sanyasin or bhiksuka, a stage of life characterized by self-perfection. It is through the ruwatan ceremony that Rsis and ascetics released themselves from sin and the bodily bond.

=== Archaeology ===
Mount Lawu is home to many historic and prehistoric religious structures. One archeological site is the Site of Watu Kandang Ngasinan, and evidence of monolithic structures dotting the landscape, often in the form of simple rocks three meters in height and two in width jutting into the sky, can be found. Structures dating back to the Hindu era of Java such as the Candi Ceto, Candi Sukuh, Kethek Temple, Buntar Temple, and Planggatan Temple. A Durgamahisasuramardhini state was recovered at the Buntar Temple.

Site Name	Period	Information
Watu Kandang	Prehistoric	Possibly as a burial place
Situs Sawit	Megalithic Tradition	Worship of the ancestors
Situs Selembu	Classic period	Possibly from Ancient Mataram Era
Rumah Arca	Classic period	As a storage place of archaeological objects found in Karanganyar District (museum)
Situs Menggung	Classic period	The element of megalithic tradition is quite visible
Buntar Temple	Classic period	Unknown date
Cetho Temple	Classic period	15th century, 13 terraces
Kethek Temple	Classic period	Possibly built in the 15th century, 4 terraces
Sukuh Temple	Classic period	15th century, 3 terraces
Planggatan Temple	Classic period	15th century, 3 terraces
East Argo Dumilah	Classic period	5 terraces
North Argo Dumilah	Megalithic Tradition	5 terraces
West Argo Dumilah	Megalithic Tradition	3 terraces
West Argo Dalem	Megalithic Tradition	5 terraces
Northwest Argo Dalem	Megalithic Tradition	5 terraces
South Argo Dalem	Megalithic Tradition	2 terraces
East Argo Dalem	Megalithic Tradition	7 terraces
Sendang Drajat	Megalithic Tradition	5 terraces
Pasar Dieng	Megalithic Tradition	7 terraces
Cemoro Bulus	Classic Period	Same period with Sukuh Temple, Planggatan, and Cetho

== Cultural features ==
The western slopes of Lawu have a number of graveyards - including Astana Giribangun and Mangkunegaran.

== See also ==
- Bengawan Solo
- List of volcanoes in Indonesia
- List of ultras of the Malay Archipelago
- Argo Lawu
