= Indonesian 100-rupiah coin =

Indonesian coin

One hundred rupiah
- Indonesia
- Value: Rp 100
- Mass: 1.79 g
- Diameter: 23 mm
- Thickness: 2 mm
- Edge: Smooth
- Composition: Cupronickel (1973-1990); Aluminium-bronze (1991-1998); Aluminium (1999-present)
- Years of minting: 1973-present

Obverse
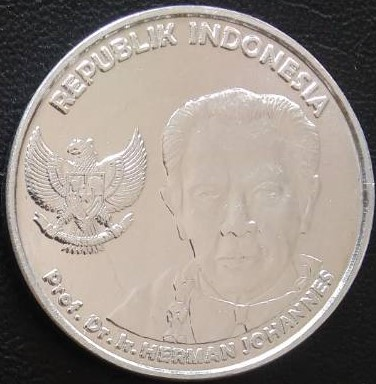
- Designer: Bank of Indonesia
- Design date: 2016

Reverse
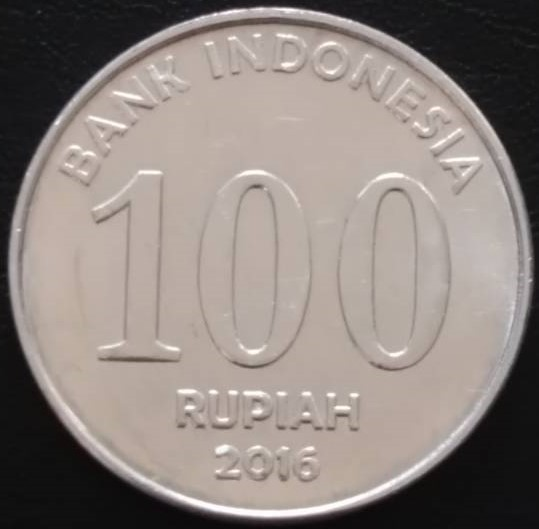
- Designer: Bank of Indonesia
- Design date: 2016

The Indonesian one hundred rupiah coin (Rp100) is a denomination of the Indonesian rupiah. First introduced in 1973 in cupronickel, it has been revised four times throughout its history, changing materials in 1991 (to aluminium-bronze) and 1999 (to aluminium). As of 2022, it is the second-lowest valued rupiah coin that is legal tender after the Rp50 coin.

== First series (1973) ==
The 100 rupiah coin was first introduced in 1973 as a cupronickel coin weighing 9.72 g (0.343 oz). It had a diameter of 28.5 millimetres (1.12 in) and was 1.77 mm (0.070 in) thick. Its obverse featured the denomination ("100") in its centre with the lettering "BANK INDONESIA," two stars, and the mint year (1973). Meanwhile, its reverse depicts a rumah gadang, a traditional house from West Sumatra, as well as the lettering "Rp 100" on top of it. Its edge was smooth and featured the lettering "BANK INDONESIA". 252,868,000 coins were minted bearing this date. These coins were demonetised on 25 June 2002, and was redeemable in general banks until 24 June 2007, and in Bank Indonesia offices up to 24 June 2012.

== Second series (1978) ==
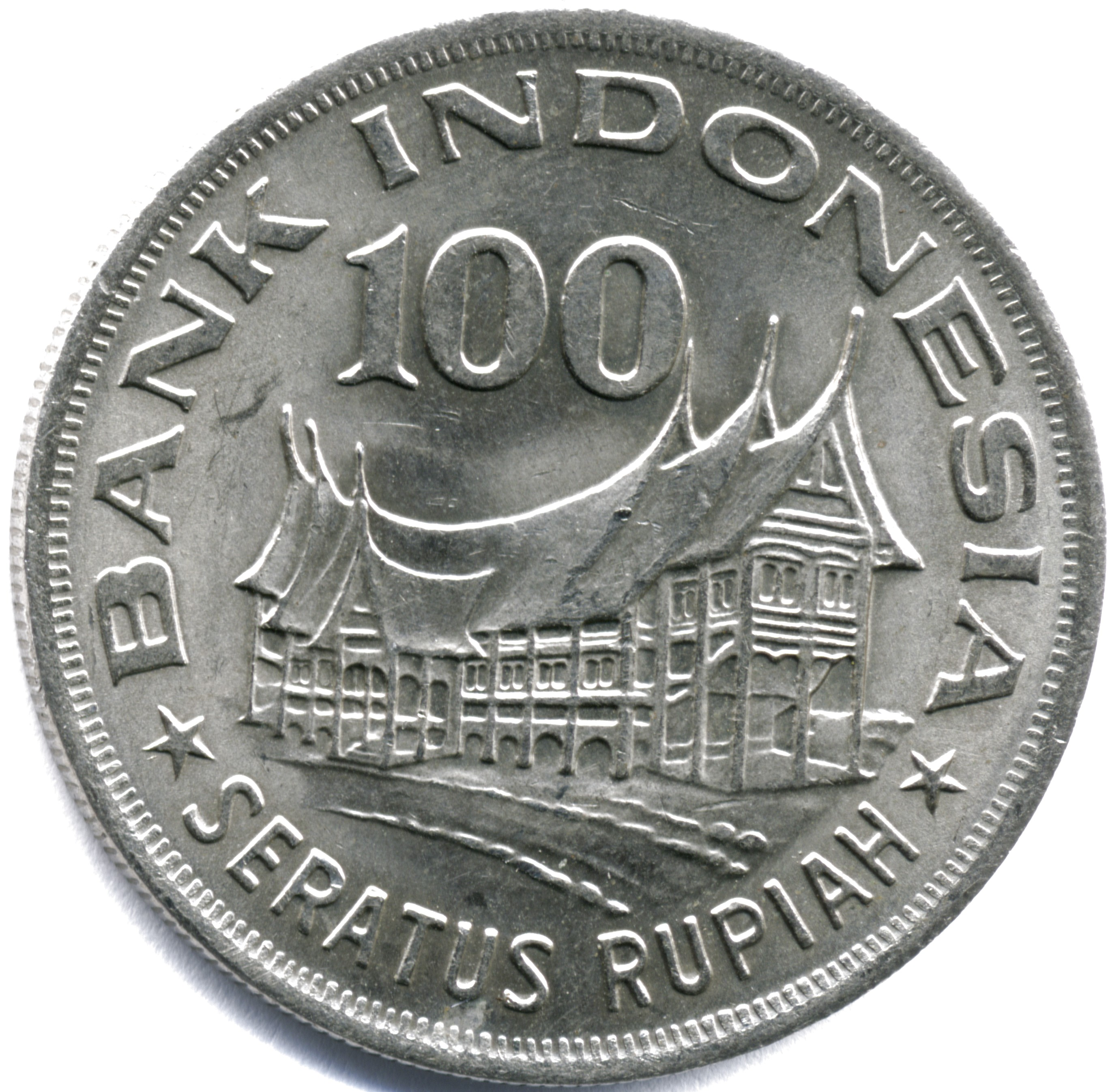
Obverse of the 1978 coin

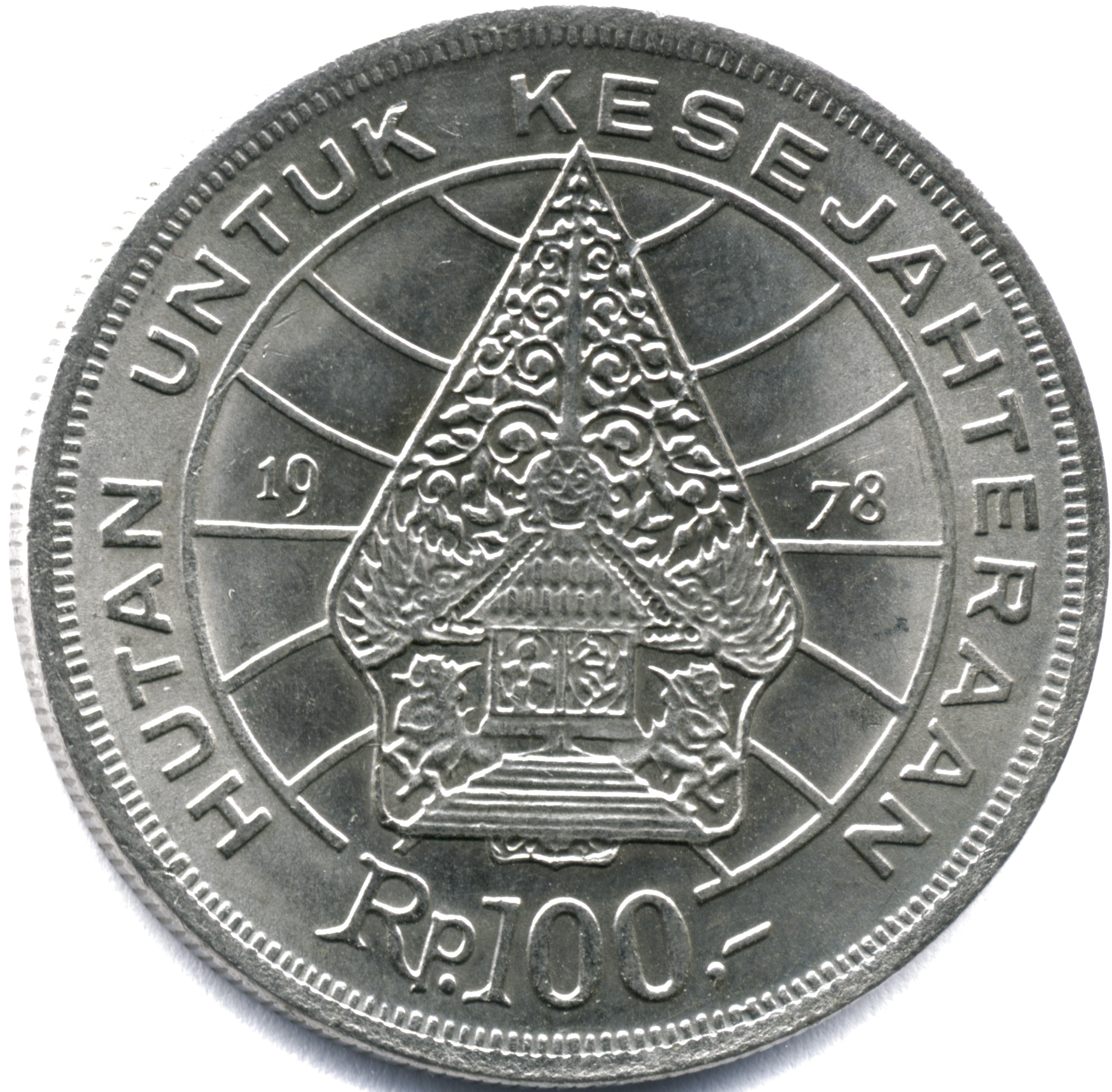
Reverse of the 1978 coin

In 1978, this coin was updated, now as a FAO circulating commemorative coin. The rumah gadang was moved to the coin's obverse, while its reverse now features a depiction of a gunungan, an element in Javanese wayang, over a depiction of a globe. At the same time, the lettering gets updated, with its obverse now featuring the letterings "BANK INDONESIA" and "SERATUS RUPIAH" while keeping the two stars, and its reverse now featuring the lettering "HUTAN UNTUK KESEJAHTERAAN" (FORESTRY FOR PROSPERITY) and the denomination as well as the mint year (1978). This coin was also made lighter and thinner, as it now weighs 7 g (0.25 oz) (as opposed to the 1973 coin's 9.72 g (0.343 oz)) and was 1.4 mm (0.055 in) thick (instead of the 1973 series' 1.7 mm (0.067 in)); however, its diameter remained the same at 28.5 mm (1.12 in). Furthermore, the "BANK INDONESIA" lettering, once etched to its edge, was removed; with the edge itself being made reeded. 907,773,000 of these coins were minted in total. These coins were taken out of circulation on 25 June 2002, the same date as the 1973 coins, and were redeemable in commercial banks until 24 June 2007, and in Bank Indonesia offices until 24 June 2012.

== Third series (1991-1998) ==
In 1991, this coin was updated for the second time. Now minted in aluminium-bronze, it had a diameter of 22 mm (0.87 in), thickness of 1.6 mm (0.063 in), and a weight of 4.13 g (0.146 oz). It had a smooth edge with no lettering, as opposed to the 1978 design's reeded edge and the 1973 design's carving of "BANK INDONESIA." Its obverse featured the national emblem Garuda Pancasila, the lettering "BANK INDONESIA" (now made smaller and placed on the bottom), and the mint year (1991-1998), while its reverse featured a depiction of karapan sapi, a Madurese bull-racing event, the denomination (Rp 100), and the lettering "Karapan Sapi." These coins were demonetised on 30 November 2006, and was redeemable in commercial banks until 29 November 2011, and in Bank Indonesia offices until 29 November 2016.

Mintage figures of this coin are as follows:

Year	Amount
1991	94,000,000
1992	120,000,000
1993	300,000,000
1994	550,000,000
1995	798,180,000
1996	41,000,000
1997	150,000,000
1998	59,000,000

== Fourth series (1999-2005) ==
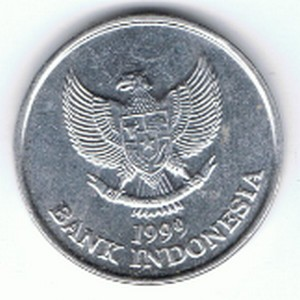
Obverse of the 1999 coin

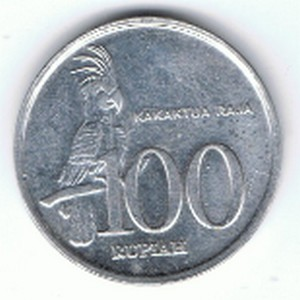
Reverse of the 1999 coin

The coin was updated for the third time in 1999, with its material switched to aluminium. It had a diameter of 23 mm (0.91 in), thickness of 2 mm (0.079 in), weight of 1.79 g (0.063 oz), and a smooth edge. While its obverse remained unchanged as the 1991 series, its reverse now featured a depiction of the palm cockatoo (Probosciger aterrimus) as well as the lettering "KAKAKTUA RAJA" (PALM COCKATOO) to its upper right and denomination (100 RUPIAH) to its lower right.

== Fifth series (2016) ==
As part of the release of the then-new National Heroes series of rupiah coins and banknotes on 19 December 2016, the coin was updated for the fourth time. Its obverse now not only features the national emblem (now moved to the upper left), but also a depiction of Prof. Dr. Ir. Herman Johannes to its right, as well as the letterings "REPUBLIK INDONESIA" on top of both images and "Prof. Dr. Ir. HERMAN JOHANNES" to its bottom. Meanwhile, its reverse now featured a simple depiction of the denomination, the lettering "BANK INDONESIA," and the mint year (2016).

== See also ==
- Indonesian rupiah
- Coins of the rupiah
