= Indonesian 500-rupiah coin =

Indonesian coin

Five hundred rupiah
- Indonesia
- Value: Rp 500
- Mass: 3.1 g
- Diameter: 27.2 mm
- Thickness: 2.35 mm
- Edge: Smooth
- Composition: Aluminium-bronze (1991-2003); Aluminium (2003-present)
- Years of minting: 1991-present

Obverse
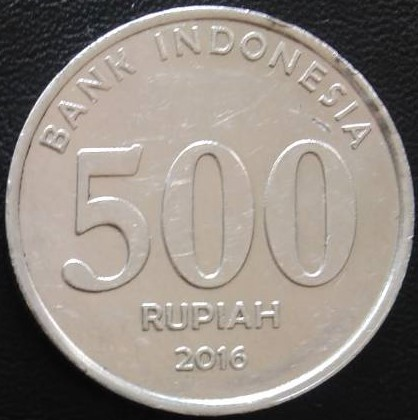
- Designer: Bank of Indonesia
- Design date: 2016

Reverse
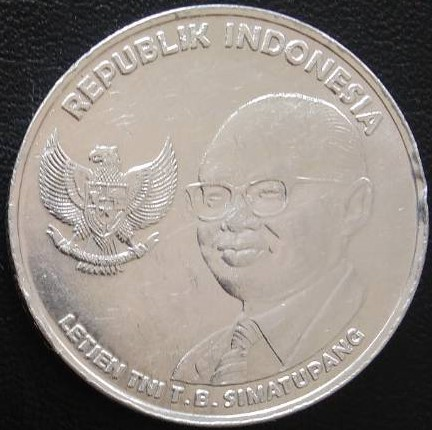
- Designer: Bank of Indonesia
- Design date: 2016

The Indonesian five hundred rupiah coin (Rp500) is a denomination of the Indonesian rupiah. It was introduced in 1991 and has since been revised three times, in 1997, 2003, and 2016. It currently has the second-highest value of all circulating rupiah coins after the Rp1,000 coin. As of December 2023, only aluminium 500 rupiah coins, dated 2003 and 2016, are legal tender.

== First issue (1991-1992) ==
The Rp500 coin was first introduced in 1991 as an aluminium-bronze coin. It weighed 5.3 g (0.19 oz), had a 24 mm (0.94 in) diameter, was 1.75 mm (0.069 in) thick, and had a reeded edge. It had two parts: a reeded outer part that curves around the coin eight times, and an inner part that contains its obverse and reverse images. The obverse featured the national emblem Garuda Pancasila, the lettering "BANK INDONESIA," and the mint year, while the reverse depicted an image of the jasmine flower (Jasminum), the lettering "Bunga Melati" ("jasmine flower") and the denomination ("Rp500"). 71 million of these coins were minted in 1991, and 100 million in 1992. Not much is known about the mintage figures for coins issued between 1993 and 1996.

== Second issue (1997-2003) ==
Still minted in aluminum-bronze, the coin was revised for the first time in 1997. While its obverse stayed the same as the previous series, its reverse now depicted the denomination similar to the 1970s style of a large number and text (in this case a large "500" and the lettering "RUPIAH" below it). The jasmine image was reduced in size and moved to the upper part, while the lettering "BUNGA MELATI" was capitalized and placed below the "RUPIAH" lettering. Coins of this design were minted until 2003 and weighed 5.34 g (0.188 oz), had a diameter of 24 mm (0.94 in), were 1.83 mm (0.072 in) thick, and had a smooth edge.

== Third issue (2003) ==
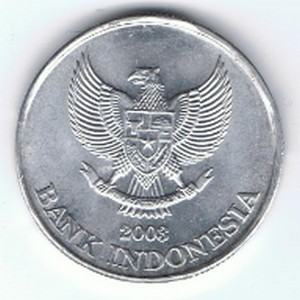
Obverse of 2003 issue

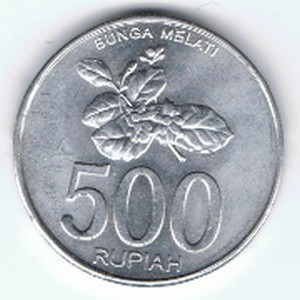
Reverse of 2003 issue

The coin was revised for the second time in 2003 as an aluminum coin with an alternating smooth-and-reeded edge that weighed 3.1 g (0.11 oz), had a diameter of 27.2 mm (1.07 in), and was 2.5 mm (0.098 in) thick. While its obverse still remains the same as the 1992 and 1997 series (featuring the national emblem, mint year ("2003"), and the lettering "BANK INDONESIA," its reverse now featured an enlarged jasmine flower, with the "500" denomination made less dominant (unlike in the 1997 coins) and the lettering "BUNGA MELATI" now moved upwards.

== Fourth issue (2016) ==
The coin was updated for the third time in 2016 as part of the new currency series that Bank Indonesia released on December 19 of that year. Its obverse now features not only the national emblem, but also a portrait of Lieutenant General T. B. Simatupang as well as the lettering "REPUBLIK INDONESIA" on its top and "LETJEN TNI T. B. SIMATUPANG" on its bottom. Meanwhile, the reverse was made similar to the 1997 design, with a dominant "500 RUPIAH" as well as the lettering "BANK INDONESIA" on its upper portion and the mint year ("2016") on its lower side.

== Non-circulating commemorative issue (1970) ==
Alongside the four circulating coins, Bank Indonesia also minted a 999‰ silver coin bearing this denomination in 1970 to commemorate Indonesia's 25th independence anniversary. It weighed 20g, had a 40mm diameter, and had a reeded edge. Its obverse featured the national emblem Garuda Pancasila as well as BI's logo to its left and the mint year ("1970") to its right, with the lettering "1945-1970" above the emblem and "500 RUPIAH" below it. Meanwhile, its reverse featured a depiction of a wayang dancer, as well as two stars to the left and right of the image and the letterings "25 TAHUN KEMERDEKAAN" ("25 YEARS OF INDEPENDENCE") and "REPUBLIK INDONESIA" above and below it. 4,800 of these coins were minted in total.

== Demonetisation of first and second series ==
Both the 1991 and 1997 coins ceased to be legal tender from 1 December 2023; these coins are redeemable in commercial banks and Bank Indonesia offices until 1 December 2033.

== See also ==
- Indonesian rupiah
- Coins of the rupiah
