= Coins of the Indonesian rupiah =

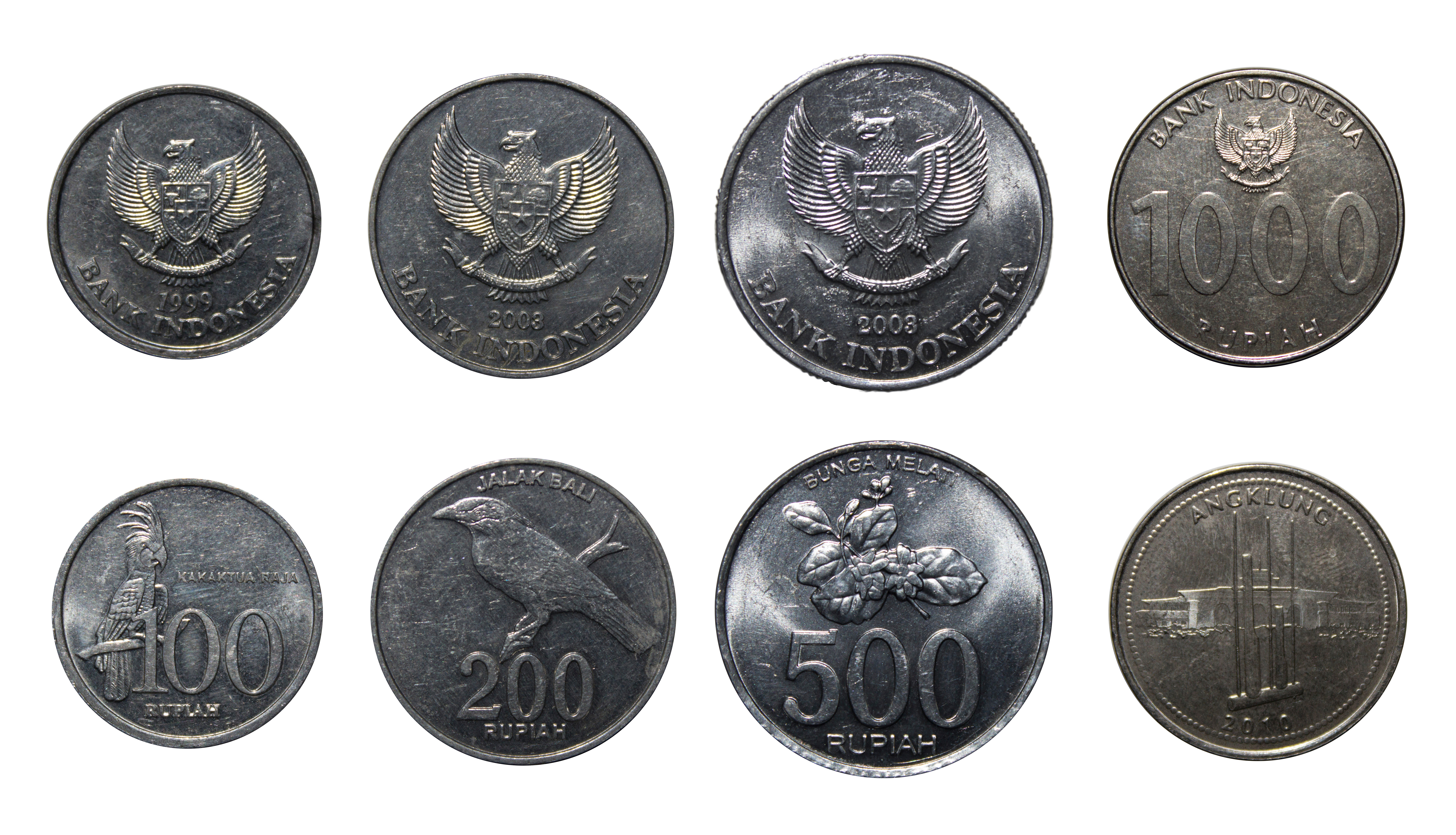
100-, 200-, 500-, and 1000-rupiah coins from 1999, 2003, and 2010 series.

The first coins of the Indonesian rupiah were issued in 1951 and 1952, a year or so after the first Indonesian rupiah banknotes were printed, following the peace treaty with the Netherlands in November 1949. Paper revolutionary currency had been issued by the provisional Indonesian government between 1945 and 1949, as metals were too scarce for the internationally isolated government to use as currency.

Due to high inflation in the late 1950s and early 1960s, no coins were minted after 1961, and that which remained in circulation were effectively worthless.

A devalued 'new rupiah' was issued in an attempt to tame inflation in 1965, with banknotes in denominations all the way from Rp0.01 (1 cent) up to Rp100 - no coins were struck at this time. By 1971, however, the economy, and inflation, under Suharto's New Order was stable, and coinage was once again issued, in denominations of Rp1, Rp5, Rp10, Rp25 and Rp50, with Rp100 coins added two years later. Due to inflation, the current coinage now consists of Rp25, Rp50, Rp100, Rp200, Rp500 and Rp1,000, although older Rp1 coins remain officially legal tender for completeness.

Unlike coinage of the Netherlands Indian gulden (which in higher denominations were made of silver or gold), circulating rupiah coinage has always been formed of base metal.

== Cent (sen) coinage of the rupiah from Old Order (1951–1961) ==
For the first couple of years until sufficient coins had been issued, government cent notes were circulated, of Rp0.10, Rp0.25 and Rp0.50 denominations. No lower denominations were printed, but the old bronze Netherlands Indies gulden coins of ½, 1 and 2½ cents remained as legal tender (higher denominations, starting from 1/20 gulden (5 cents), had been silver, with greater intrinsic metal value).

Coinage, issued in 1951 and 1952, and from then until 1961, replaced the notes as sufficient coinage entered circulation. Under Indonesian law originally enacted by the Dutch, the government was responsible for the issue of money with values below Rp5 (in Dutch times gulden), and hence all coins bore the name of Indonesia, rather than the central bank.

The denominations were Rp0.01, Rp0.05, Rp0.10, Rp0.25 and Rp0.50. The Rp0.01 and Rp0.05 coins had centre holes, similar to the old copper coins of the Dutch, while the other coins were solid. All were aluminium except the Rp0.50, which was cupronickel. Rp0.01 coins were effectively worthless, and only a token number of 100,000 were minted, all dated 1952. Rp0.05 coins were more useful and were also minted dated 1954, as were the Rp0.10 coins.

From 1954, Indonesia began to stop using the Jawi script, which had been a feature of the coins of the Netherlands Indies as well as of past Islamic sultanates in the archipelago. The Rp0.50 coin was the first to be changed, with the Arabic text simply removed from the coin for its 1954-dated minting.

The Rp0.25 coin was the next to have the Arabic removed, with "INDONESIA" replacing its Jawi equivalent for the second minting of the coin, dated 1955 (the Rp0.50 coin was also minted that year).

Inflation meant that the smallest denomination to be minted after 1954 was the Rp0.10, which likewise had Arabic removed from its reverse for its third minting, 1957; Rp0.25 and Rp0.50 coins were also minted in 1957.

After 1957, the cupronickel Rp0.50 coin was debased to aluminium, the same metal as the lower denomination coins (which were never minted again). As a result of this, the Rp0.50 coin, previously the heaviest, but second-smallest coin - slightly larger than the Rp0.01 coin, was now the largest coin in circulation (albeit lighter than its predecessor).

First coins of the Indonesian rupiah
| Image | | Technical Data | | | | Description | | Mintage | Obverse | Reverse |
| Obverse | Reverse | Value | Date | Composition | Diameter | Mass | Edge | Mintage | Obverse | Reverse |
| | | 1 sen | 1952 | Aluminium | 18 mm | 0.75g | Smooth | 0.1 million | Rice stalk around centre hole, "INDONESIA 1952", "1 SEN", Mintmark of Utrecht (bunch of grapes) and its then Mintmaster (fish) | "Indonesia 1 sen" in Jawi script around centre hole |
| | | 5 sen | 1951, 1954 | Aluminium | 22 mm | 1.3g | Smooth | | Rice stalk around centre hole, "INDONESIA 1951/1954", "5 SEN"; Mint mark and Mint Master's mark on 1951 coin (not on 1954) | "Indonesia 5 sen" in Jawi script around centre hole |
| | | 10 sen | 1951, 1954, 1957 | Aluminium | 23.5 mm | 1.72g | Reeded | 50m (1954), 50.2m (1957) | Central scalloped circle with "10 SEN", circumscribed by "INDONESIA 1951/1954/1957", Mint and Master's mark on 1951 coin only | Garuda Pancasila with Indonesia in Jawi (in Latin script on 1957) |
| | | 25 sen | 1952, 1955, 1957 | Aluminium | 27.7 mm | 2.2g | Reeded | 200m (1952), 25.8m (1955), 99.8m (1957) | Central scalloped circle with "25 SEN", circumscribed by "INDONESIA 1952/1955/1957", Mint and Master's mark on 1952 coin only | Garuda Pancasila with Indonesia in Jawi (in Latin script on 1955 and 1957) |
| | | 50 sen | 1952, 1954, 1955, 1957 | Copper-nickel | 20.0 mm | 3.24g | Reeded | 100m (1952), 1.3m (1954), 15m (1955), 26.3m (1957) | Central scalloped circle with "50 SEN", circumscribed by "INDONESIA 1952/1954/1955/1957", Mint and Master's mark on 1952 coin only | Diponegoro "DIPA NEGARA" (also in Jawi script on 1952 coin only); text is smaller on 1952 and 1955 coins |
| | | 50 sen | 1958, 1959, 1961 | Aluminium | 29 mm | 3.02g | Reeded | 33.7m (1958), 100.0m(1959), 150m (1961) | Large "50" over "SEN" in a large circle, circumscribed by "REPUBLIK INDONESIA 1958/1959/1961" | Garuda Pancasila with text "INDONESIA" |

=== Diponegoro gold piece ===
In 1952, 36,000 gold pieces of 22 karats were struck in Utrecht featuring on the reverse the design of the circulating 50 sen coin of that year. Unlike the regular issue, the gold piece has a larger diameter and replaces the obverse of the face value with the Garuda Pancasila emblem and the inscription “INDONESIA – BERKERDJA MENABUNG MEMBANGUN” (“Working – Saving – Building”). Many sources describe the piece as carrying a face value of 25 rupiah; however, Bank Indonesia has stated on the holder of recent releases of specimens to be a medal, not mentioning about a face value.

=== One Indonesian ringgit equals Rp2½ ===
Indonesians have an old proverb: seringgit si dua kupang, setali si tiga uang (1 ringgit is 2 kupang, 1 tali is 3 uang). The proverb refers to the Indonesian names of coins and currency units before 17 August 1945. As Widarto claims keping also cepeng, hepeng = ¼ cents, peser = 1/200 rupiah = ½ cents, cent = 1/100 rupiah, pincang = 1½ cents but no coin was ever issued in this value, gobang = 1/40 rupiah = 2 1/2 cents, kelip = 1/20 rupiah = 5 cents, ketip also picis, ketit = 1/10 rupiah = 10 cents, tali = 1/4 rupiah = 25 cents = 3 uang which means money, ukan also ukon = 1/2 rupiah = 50 cents, rupiah was a value equal to the 1 guilder of Hindia-Belanda, the Netherlands Indies, kupang = 1/2 ringgit = 1 1/4 rupiah, benggol = seringgit = 1 ringgit = 2 1/2 rupiah = 2 1/2 Netherlands Indies guilder. The uang although it means money in Indonesian was merely a value of 1/3 tali = 8 1/3 cents but no coin was ever issued in this value. The Kupang gave its name to an Indonesian city in southwest of Timor. The coin was made of gold, circulated in Aceh, Sulawesi and Malayan states in some forms, for centuries.

In 1963 Indonesia Issued a coin of 2 1/2 rupiah depicting Sukarno in two forms, one of the coins was intended for West Irian, the other was intended for entire Indonesia, but both coins were minted in very limited quantities. Their values according to Krause catalogue are US$290 for the first coin and US$100 for the Irian coin. While NGC online catalogue evaluate one of the coins as worth US$290. West Irian coin is evaluated as US$100, and never placed into circulation, maybe because of hyperinflation that ruled Indonesian economy in Sukarno era, especially during the years 1959 to 1965.

== Indonesian coinage of the rupiah from New Order (1971-1997) ==
=== 1971–1974: reintroduction of coins to Indonesia ===
With the raging inflation of the 1960s very much under control at this point, coin issuing resumed after a 10-year hiatus, and coins were issued on 1 January 1971, of denominations Rp1, Rp2 and Rp5, all in aluminium. Rp10, Rp25, and Rp50 cupronickel coins were added on 5 April 1971. The coins featured the wording "Bank Indonesia", a large "1" with "rupiah" underneath, and the year "1970" (Rp1, Rp2, and Rp5 coins) or "1971" and "1974" (Rp10 Rp25, Rp50 coins) on its obverse. The 1974 10 rupiah coin depicts a piggy bank for storing money, placed next to rice and cotton, and surrounded by the words "MENABUNG UNTUK MENUNJANG PEMBANGUNAN." This 1974 10 rupiah coin is gold in color.

The reverse of the coins showed "Rp 1", "Rp 5", "The number 10 Rupiah is written in the middle and surrounded by the words Bank Indonesia and closed by 2 small stars with the words 1974 written on them. This coin is gold in color", "Rp 25", "Rp 50", plus various designs: white-browed fantail (1rp), rice and cotton stalk (2rp), black drongo bird (5rp), rice and cotton stalk with Indonesian wording "TINGKATKAN PRODUKSI SANDANG PANGAN" ("increase the product of clothing and food") (10rp), Victoria crowned pigeon (25rp), and greater bird of paradise (50rp). The final mintages of these coins were: 136 million (1 rupiah), 139 million (2 rupiah), 448 million (5 rupiah), 286 million (10 rupiah), 1.22 billion (25 rupiah) and 1 billion (50 rupiah).

The 10 rupiah coin was issued as part of the UN Food and Agriculture Organization coins and medals program, an international issue by ultimately 114 countries. A variety of coin sets were sold to coin collectors to raise money for the UN's food program. In addition to the sale to collectors, the vast majority of the 10 rupiah coins were used within Indonesia - in addition to some rarer coins (none of which were issued in Indonesia) the FAO wanted low denomination circulating coinage that called for increasing food production.

At the time the exchange rate was 378 rupiah to the US$, so the smallest coin was worth approximately 1/4 of a US cent (note however that the 1 and 2 rupiah coins were never reissued, and hence the 5 rupiah coin was shortly to become the smallest denomination).

The coin selection was extended with a '1973'-dated cupro-nickel 100 rupiah coin of large size showing a Minangkabau tribal house, which was issued on 2 January 1974, at which time the coin was worth about US$0.24. A total of 913 million of these coins were minted.

As a result of the successful re-establishment of coinage in Indonesia, notes below 100 rupiah were withdrawn in Indonesia permanently from 1 September 1975 (at which point the exchange rate was fixed at 415 rupiah to the dollar, hence the largest denomination banknote to be withdrawn, the 50 rupiah note, was worth around US$0.10).

1971 and 1974 Indonesian coins:

50 Indonesian rupiah (1971).
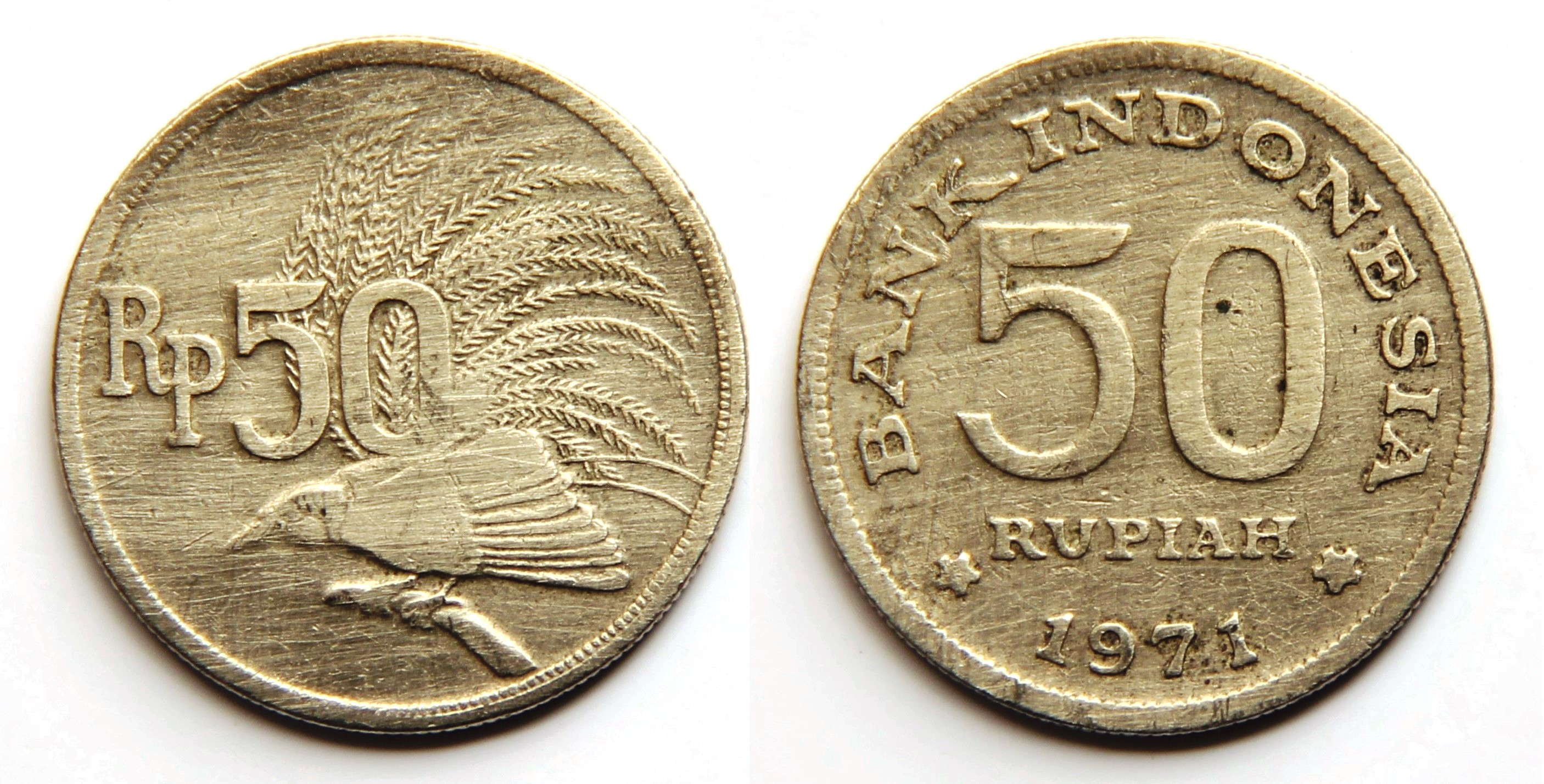
First side of the image: Obverse: Greater bird-of-paradise on a branch and face value.
Second side of the image: Reverse: Face value surrounded by country and year.
Total 1,035,435,000 coins minted in 1971. Coin Demonetised on 25 June 2002.
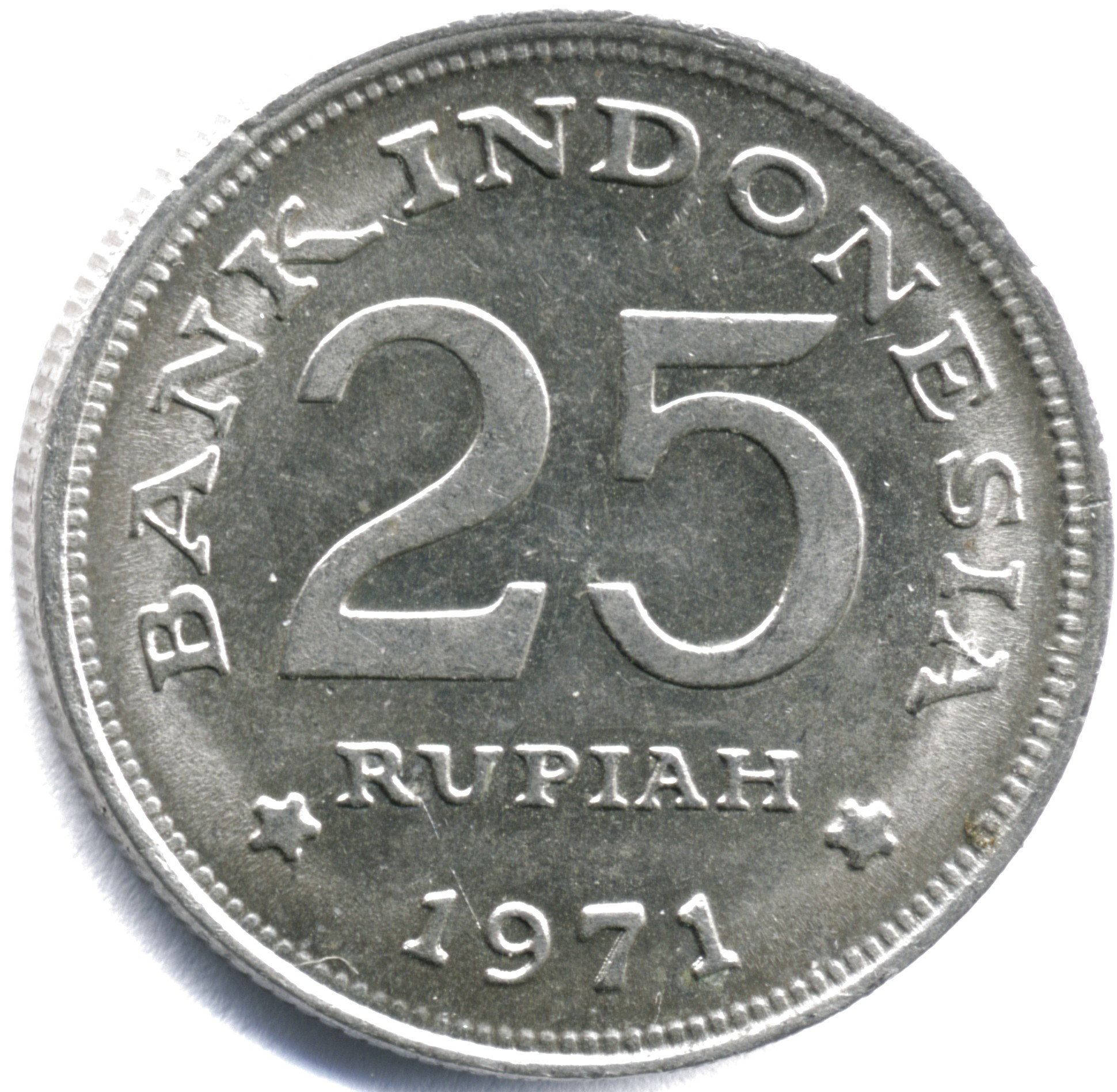
25 rupiah obverse

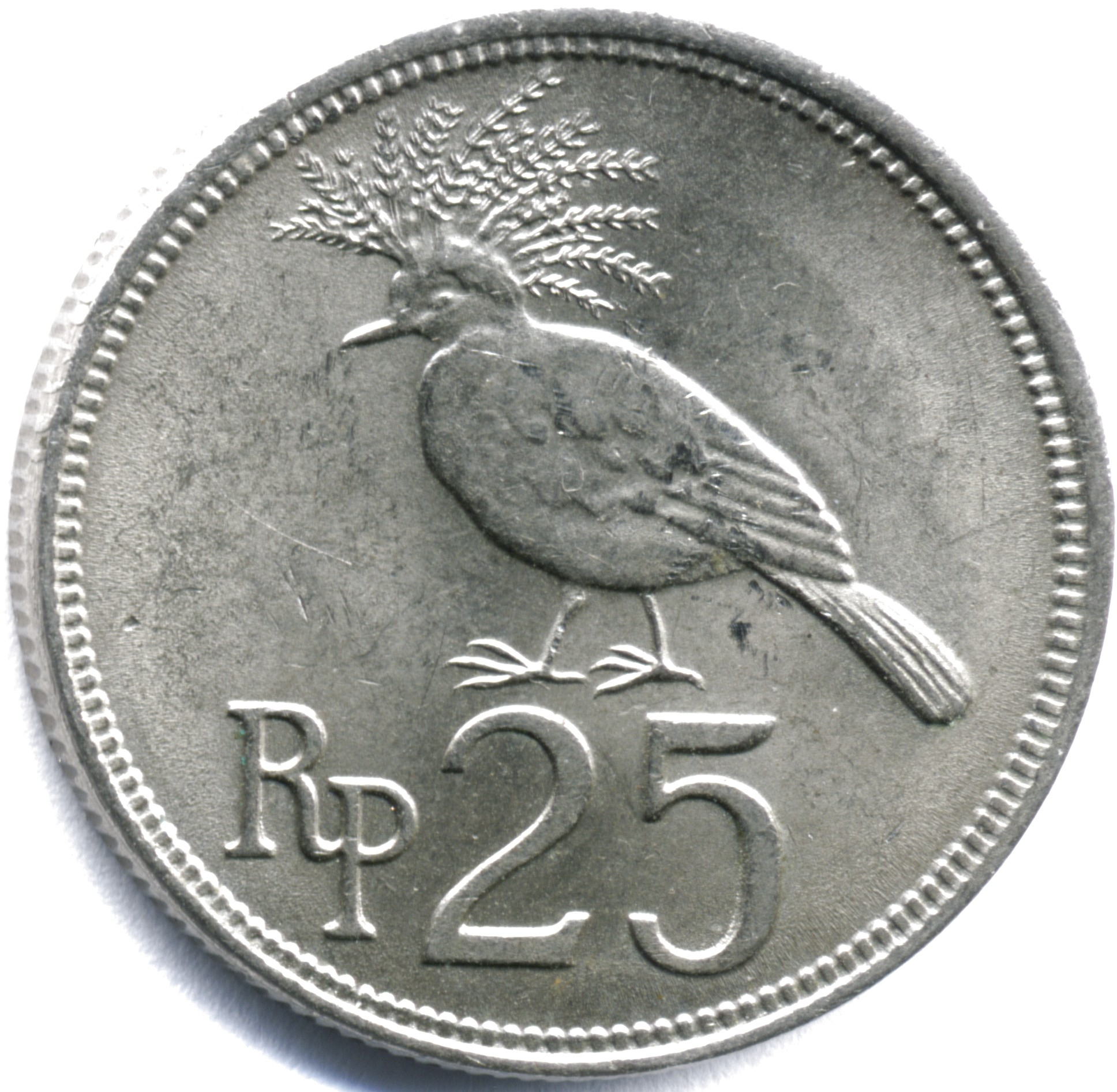
25 rupiah reverse

=== 1974: coin redesigns ===
The 5 rupiah aluminium coin was revised dated 1974, the obverse changing only the date, but the reverse depicting the logo of KB ('Keluarga Berencana', aka family planning', a movement first established by the Indonesian government in 1970), i.e. a 2-parent, 2-child family with rice and cotton stalk and letters KB, with the text 'KELUARGA BERENCANA' ('family planning') 'MENUJU KESEJAHTERAAN RAKYAT' ('for the welfare of the people'). 448 million were minted.

The 10 rupiah was enlarged substantially dated 1974, with the composition changed to brass-clad steel, with the obverse unchanged, and the reverse changed to show the symbol of Tabanas, the government's 1970-established national savings scheme, and the slogan 'MENABUNG UNTUK MENUNJANG PEMBANGUNAN' ('save to support development') 223 million were minted.

Both of these coins were also sold to collectors as part of UN FAO sets.

=== 1978–1979: updated coinage ===
The 1973 100 rupiah was given an updated reverse design in 1978, reading 'HUTAN UNTUK KESEJAHTERAAN' (Forest for welfare), '1978' and a motif of the gunungan wayang. The coin was also made thinner, although its diameter did not change. This was the fourth and final Indonesian FAO coin.

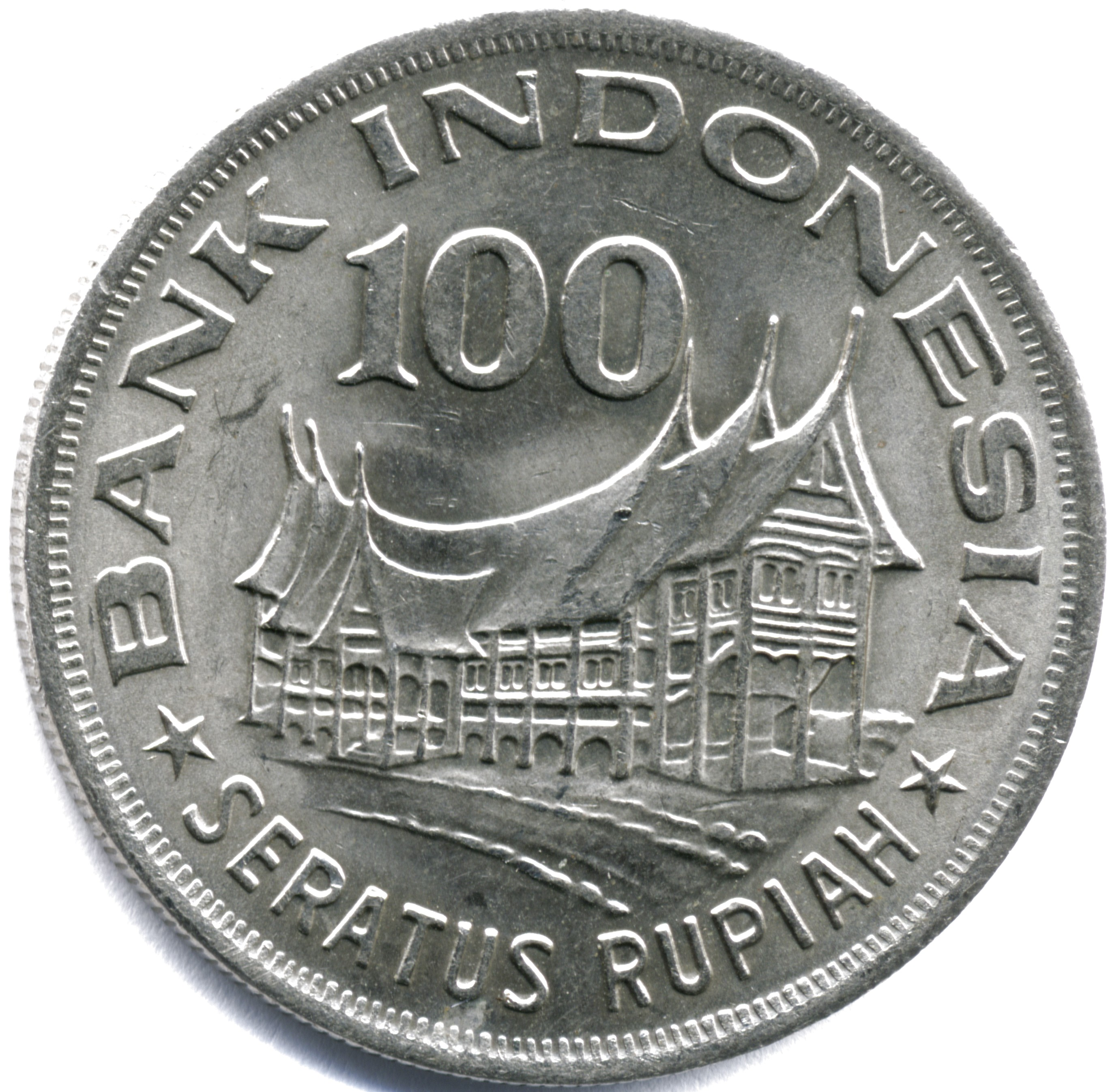
100 rupiah 1978 obverse

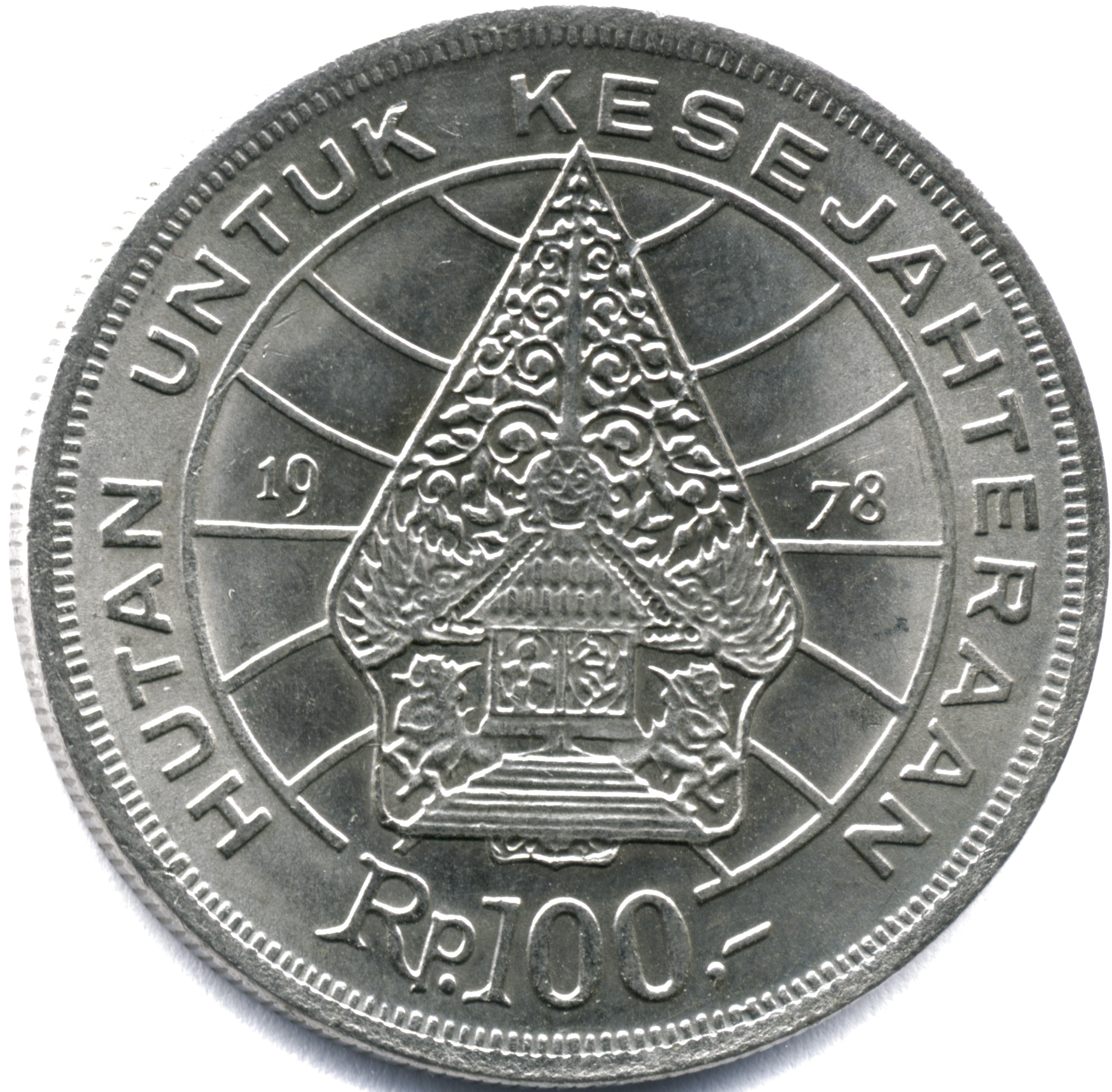
100 rupiah 1978 reverse

The 1974 5 rupiah, meanwhile, was updated '1979', issued from March 1980, retaining its family planning message, but adding a circular decoration to both reverse and obverse of the coin, and being shrunk in size from 3.0 to 1.4 grams, presumably to cut the cost of production. 413 million coins were minted dated 1978, while 5 million were later issued dated 1995 and 1996.

The 1974 10 rupiah was similarly updated with decoration to '1979', enlarged, and the composition changed to aluminium. 286 million were minted with this date. No 10 rupiah coins have since been issued.

All coin from 1970-1979 series, except Rp 1 coin from 1970 series, has been demonetised, with the 2 rupiah coins from 1970 series and the Rp 10 from 1971, 1974, 1979 series ceased to be legal tender since 15 November 1996, the 5 rupiah coin from 1970 and 1974 series, Rp 25 and Rp 50 coin from 1971 series, Rp 100 coin from 1973 and 1978 series being made invalid for transactions since 25 June 2002, the Rp 5 coin from 1979 coins (alongside Rp 50 and Rp 100 coins from 1991 series, see below) are no longer legal tender on 30 November four years later.

=== 1991: updated coinage ===
From 1979, no new coin designs were made in Indonesia until 1991. For new coinage, the old style of a large number was replaced instead with the national Garuda Pancasila logo, with the year and "BANK INDONESIA" in smaller text below the emblem.

A 25 rupiah coin dated 1991 in aluminium, with images of nutmeg and its Indonesian text "Buah Pala" and "Rp 25" on the reverse, was the smallest coin to be revised. The same coin was also minted 1992–1996, with mintages each year of 30, 64, 20, 250, 185, and 5 million. No 25 rupiah coins have been issued since 1996.

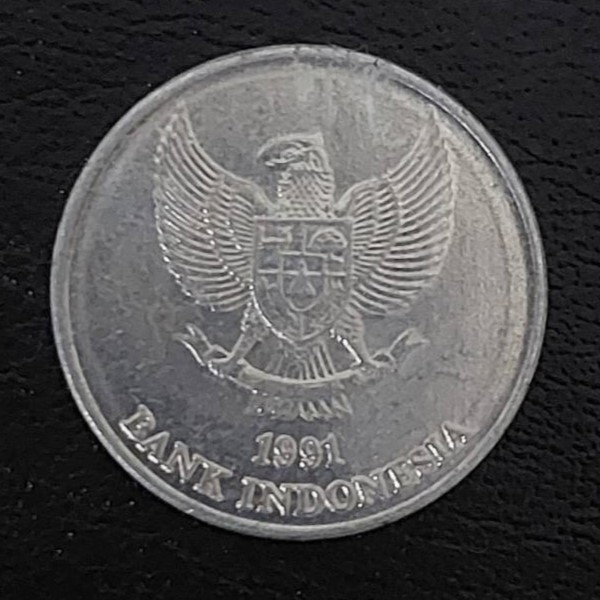
25 rupiah 1991 obverse

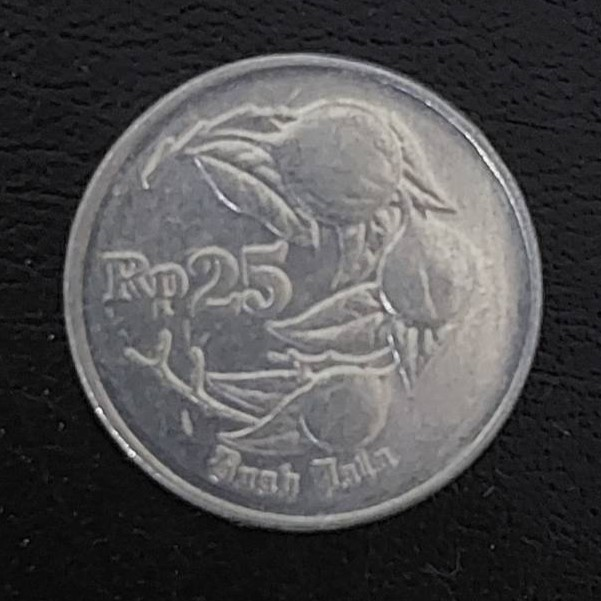
25 rupiah 1991 reverse

A 50 rupiah coin, backed with a Komodo dragon and the text "Komodo," was issued in aluminium-bronze, dated 1991, and later 1992, 1993, 1994, 1995, 1996, 1997 and 1998. Mintages were 67, 120, 300, then 590 million, then 150,000 each year.

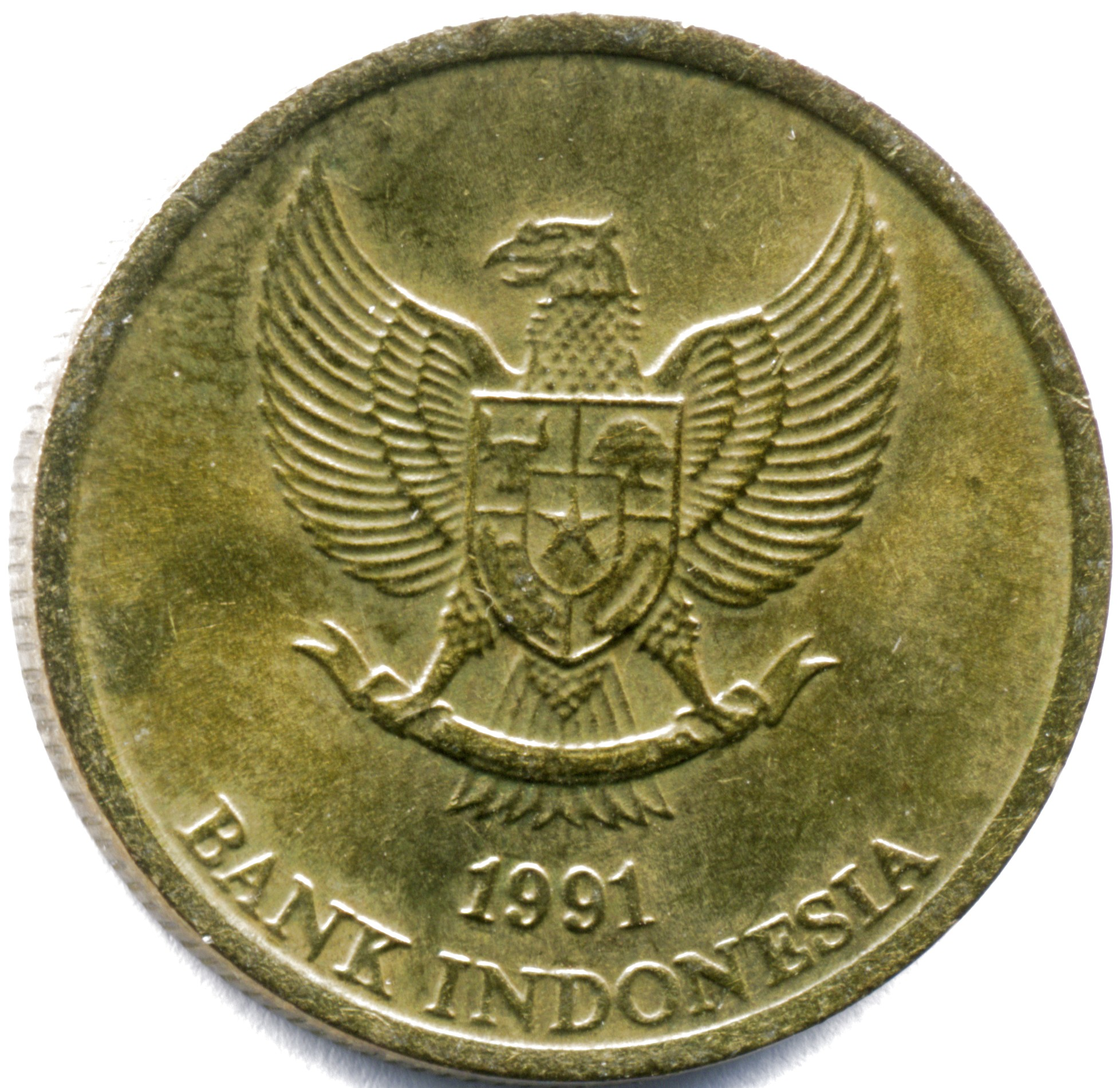
50 rupiah 1991 obverse

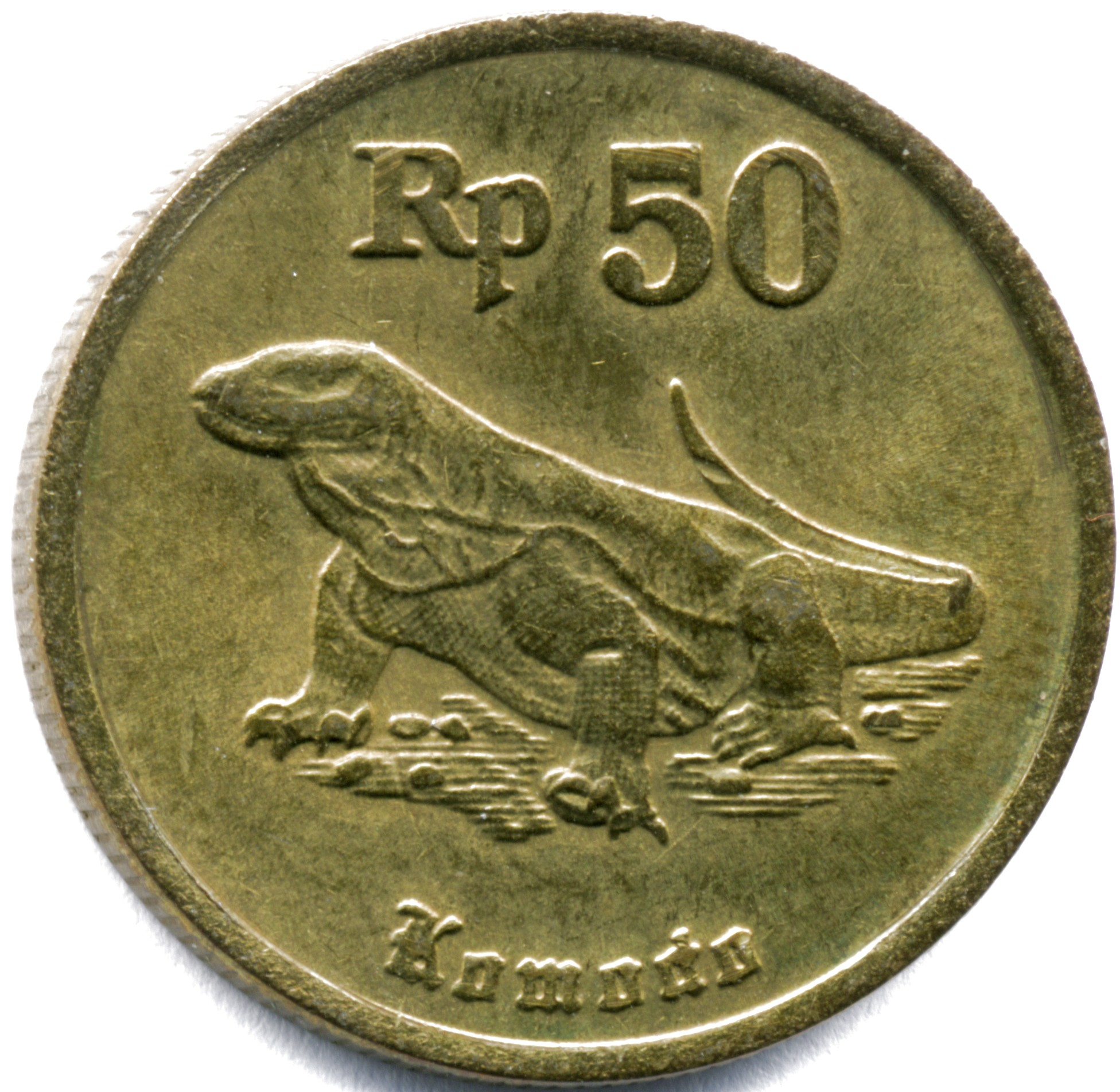
50 rupiah 1991 reverse

The 100 rupiah, also aluminium-bronze was inscribed with an octagon, featuring the reverse design of running bulls with the text karapan sapi (bull racing). The coin was minted 1991 through 1998, with respective mintages of 94, 120, 300, 550, 799, 41, 150, and 56 million.

A 500 rupiah coin, also in aluminium-bronze, became the first new coin denomination since 1973, with a value at issue of around US$0.20. The coin depicted on its reverse the jasmine flower with the text "bunga melati". This coin was minted dated 1991 and 1992, with mintages of 71 million then 100 million.

All coins of this series have since been demonetised, with the 100 and 50 rupiah coins being stripped off its legal tender status since 30 November 2006, 25 rupiah coin being made invalid for transactions since 31 August 2010, and 500 rupiah coins (together with 1,000 rupiah coin from 1993 series and 500 rupiah coin from 1997 series, see in next section) being ceased as legal tender since 1 December 2023.

=== 1993-1997: 1,000 rupiah coin introduced and revised coin of the 500 rupiah ===
1993 extended the range of coin denominations, adding Rp1,000, then worth around US$0.40 a bimetallic coin of copper-nickel and aluminium-bronze. This coin depicts an oil palm (Indonesian: kelapa sawit), and bears the mint years of 1993, 1994, 1995, 1996, 1997 and 2000.

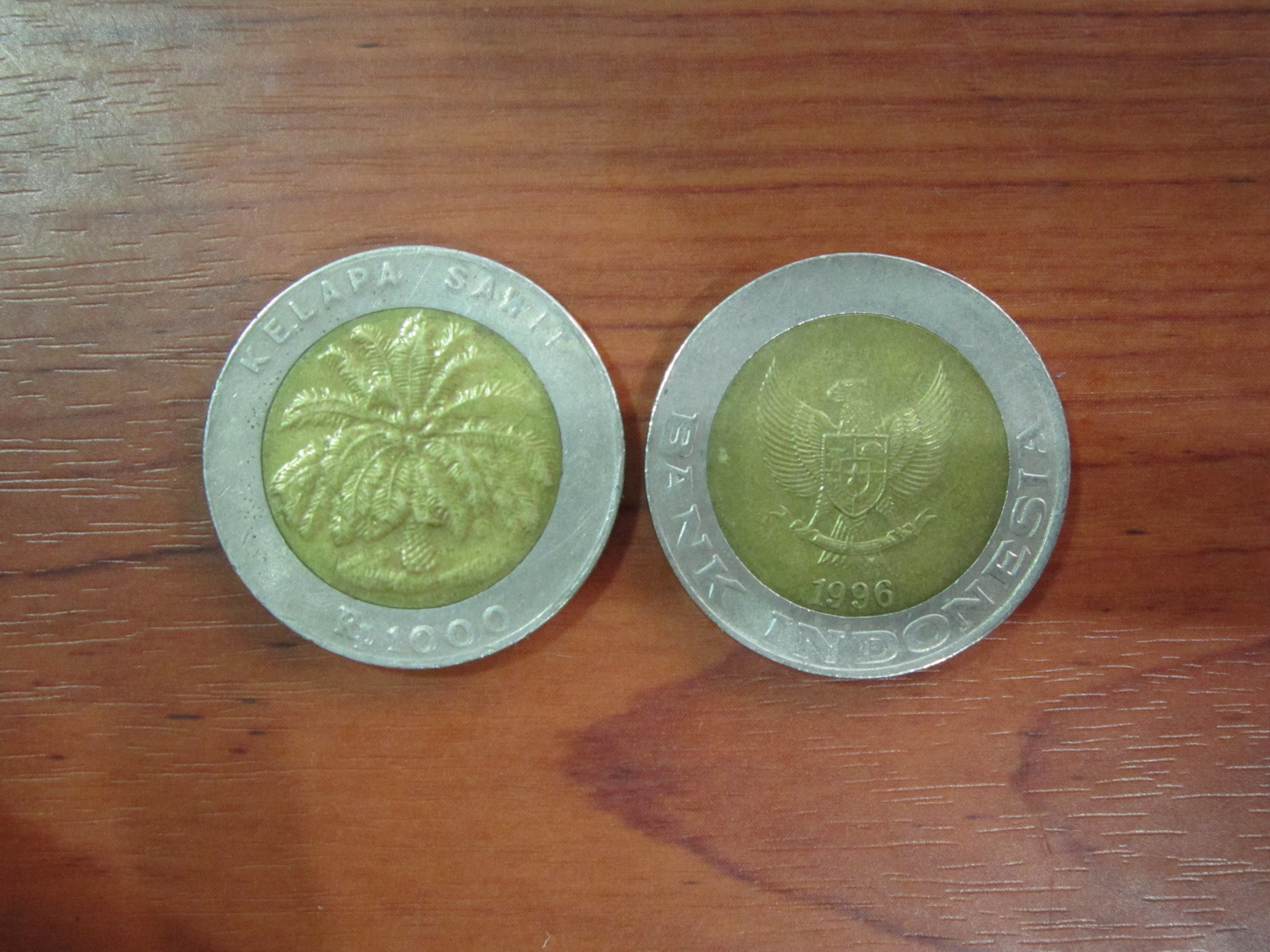
Two coins of this kind, with the second one bearing the mint year 1996

Four years later, the 500 rupiah coin was updated '1997' with a smaller jasmine leaf above a large central '500' with smaller lower 'rupiah', and the same aluminium-bronze material. The coin was minted dated 1997, 2000, 2001, 2002 and 2003.

All coins of this series, including the 500 rupiah coin from 1991 edition which was withdrawn on 1 December 2023, are legal tender.

== Cent (sen) coinage of the rupiah from Reformation (1999–present) ==
=== 1999: coin revisions ===
In 1999, Bank Indonesia updated 50 rupiah coin, which was struck in aluminium showing the black-naped oriole. As with the 500 rupiah (from 1997 edition), the reverse of the coin has a larger numerical denomination. Dates are 1999, 2001 and 2002.

The 100 rupiah coin was also altered in the same manner to aluminium from '1999', depicting the palm cockatoo. Mint dates are each year from 1999 through 2005.

=== 2003: 200 rupiah coin introduced and revised coin of the 500 rupiah ===
2003 saw the introduction of the aluminium 200 rupiah coin depicting the Bali starling (jalak bali) as a new circulating denomination in the same style as the 50 and 100 rupiah coins; these coins were dated 2003. Meanwhile, the jasmine 500 rupiah coin was again redesigned, with its composition changed to aluminium, its size enlarged, updated reverse design, and its date changed to 2003.

=== 2010: updated 1,000 rupiah coin ===
Along with launched the revision (2005 issue) of 10,000 rupiah in 2010, Bank Indonesia updated the 1,000 rupiah coin, featuring the reverse design of Angklung and Gedung Sate in background. The coin was issued in nickel-plated steel, replaced the previous coin.

=== 2016: coin revisions, introduced National Heroes ===
The most recent coin revisions in Indonesia occurred in December 2016. The new coins were released along with the new banknotes. For the first time, there are actual people depicted in non-commemorative coins. Herman Johannes is depicted for 100 rupiah, Tjipto Mangoenkoesoemo on 200 rupiah, T. B. Simatupang on 500 rupiah, and I Gusti Ketut Pudja on 1,000 rupiah coins.

== Circulating coinage of the Indonesian rupiah ==
As of 2024, three series of coins circulate: aluminium coins dated 1999-2003, nickel-plated steel Rp1,000 coins dated 2010, and National Heroes of Indonesia coins dated 2016; the former three are rarely seen in circulation as they are often sold nowadays as collector's items at prices above face value due to its rarity.

Indonesian rupiah coins
| Image | | Technical Data | | | | | Description | | Obverse | Reverse | Availability |
| Obverse | Reverse | Value | Series | Diameter | Thickness | Material | Weight | Edge | Obverse | Reverse | Availability |
| | | Rp 50 | 1999 | 20 mm | 2 mm | Aluminium | 1.36 g | Smooth | Garuda Pancasila | Kepodang bird and coin value | Low |
| | | Rp 100 | 1999 | 23 mm | 2 mm | Aluminium | 1.79 g | Smooth | Garuda Pancasila | Palm cockatoo bird and coin value | High |
| | | Rp 100 | 2016 | 23 mm | 2 mm | Aluminium | 1.79 g | Smooth | Coin value | Herman Johannes and Garuda Pancasila | High |
| | | Rp 200 | 2003 | 25 mm | 2.3 mm | Aluminium | 2.38 g | Smooth | Garuda Pancasila | Bali starling bird and coin value | High |
| | | Rp 200 | 2016 | 25 mm | 2.2 mm | Aluminium | 2.38 g | Smooth | Coin value | Tjipto Mangoenkoesoemo and Garuda Pancasila | High |
| | | Rp 500 | 2003 | 27 mm | 2.5 mm | Aluminium | 3.1 g | Alternating Smooth and Reeded | Garuda Pancasila | Jasmine flower and coin value | High |
| | | Rp 500 | 2016 | 27 mm | 2.35 mm | Aluminium | 3.1 g | Alternating Smooth and Reeded | Coin value | T. B. Simatupang and Garuda Pancasila | High |
| | | Rp 1,000 | 2010 | 24.15 mm | 1.6 mm | Nickel plated steel | 4.5 g | Smooth | Garuda Pancasila and coin value | Angklung and Gedung Sate | High |
| | | Rp 1,000 | 2016 | 24.10 mm | 1.45 mm | Nickel plated steel | 4.5 g | Smooth | Coin value | I Gusti Ketut Pudja and Garuda Pancasila | High |

== Commemorative coins ==
Although circulating coins in Indonesia have never been made from precious metals, a number of special issues have been made since coins were reintroduced to Indonesia in 1970 from either silver or gold. As commemorative coins, they were all sold above their intrinsic value, and also above their nominal value.

All the coins struck are proof coinage, with the exception of the WWF 1974 series which were issued with non-proof 50% silver, and non-proof gold.

With the exception of the silver coinage from the WWF conservation series, which are in good supply, most of the coins are relatively scarce and command good premiums to their bullion value.

The following issues have been made:

| Issued | Series | Material | Nominal Value | Diameter | Thickness | Purity | Weight | Obverse | Reverse | Mintage Limit | Mint | Notes | AGW/ASW (troy ounces) | Withdrawal |
|---|---|---|---|---|---|---|---|---|---|---|---|---|---|---|
| 1970 | 25th Anniversary of Independence | Silver | Rp 200 | 26 mm | | 0.999 | 8g | "1945–1970" "200 RUPIAH" "1970" Garuda Pancasila | "REPUBLIK INDONESIA" "25 TAHUN KEMERDEKAAN" greater bird of paradise | 5100 | Arezzo Mint (Gori & Zucchi) | Only commemorative series with coin (↑↓) orientation. Some gold coins bear the Monnaie de Paris mintmark. || 0.2569 | 30 August 2021 | |
| 1970 | 25th Anniversary of Independence | Silver | Rp 250 | 30 mm | | 0.999 | 10g | "1945–1970" "250 RUPIAH" "1970" Garuda Pancasila | "REPUBLIK INDONESIA" "25 TAHUN KEMERDEKAAN" Statue of Manjusri from Tumpang Temple, Malang | 5,000 | Arezzo Mint (Gori & Zucchi) | Only commemorative series with coin (↑↓) orientation. Some gold coins bear the Monnaie de Paris mintmark. || 0.2569 | 30 August 2021 | 0.3212 |
| 1970 | 25th Anniversary of Independence | Silver | Rp 500 | 40 mm | | 0.999 | 20g | "1945–1970" "500 RUPIAH" "1970" Garuda Pancasila | "REPUBLIK INDONESIA" "25 TAHUN KEMERDEKAAN" Female Wayang Dancer | 4,800 | Arezzo Mint (Gori & Zucchi) | Only commemorative series with coin (↑↓) orientation. Some gold coins bear the Monnaie de Paris mintmark. || 0.2569 | 30 August 2021 | 0.6423 |
| 1970 | 25th Anniversary of Independence | Silver | Rp 750 | 45 mm | | 0.999 | 30g | "1945–1970" "750 RUPIAH" "1970" Garuda Pancasila | "REPUBLIK INDONESIA" "25 TAHUN KEMERDEKAAN" Balinese eagle carving | 4,950 | Arezzo Mint (Gori & Zucchi) | Only commemorative series with coin (↑↓) orientation. Some gold coins bear the Monnaie de Paris mintmark. || 0.2569 | 30 August 2021 | 0.9635 |
| 1970 | 25th Anniversary of Independence | Silver | Rp 1,000 | 55 mm | | 0.999 | 40g | "1945–1970" "1000 RUPIAH" "1970" Garuda Pancasila | "REPUBLIK INDONESIA" "25 TAHUN KEMERDEKAAN" Soedirman | 4,250 | Arezzo Mint (Gori & Zucchi) | Only commemorative series with coin (↑↓) orientation. Some gold coins bear the Monnaie de Paris mintmark. || 0.2569 | 30 August 2021 | 1.2847 |
| 1970 | 25th Anniversary of Independence | Gold | Rp 2,000 | 18 mm | | 0.900 | 4.93g | "1945–1970" "2000 RUPIAH" "1970" Garuda Pancasila | "REPUBLIK INDONESIA" "25 TAHUN KEMERDEKAAN" greater bird of paradise | 2,970 | Arezzo Mint and limited quantities in Monnaie de Paris | Only commemorative series with coin (↑↓) orientation. Some gold coins bear the Monnaie de Paris mintmark. || 0.2569 | 30 August 2021 | 0.1426 |
| 1970 | 25th Anniversary of Independence | Gold | Rp 5,000 | 30 mm | | 0.900 | 12.34g | "1945–1970" "5000 RUPIAH" "1970" Garuda Pancasila | "REPUBLIK INDONESIA" "25 TAHUN KEMERDEKAAN" Statue of Manjusri from Tumpang Temple, Malang | 2,150 | Arezzo Mint and limited quantities in Monnaie de Paris | Only commemorative series with coin (↑↓) orientation. Some gold coins bear the Monnaie de Paris mintmark. || 0.2569 | 30 August 2021 | 0.3571 |
| 1970 | 25th Anniversary of Independence | Gold | Rp 10,000 | 40 mm | | 0.900 | 24.68g | "1945–1970" "10000 RUPIAH" "1970" Garuda Pancasila | "REPUBLIK INDONESIA" "25 TAHUN KEMERDEKAAN" Female Wayang Dancer | 1,440 | Arezzo Mint and limited quantities in Monnaie de Paris | Only commemorative series with coin (↑↓) orientation. Some gold coins bear the Monnaie de Paris mintmark. || 0.2569 | 30 August 2021 | 0.7141 |
| 1970 | 25th Anniversary of Independence | Gold | Rp 20,000 | 50 mm | | 0.900 | 49.37g | "1945–1970" "20000 RUPIAH" "1970" Garuda Pancasila | "REPUBLIK INDONESIA" "25 TAHUN KEMERDEKAAN" Balinese eagle carving | 1,285 | Arezzo Mint and limited quantities in Monnaie de Paris | Only commemorative series with coin (↑↓) orientation. Some gold coins bear the Monnaie de Paris mintmark. || 0.2569 | 30 August 2021 | 1.4285 |
| 1970 | 25th Anniversary of Independence | Gold | Rp 25,000 | 55 mm | | 0.900 | 61.71g | "1945–1970" "25000 RUPIAH" "1970" Garuda Pancasila Serial number (001-970) | "REPUBLIK INDONESIA" "25 TAHUN KEMERDEKAAN" Soedirman | 970 | Arezzo Mint and limited quantities in Monnaie de Paris | Only commemorative series with coin (↑↓) orientation. Some gold coins bear the Monnaie de Paris mintmark. || 0.2569 | 30 August 2021 | 1.7855 |
| 1974 | WWF and IUCN Endangered Animals Conservation Series | Silver | Rp 2,000 | 38.61 mm | 2.75 mm | 0.925 | 28.28g | "BANK INDONESIA" "1974" Garuda Pancasila | Javan tiger "Rp 2000" | 18,000 proof | Royal Mint | Similar coins issued in 11 other countries | 30 August 2021 | 0.841 |
| 1974 | WWF and IUCN Endangered Animals Conservation Series | Silver | Rp 2,000 | 38.61 mm | 2.75 mm | 0.500 | 25.65g | "BANK INDONESIA" "1974" Garuda Pancasila | Javan tiger "Rp 2000" | 43,000 | Royal Mint | Similar coins issued in 11 other countries | 30 August 2021 | 0.4123 |
| 1974 | WWF and IUCN Endangered Animals Conservation Series | Silver | Rp 5,000 | 42 mm | 2.87 mm | 0.925 | 35.00g | "BANK INDONESIA" "1974" Garuda Pancasila | Orangutan "Rp 5000" | 17,000 proof | Royal Mint | Similar coins issued in 11 other countries | 30 August 2021 | 1.0408 |
| 1974 | WWF and IUCN Endangered Animals Conservation Series | Silver | Rp 5,000 | 42 mm | 2.87 mm | 0.500 | 32.00g | "BANK INDONESIA" "1974" Garuda Pancasila | Orangutan "Rp 5000" | 43,000 | Royal Mint | Similar coins issued in 11 other countries | 30 August 2021 | 0.5144 |
| 1974 | WWF and IUCN Endangered Animals Conservation Series | Gold | Rp 100,000 | 34 mm | 2.49 mm | 0.900 | 33.437g | "BANK INDONESIA" "1974" Garuda Pancasila | Komodo dragon "Rp 100000" | 5,333 plus 1,369 proof | Royal Mint | Similar coins issued in 11 other countries | 30 August 2021 | 0.9675 |
| 1987 | WWF 25th Anniversary | Silver | Rp 10,000 | 36 mm | | 0.925 | 19.44g | "BANK INDONESIA" "1987" Garuda Pancasila | Babirusa "Rp 10000" | 25,000 | Royal Mint | Similar coins issued in 16 other countries | 30 August 2021 | 0.5781 |
| 1987 | WWF 25th Anniversary | Gold | Rp 200,000 | 25 mm | 1.7 mm | 0.917 | 10g | "BANK INDONESIA" "1987" Garuda Pancasila | Javan rhinoceros "Rp 200000" | 5,000 | Royal Mint | | 30 August 2021 | 0.2948 |
| 1990 | 70th Anniversary of Save The Children | Silver | Rp 10,000 | 36 mm | | 0.925 | 19.44g | "BANK INDONESIA" "1990" Garuda Pancasila | "SAVE THE CHILDREN" "10000 RUPIAH" 2 Children playing badminton | 20,000 | Royal Mint | Similar coins minted in 22 other countries | 30 August 2021 | 0.5781 |
| 1990 | 70th Anniversary of Save The Children | Gold | Rp 200,000 | 25 mm | 1.7 mm | 0.917 | 10g | "BANK INDONESIA" "1990" Garuda Pancasila | "SAVE THE CHILDREN" "200000 RUPIAH" Balinese Dancer | 3,000 | Royal Mint | Actual mintage differs to mintage limit. | 30 August 2021 | 0.2948 |
| 1990 | 45th Anniversary of Independence | Gold | Rp 125,000 | 20 mm | 1.6 mm | 0.9583 | 8g | Garuda Pancasila "1990" "BANK INDONESIA | Museum Joang 45 (Museum of Struggle) "125000 RUPIAH" | 16,000 | Royal Mint | Actual mintage differs to mintage limit. | 30 August 2021 | 0.2464 |
| 1990 | 45th Anniversary of Independence | Gold | Rp 250,000 | 25 mm | 2.2 mm | 0.9583 | 17g | Garuda Pancasila "1990" "BANK INDONESIA | "NUSANTARA" "1945–1990" "250000 RUPIAH" Map of Indonesia | 16,000 | Royal Mint | | 30 August 2021 | 0.5236 |
| 1990 | 45th Anniversary of Independence | Gold | Rp 750,000 | 35 mm | 3.1 mm | 0.9583 | 45g | Garuda Pancasila "1990" "BANK INDONESIA | Garuda Pancasila with text "ANGKATAN 45" and wreath of rice and cotton. "750000 RUPIAH" | 16,000 | Royal Mint | Edge lettering "★ MERDEKA" | 30 August 2021 | 1.386 |
| 1995 | 50th Anniversary of Independence | Gold | Rp 300,000 | 25 mm | 1.85 mm | 0.9589 | 17g | "BANK INDONESIA" "1995" "300000 RUPIAH" Garuda Pancasila | "50 TAHUN R.I." Suharto speaking to the people | 3,000 sets | PERURI | Serial number stamped on edge | 0.5237 | 30 August 2022 |
| 1995 | 50th Anniversary of Independence | Gold | Rp 850,000 | 35 mm | 2.78 mm | 0.9589 | 50g | "BANK INDONESIA" "1995" "850000 RUPIAH" Garuda Pancasila | "LIMA PULUH TAHUN KEMERDEKAAN REPUBLIK INDONESIA" Suharto | 3,000 sets | PERURI | Serial number stamped on edge | 1.5404 | 30 August 2022 |
| 1999 | UNICEF Children of the World Coin Collection (UNICEF 50th Anniversary) | Silver | Rp 10,000 | 38.61 mm | | 0.925 | 28.28g | "BANK INDONESIA" "1999" Garuda Pancasila | "FOR THE CHILDREN OF THE WORLD" "Rp 10000" Boy and Girl Scout planting one of a million trees | 25,000 | PERURI and the Hungarian Mint. | Similar coins issued in other countries. Due to the Asian financial crisis, actual mintage differs to mintage limit. | 0.841 | 31 January 2025 |
| 1999 | UNICEF Children of the World Coin Collection (UNICEF 50th Anniversary) | Gold | Rp 150,000 | 22 mm | | 0.9999 | 6.22g | "BANK INDONESIA" "1999" Garuda Pancasila | "FOR THE CHILDREN OF THE WORLD" "Rp 150000" Boy on kuda lumping (Javanese bamboo horse for dancing) | 10,000 | PERURI and the Hungarian Mint. | Similar coins issued in other countries. Due to the Asian financial crisis, actual mintage differs to mintage limit. | 0.1998 | 31 January 2025 |
| 2001 | 100th Anniversary of 'Bung Karno' | Silver | Rp 25,000 | 38.61 mm | | 0.925 | 28.28g | "BANK INDONESIA" "2001" Garuda Pancasila | "100 TAHUN BUNG KARNO (1901–2001)" "Rp 25000" Bust of Sukarno in profile | 500 | PERURI | | 0.841 | N/A |
| 2001 | 100th Anniversary of 'Bung Karno' | Gold | Rp 500,000 | 28.2 mm | | 0.9999 | 15g | "BANK INDONESIA" "2001" Garuda Pancasila | "100 TAHUN BUNG KARNO (1901–2001)" "Rp 500000" Bust of Sukarno facing left | 500 | PERURI | | 0.4818 | N/A |
| 2002 | Centennial Anniversary of 'Bung Hatta' | Silver | Rp 25,000 | 38.61 mm | | 0.9995 | 28.29g | "BANK INDONESIA" "2002" Garuda Pancasila Hatta Foundation Logo | "SATU ABAD BUNG HATTA (1902–2002)" "Rp 25000" Bust of Hatta looking left | 2,000 | PERURI | Actual mintage differs to mintage limit. | 0.841 | N/A |
| 2002 | Centennial Anniversary of 'Bung Hatta' | Gold | Rp 500,000 | 28.2 mm | | 0.9999 | 15g | "BANK INDONESIA" "2002" Garuda Pancasila Hatta Foundation Logo | "SATU ABAD BUNG HATTA (1902–2002)" "Rp 500000" Bust of Hatta looking right | 2,000 | PERURI | Actual mintage differs to mintage limit. | 0.4818 | N/A |
