= Indonesian 200-rupiah coin =

Indonesian coin

Two hundred rupiah
- Indonesia
- Value: Rp 200
- Mass: 2.38 g
- Diameter: 25 mm
- Thickness: 2 mm
- Edge: Smooth
- Composition: Aluminium
- Years of minting: 2003-present (updated 2016)

Obverse
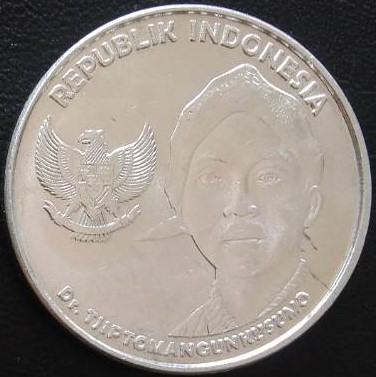
- Designer: Bank of Indonesia
- Design date: 2016

Reverse
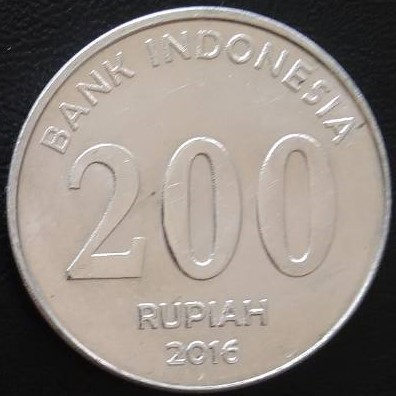
- Designer: Bank of Indonesia
- Design date: 2016

The Indonesian two hundred rupiah coin (Rp200) is a denomination of the Indonesian rupiah. It was first introduced in 2003 and was revised in its current form on 19 December 2016.

== First issue (2003) ==
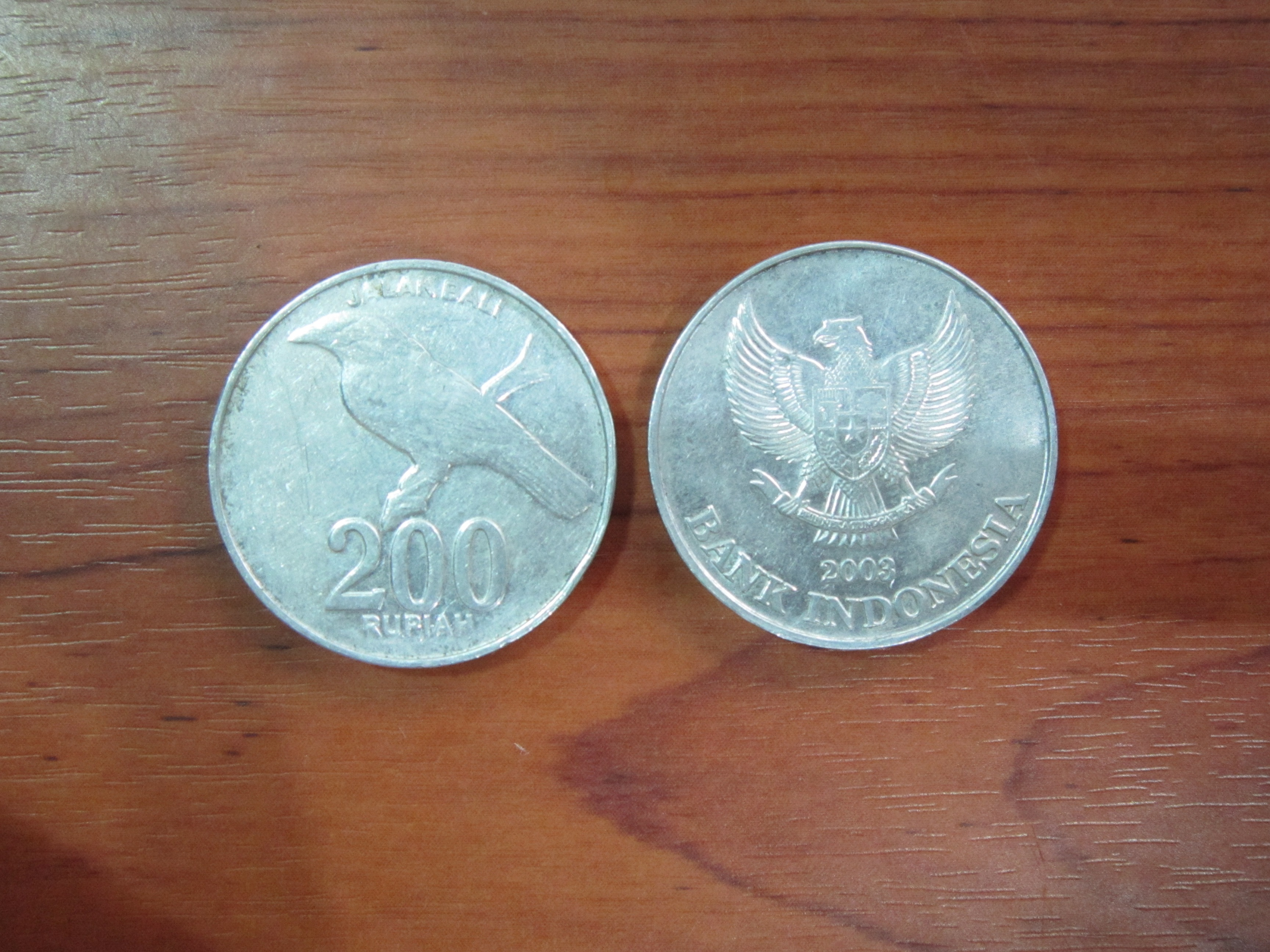
Two 2003-issue Rp200 coins.

The Rp200 coin was first introduced on 3 November 2003. It weighs 2.38 g (0.084 oz), is 2.3 mm (0.091 in) wide, and has a 25 mm (0.98 in) diameter. Its obverse features the national emblem Garuda Pancasila and the lettering "2003" and "BANK INDONESIA," while its reverse features an image of the Bali mynah (Leucopsar rothschildi) as well as the lettering "JALAK BALI" (BALI MYNAH) and "200 RUPIAH."

== Second issue (2016) ==
The coin was updated on 19 December 2016 to its current form, with its obverse now depicting Dr. Tjiptomangunkusumo as well as the national emblem Garuda Pancasila and the lettering "REPUBLIK INDONESIA" and "Dr. TJIPTOMANGUNKUSUMO." Meanwhile, its reverse depicts the lettering "BANK INDONESIA" "200 RUPIAH," and "2016." These coins weigh 2.38 g (0.084 oz), are 2 mm (0.079 in) wide, and have a 25 mm (0.98 in)diameter.

== Non-circulating commemorative coin (1970) ==
Alongside the two circulating variants, the Bank of Indonesia also minted a non-circulating silver coin of this value in 1970. It weighs 8 g (0.28 oz) and has a diameter of 26 mm (1.0 in). Its obverse features the national emblem Garuda Pancasila, the lettering "1945-1970," "1970," and "200 RUPIAH," and the Bank's logo. Meanwhile, its reverse depicts the greater bird-of-paradise (Paradisaea apoda) and the lettering "25 TAHUN KEMERDEKAAN" (25 YEARS OF INDEPENDENCE) and "REPUBLIK INDONESIA."

== See also ==
- Indonesian rupiah
- Coins of the rupiah
