= Indonesian 25-rupiah coin =

Indonesian coin

Twenty five rupiah
- Indonesia
- Value: Rp 25
- Mass: 1.22 g (0.04303 oz)
- Diameter: 18 mm (0.7086 in)
- Thickness: 1.98 mm (0.0779 in)
- Edge: Smooth
- Composition: Cupronickel (1971-1990); Aluminum (1991-1996)
- Years of minting: 1971-1996

Obverse
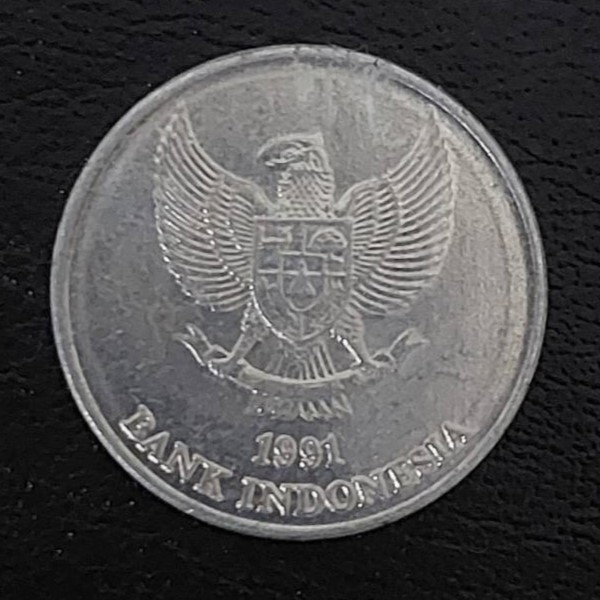
- Designer: Bank of Indonesia
- Design date: 1991

Reverse
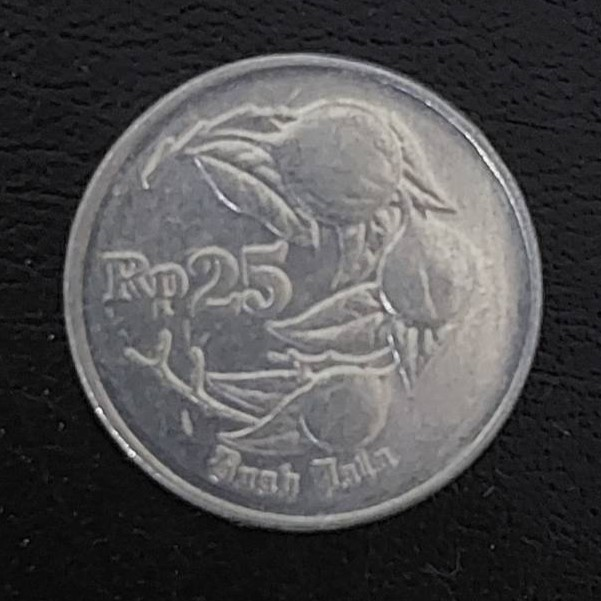
- Designer: Bank of Indonesia
- Design date: 1991

The Indonesian twenty five rupiah coin (Rp25) is a now-defunct denomination of the Indonesian rupiah. It was introduced in 1971 and was last revised in 1991. Coins of this denomination were minted until 1996 and have been invalid for transactions since 31 August 2010 when the 1991-issue Rp25 coin ceased to be legal tender.

== First issue (1971-1990) ==
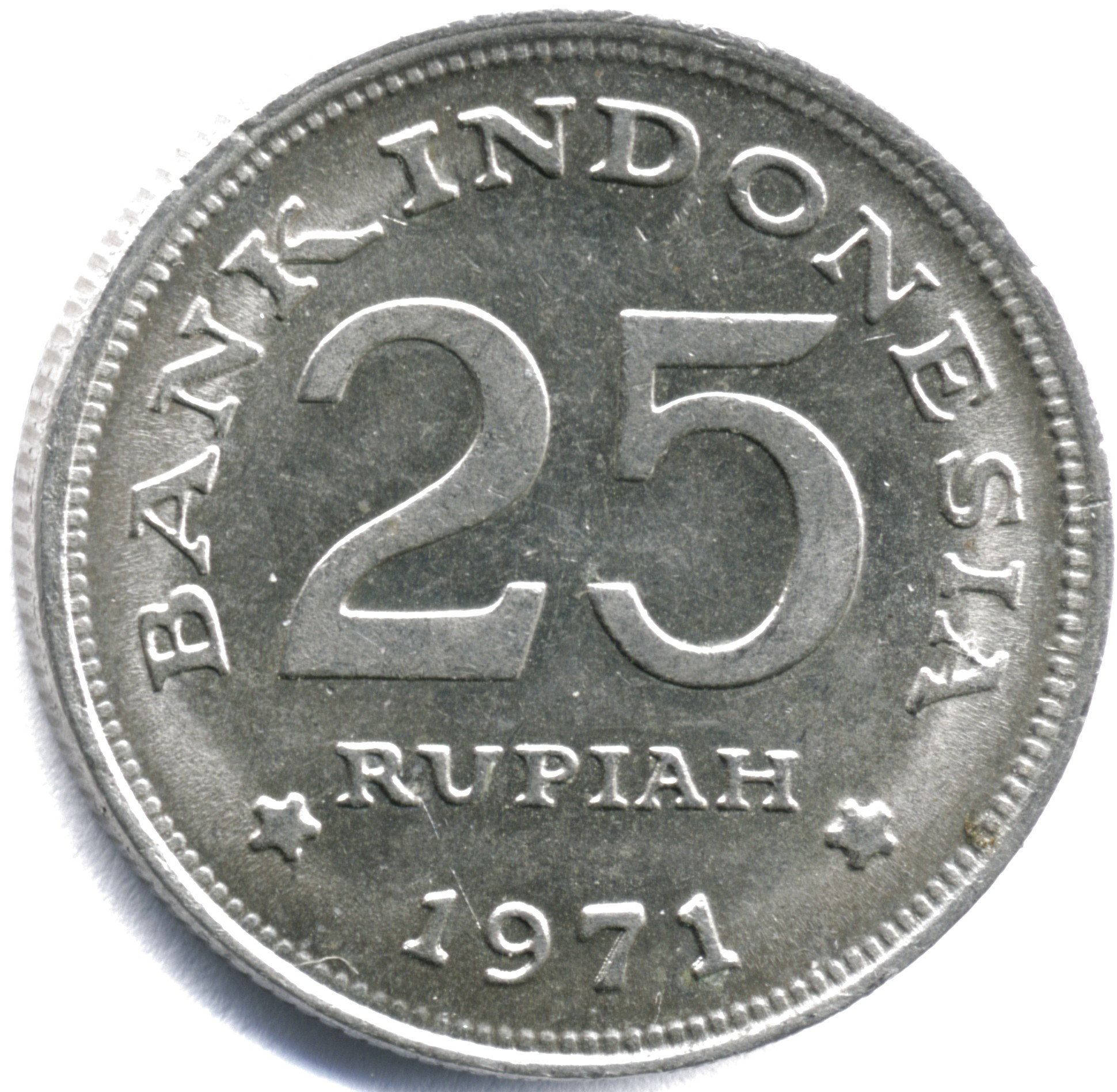
Obverse of 1971 issue

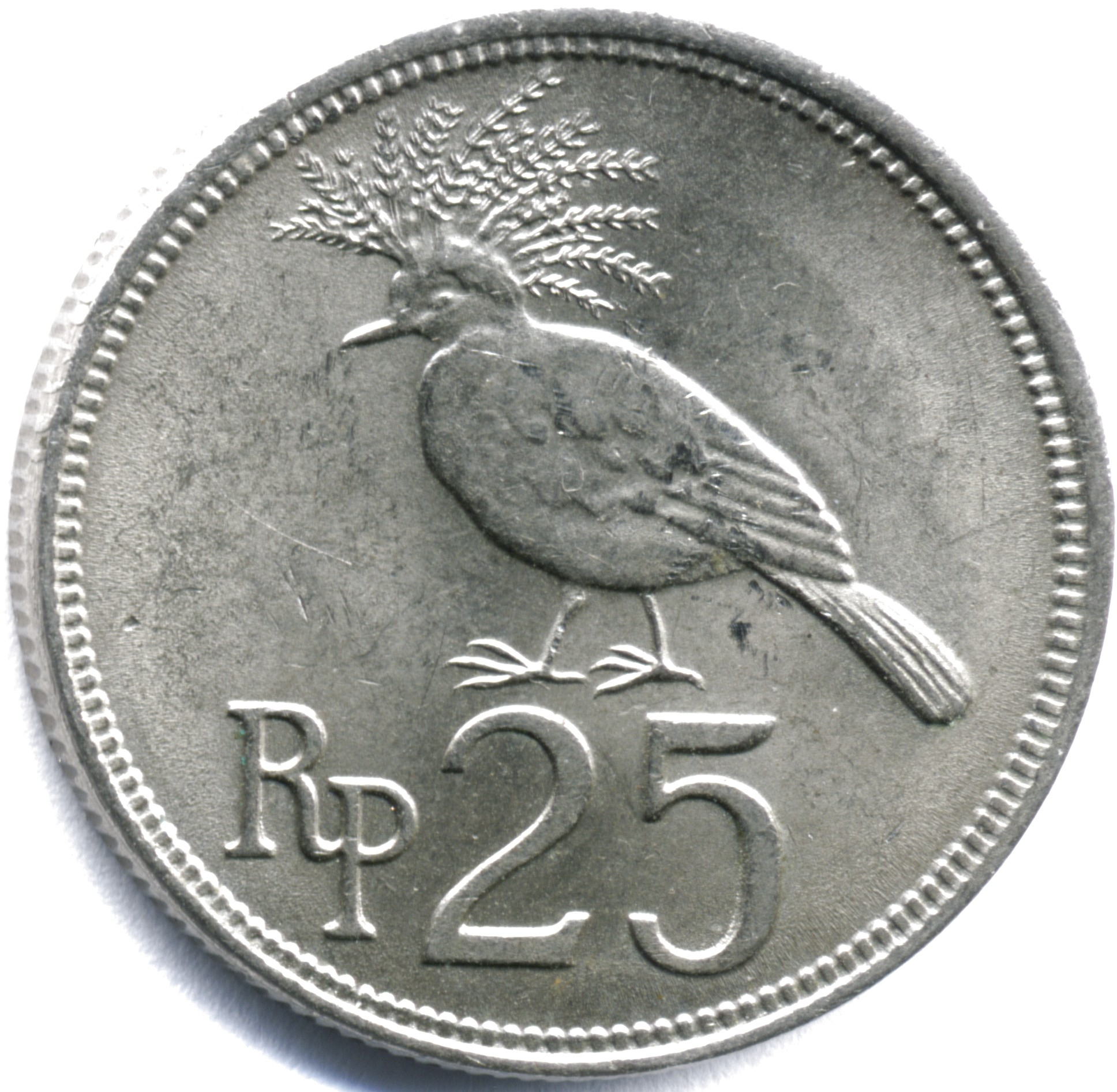
Reverse of 1971 issue

The first Rp25 coins were minted in 1971 as cupronickel coins. They had a 20 mm (0.79 in) diameter, were 1.25 mm (0.049 in) thick, weighed 3.52 g (0.124 oz), and had a milled edge. Their obverse featured the lettering "BANK INDONESIA" and "25 RUPIAH" as well as two stars, while their reverse depicted an image of the Victoria crowned pigeon (Goura victoria) as well as the lettering "Rp25." These coins ceased to be legal tender on June 25, 2002, and were redeemable in general banks until 24 June 2007 and in Bank Indonesia offices until 24 June 2012.

== Second issue (1991-1996) ==
The Bank of Indonesia revised the Rp25 coin for the second and last time on 16 December 1991, as an aluminum coin. It had an 18mm diameter, was 1.98mm thick, weighed 1.22g, and had a plain edge. Its obverse featured the national emblem Garuda Pancasila, the mint year (e.g., "1996"), and the lettering "BANK INDONESIA," while its reverse featured an image of a nutmeg plant (Myristica fragrans) as well as the lettering "Rp25" and "Buah Pala" (Nutmeg). These coins ceased to be legal tender on 31 August 2010, due to its extremely low value, which makes them undesirable for making transactions, and were redeemable in general banks until 30 August 2015 and in Bank Indonesia offices until 31 August 2020.

== See also ==
- Indonesian rupiah
- Coins of the rupiah
