= Indonesian 1,000-rupiah coin =

Indonesian coin

One thousand rupiah
- Indonesia
- Value: Rp 1,000
- Mass: 4.5 g
- Diameter: 24.1 mm
- Thickness: 1.6 mm
- Edge: Smooth
- Composition: Nickel-plated steel
- Years of minting: 1993–present (updated 2010, 2016)

Obverse
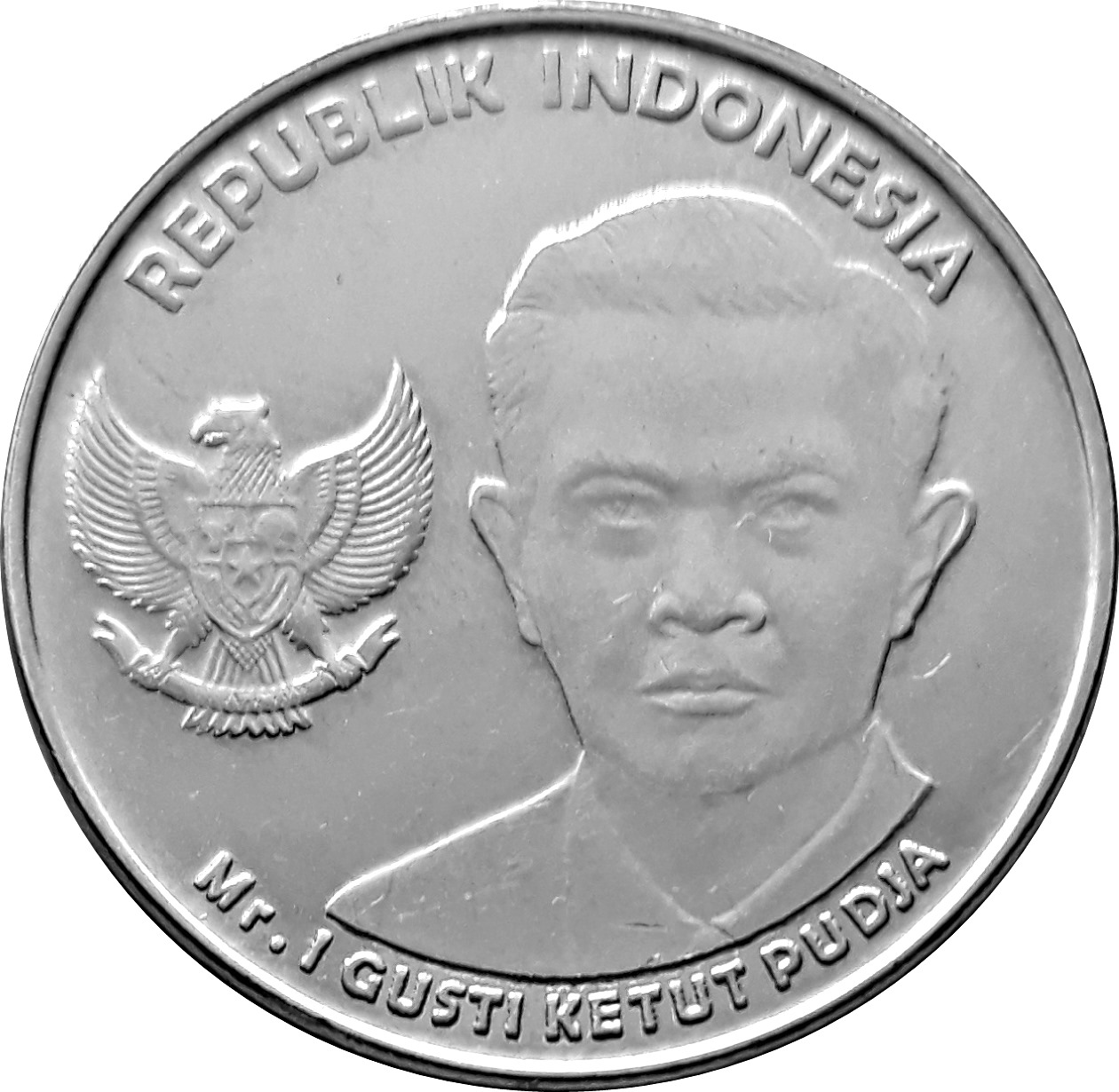
- Designer: Bank of Indonesia
- Design date: 2016

Reverse
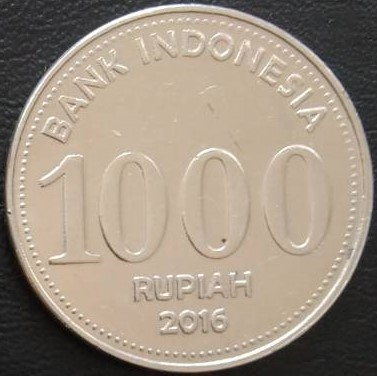
- Designer: Bank of Indonesia
- Design date: 2016

The Indonesian one thousand rupiah coin (Rp1,000) is a coin of the Indonesian rupiah. It circulates alongside the 1,000-rupiah banknote. First introduced on 8 March 1993 as a bimetallic coin, it is now minted as a unimetallic coin, with the first of its kind appearing in 2010 and its latest revision being in 2016. As of 2024, the last two series in this denomination are legal tender.

== First issue (1993-1997, 2000) ==
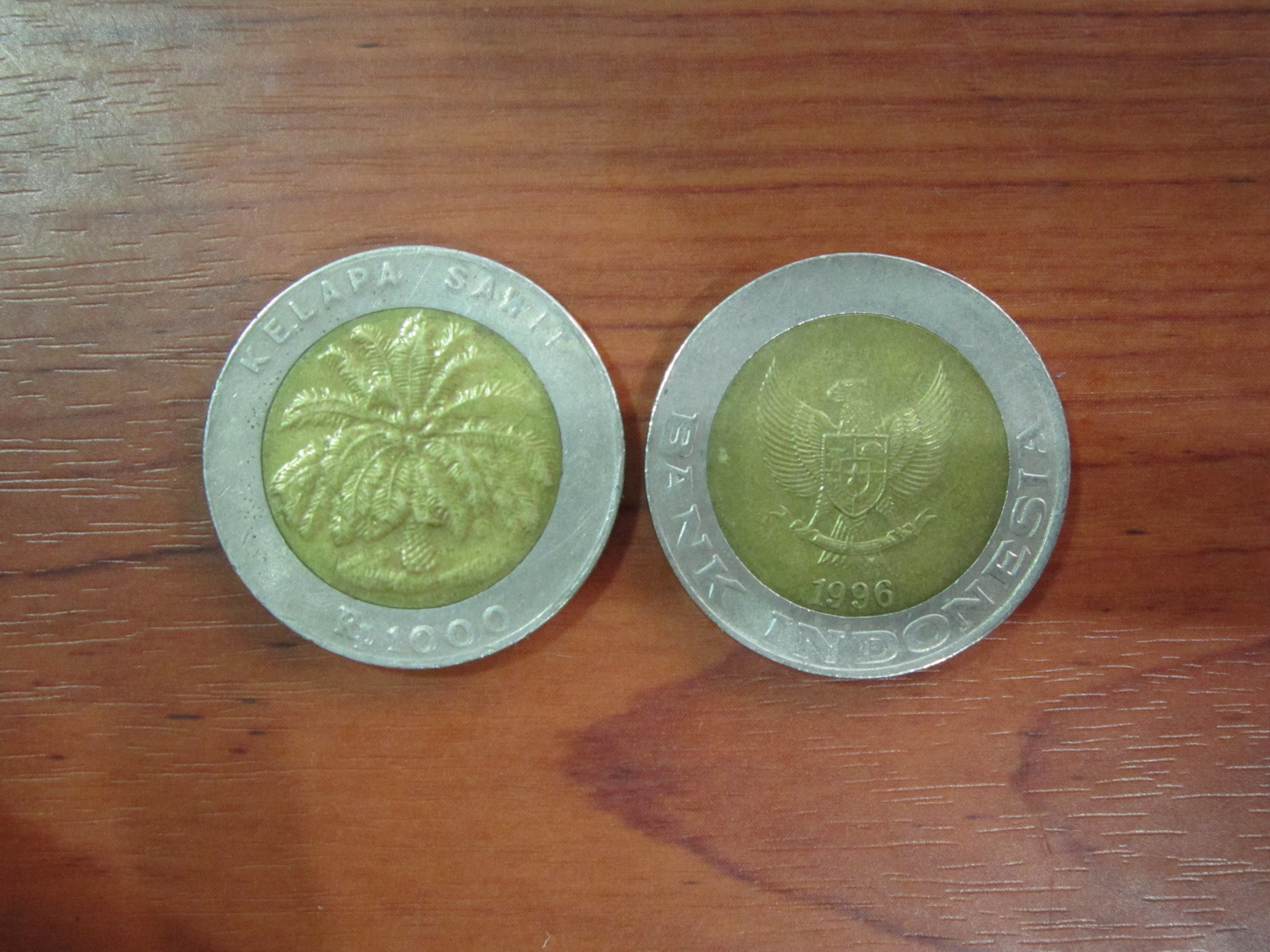
Two 1993-issue Rp1000 coins, with the second one minted in 1996.

This is the first issue of the 1,000-rupiah coin. Being bimetallic, it has a cupronickel outer edge and an inner circle made out of aluminum-nickel-bronze alloy. It weighs 8.6 g (0.30 oz), has a 26 mm (1.0 in) diameter, is 2.2 mm (0.087 in) thick, and has a jagged edge. The coin's obverse features the national emblem Garuda Pancasila with the year of issue in its aluminum-nickel-bronze inner circle and the lettering "BANK INDONESIA" on its cupronickel outer ring, while its reverse features an oil palm in the inner circle with the lettering "KELAPA SAWIT" (oil palm) as well as "Rp1000" on the outer ring. These coins were minted in 1993, 1994, 1995, 1996, 1997, and 2000, with its key dates being 1994 and 1997

This coin is subject to a controversy where several online vendors sell this coin for up to Rp100 million apiece while in reality these coins are only sold at a retail price of Rp3,000 through Rp10,000 apiece, with the highest proof-grade coins being worth up to Rp4,000,000.

This coin was demonetised on 1 December 2023 and is exchangeable at both commercial banks and Bank Indonesia offices until 1 December 2033.

== Second issue (2010) ==
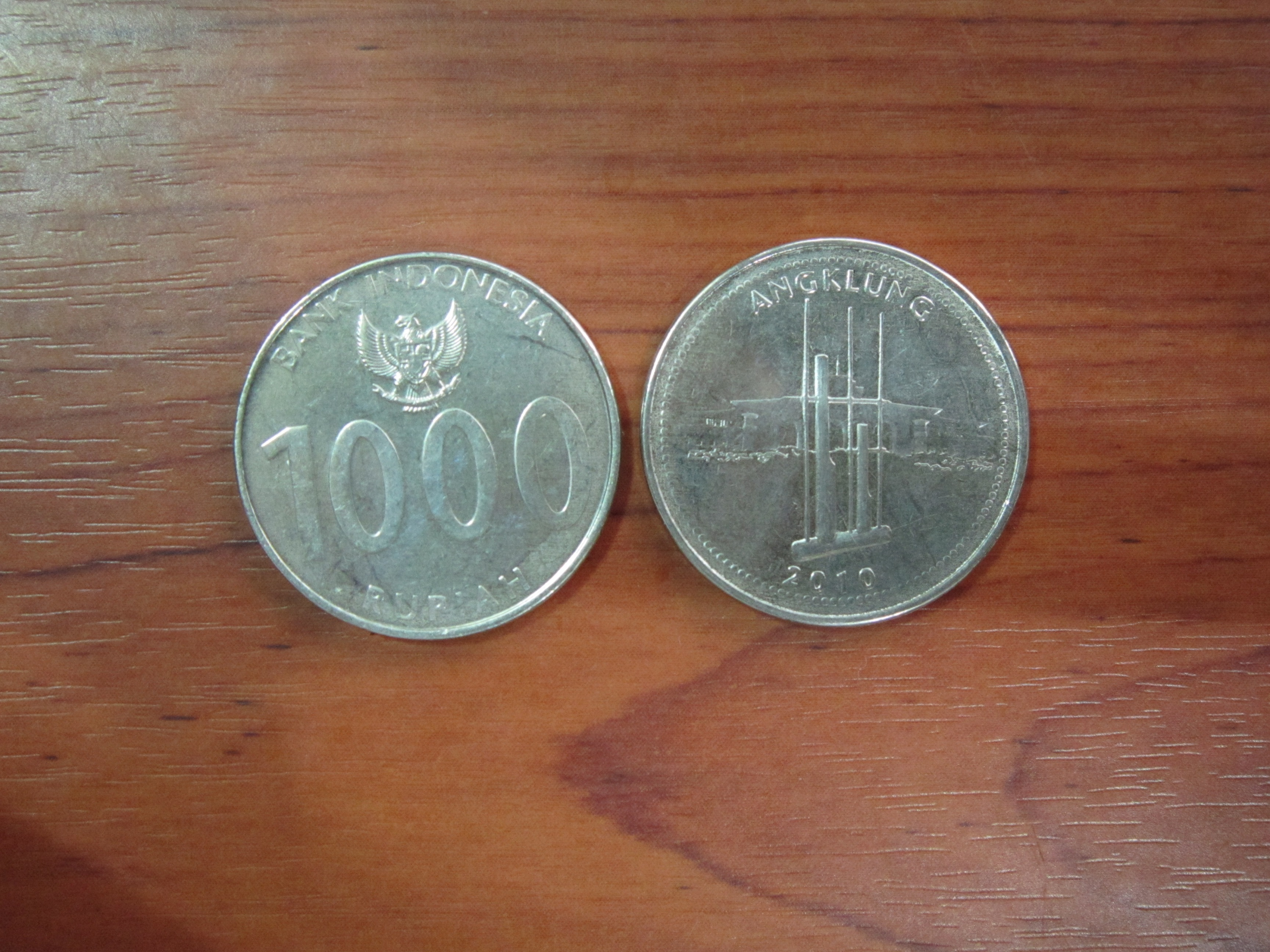
Two 2010-issue Rp1000 coins.

The Rp1,000 coin was reminted again, this time as a unimetallic coin made out of nickel-plated steel, in 2010. It was first announced on 20 July of that year. Its obverse contains the national emblem Garuda Pancasila and the lettering "1000 RUPIAH," while its reverse depicts the West Javanese musical instrument angklung and the Gedung Sate complex in its capital Bandung together with the letterings "ANGKLUNG" and "2010." Its diameter is 24.15 mm (0.951 in), is 1.6 mm (0.063 in) thick, weighs 4.5 g (0.16 oz), and has a smooth edge.

== Third issue (2016) ==
The Rp1,000 coins were redesigned on 19 December 2016. Its obverse now features the national hero I Gusti Ketut Puja, the national emblem Garuda Pancasila, and the lettering "REPUBLIK INDONESIA." Meanwhile, the reverse now contains the lettering "BANK INDONESIA," "1000 RUPIAH," and "2016," as well as a relief in the form of circles encircling its inner edge. Coins of this kind are minted with nickel-plated steel, weigh 4.5 g (0.16 oz), have a 24.1 mm (0.95 in) diameter, is 1.45 mm (0.057 in) thick, and has a smooth edge.

== Non-circulating commemorative coin (1970) ==
Alongside the three circulating coins, the Bank of Indonesia also once minted a silver Rp1,000 non-circulating coin to commemorate Indonesia's 25th independence anniversary in 1970. This coin weighs 40 g (1.4 oz), has a diameter of 55 mm (2.2 in), and has a reeded edge. On the obverse is the national emblem Garuda Pancasila, the Bank of Indonesia's logo, and the lettering "1945-1970" and "1000 RUPIAH" alongside the year of issue (1970). Meanwhile, the reverse of the coin features General Sudirman's portrait as well as the lettering "25 TAHUN KEMERDEKAAN" and "REPUBLIK INDONESIA."

== See also ==
- Indonesian rupiah
- Coins of the rupiah
