= Herman Johannes =

Indonesian professor, scientist and politician (1912–1992)

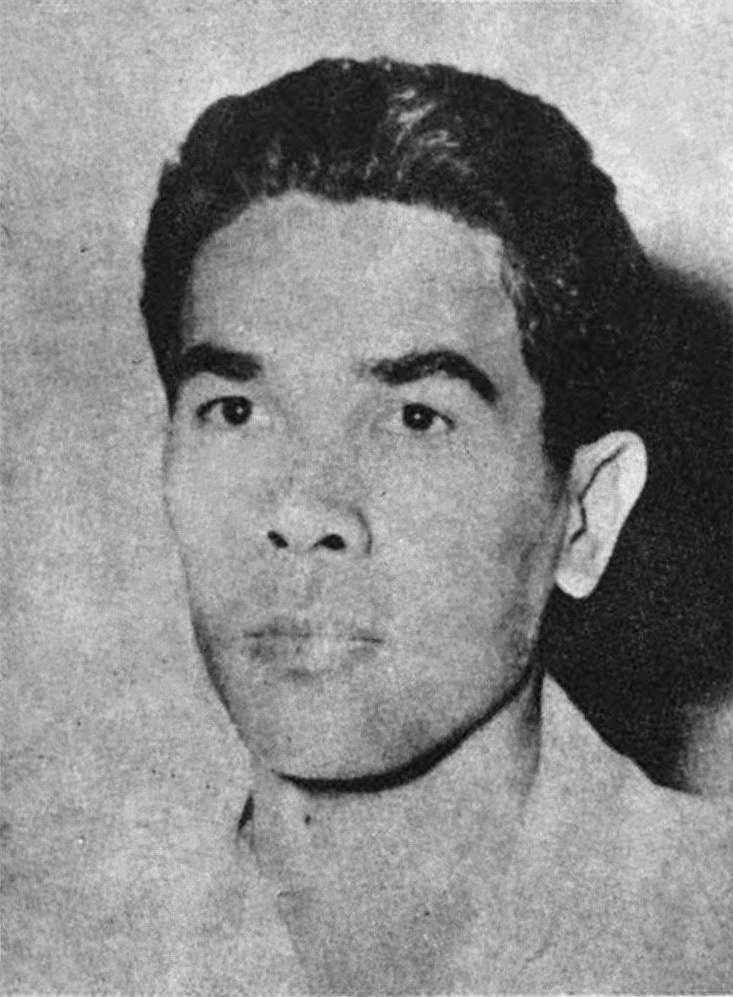

7th Minister of Public Works of the Republic of Indonesia
- In office 6 September 1950 – 27 April 1951
- President: Sukarno
- Preceded by: Mananti Sitompul
- Succeeded by: Ukar Bratakusumah

2nd Rector of Gadjah Mada University
- In office 1961–1966
- Preceded by: M. Sardjito
- Succeeded by: M. Nazir Alwi

Personal details
- Born: 28 May 1912 Rote, Dutch East Indies
- Died: 17 October 1992 (aged 80) Yogyakarta, Indonesia

Herman Johannes (28 May 1912 – 17 October 1992) was an Indonesian professor, scientist, politician and National Hero. Johannes was the rector of Universitas Gadjah Mada in Yogyakarta (1961–1966), Coordinator for Higher Education from 1966 to 1979, a member of Indonesia's Presidential Supreme Advisory Council (Dewan Pertimbangan Agung or DPA) from 1968 to 1978, and the Minister for Public Works and Energy (1950–1951). He was also a member of the Executive Board of UNESCO from 1954 to 1957.

== Biography ==
Herman Johannes graduated from Technische Hogeschool (THS) in Bandung, West Java, an institution which was moved to Yogyakarta in 1946 during the war of independence with the Dutch. The institution later became the embryo of Gadjah Mada University.

During his academic career, Johannes carried out research on rural technology, including inventing a charcoal stove designed especially for the poor, which used biomass charcoal briquettes for fuel. Johannes also investigated other types of alternative fuels and explored the possibility of turning agricultural waste into fuel.

Herman Johannes was involved in the military in 1940s. He was the head of the Indonesian Army Arsenal Laboratory during the independence war against Dutch occupation. His laboratory produced explosives such as smoke bombs and hand grenades which were used by Indonesian guerrillas to sabotage the movement of the Dutch military in Central Java.

Herman Johannes married Annie Marie Gilbertine Amalo in 1955. They had four children: Christine, Henriette, Daniel Johannes and Helmi Johannes, a newscaster at the VOA.

Johannes was decorated with the Guerilla Medal in 1958 and Mahaputra Medal in 1973 by the Indonesian government. Herman Johannes died on 17 October 1992 of prostate cancer. He was buried at the Universitas Gadjah Mada Cemetery in Sawitsari, Yogyakarta. In November 2009, he was honored by the Indonesian government as a National Hero.

== Legacy ==
The Indonesian government honored Herman Johannes and named the Greater Forest Park in Kupang Regency in East Nusa Tenggara province after him. His name is used for a boulevard in downtown Yogyakarta.

His face is also depicted in the 100 Indonesian rupiah coins denomination in 2016.

== Education ==
- Melayu School, Baa, Rote Island, East Nusa Tenggara, Indonesia 1921
- Europesche Lagere School (ELS), Kupang, East Nusa Tenggara, Indonesia 1922
- Meer Uitgebreid Lager Onderwijs (MULO), Makassar, South Sulawesi, Indonesia 1928
- Algemene Middelbare School (AMS), Batavia, Java, Indonesia 1931
- Technische Hogeschool (THS), Bandung, West Java, Indonesia 1934

== Career ==
- Teacher, Cursus tot Opleiding van Middelbare Bouwkundingen (COMB), Bandung, 1940
- Teacher, High Middle School (SMT), Batavia, Java 1942
- Lecturer of Physics, Medical High School, Salemba, Jakarta, 1943
- Lecturer, Technical High School (STT) Bandung in Yogyakarta, 1946–1948
- Professor, STT Bandung in Yogyakarta, June 1948
- Dean, Technical Faculty, Universitas Gadjah Mada (UGM), Yogyakarta, 1951–1956
- Dean, Faculty of Natural Sciences (FIPA), Gadjah Mada University, Yogyakarta, 1955–1962
- Rector, Universitas Gadjah Mada, Yogyakarta, 1961–1966
- Coordinator of Higher Education (Koperti), Yogyakarta and Central Java, 1966–1979
- Chairman, Regional Science and Development Center (RSDC), Yogyakarta, 1969

== Career (others) ==
- Member, Central Indonesian National Committee (KNIP), 1945–1946
- Minister of Public Works and Energy, Indonesia, 1950–1951
- Member, Executive Board of UNESCO, 1954–1957
- Member, National Council, 1957–1958
- Member, National Development Council (Deppernas), 1958–1962
- Member, Supreme Advisory Council (Dewan Pertimbangan Agung or DPA) Indonesia, 1968–1978
- Member Commission of Four, 1970
- Member, Committee for Technical Terms, Department of Public Works, 1969–1975
- Member, Council of Indonesian-Malaysian Language (MABIM), 1972–1977
- Member, Indonesian National Research Council, 1985–1992

== Military career ==
- Head of Arsenal Laboratory, Army Headquarters, Yogyakarta, 1946
- Member of Military Academy Troops, Jogjakarta, Sector Sub-Wehrkreise 104, December 1948 – June 1949
- Lecturer, Military Academy, Yogyakarta, 1946–1948
- Last Rank: Army Major, 1949
- Commandant, Yogyakarta Student Regiment (Resimen Mahakarta), 1962–1965

== Organizations ==
- Christen Studenten Vereniging (CSV), Bandung, 1934
- Indonesische Studenten Vereniging (ISV), Bandung, 1934
- Timorese Jongeren/Chairman of Timorese Nationalist Group (PKT), Bandung, 1934
- Member, Indonesian Young Civil Servants Association (AMPRI), Jakarta, 1945
- Chairman, Indonesian Lesser Sunda People's Movement (GRISK), 1947
- Founder, Greater Indonesia Party (PIR) 1948
- Chairman, Hatta Foundation, 1950–1992
- Chairman of Gadjah Mada University Alumni Association (KAGAMA), 1958–1961, 1973–1981
- Had been the Head of Yogyakarta's Veterans Legion
- Had been in the Central Board of the Indonesian Veterans Legion (LVRI)
- Member of Indonesian Engineers Association (PII)
- Had been an Honorary Member of the Indonesian Academy of Sciences (AIPI)

== Decorations ==
- Guerilla Medal, 1958
- Medal of Indonesian Independence Struggle, 1961
- Medal of Wirakarya, 1971
- Mahaputra Medal, 1973
- Doctor Honoris Causa, Gadjah Mada University, 1975
- Veterans Legion Medal, 1981
- Honor of Sri Sultan Hamengkubuwono IX, 1991
- Indonesian National Hero, 2009

== Selected ==
- Basics of Modern Physics, (UGM, 1953)
- Pantjasila in the Words of Sukarno (UGM, 1963)
- Squeeze Techniques in Bridge (Indira, Jakarta, 1970)
- Introduction to Mathematics for Economics (with Budiono Sri Handoko; Pustaka LP3ES, Jakarta 1974)
- Scientific Language Terms (Gadjah Mada University, 1979)
- Developing Bahasa Indonesia into a Scientific, Aesthetic and Energetic Language, (UGM, 1980)
- Dictionary of Science and Technology (Indira, Jakarta, 1981)
- Various Techniques in Chess (Liberty, Yogyakarta, 1989)
