= Indonesian 50-rupiah coin =

Indonesian coin

Fifty rupiah
- Indonesia
- Value: Rp 50
- Mass: 1.36 g (0.0479 oz)
- Diameter: 20 mm (0.7874 in)
- Thickness: 2 mm (0.0787 in)
- Edge: Smooth
- Composition: Cupronickel (1971-1990); Aluminum-bronze (1991-1998); Aluminum (1999-2003)
- Years of minting: 1971-2003

Obverse
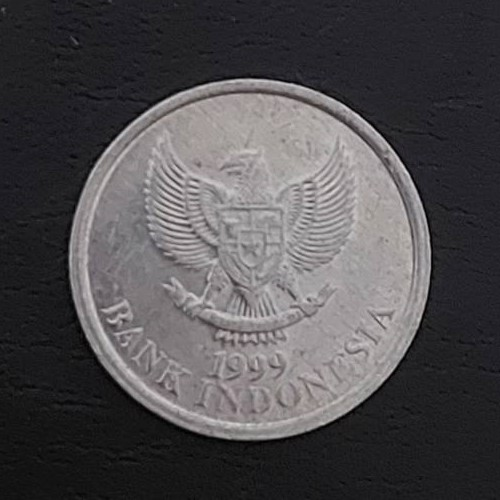
- Designer: Bank of Indonesia
- Design date: 1999

Reverse
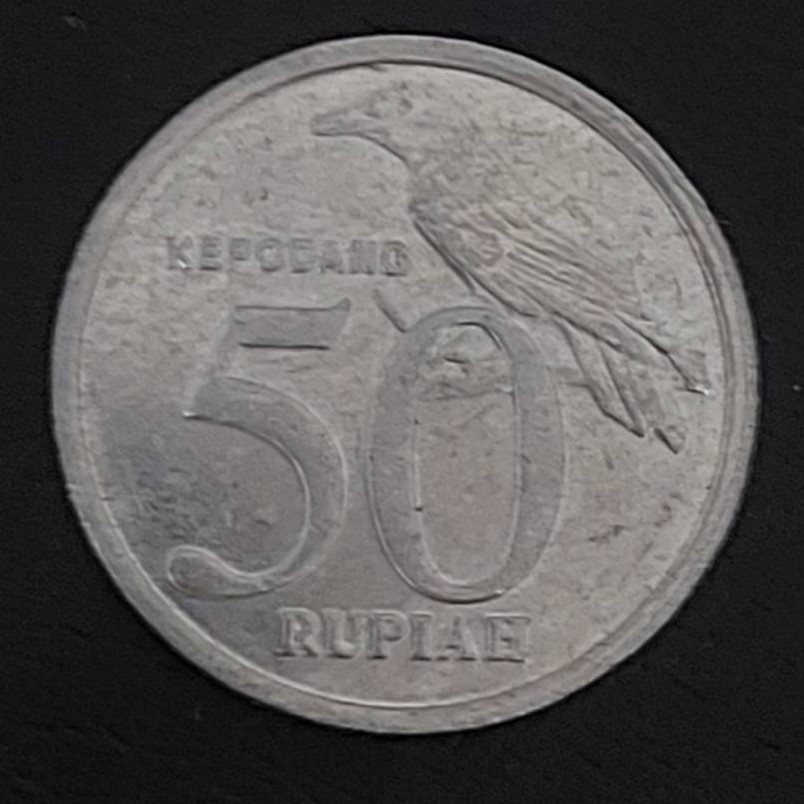
- Designer: Bank of Indonesia
- Design date: 1999

The fifty rupiah coin (Rp50) is a denomination of the Indonesian rupiah. It was first introduced in 1971 and last minted in 2003. As of 2020, only aluminium Rp50 coins dating from 1999 through 2003 remain legal tender, although it is rarely seen in circulation due to its extremely low value.

== First issue (1971-1990) ==
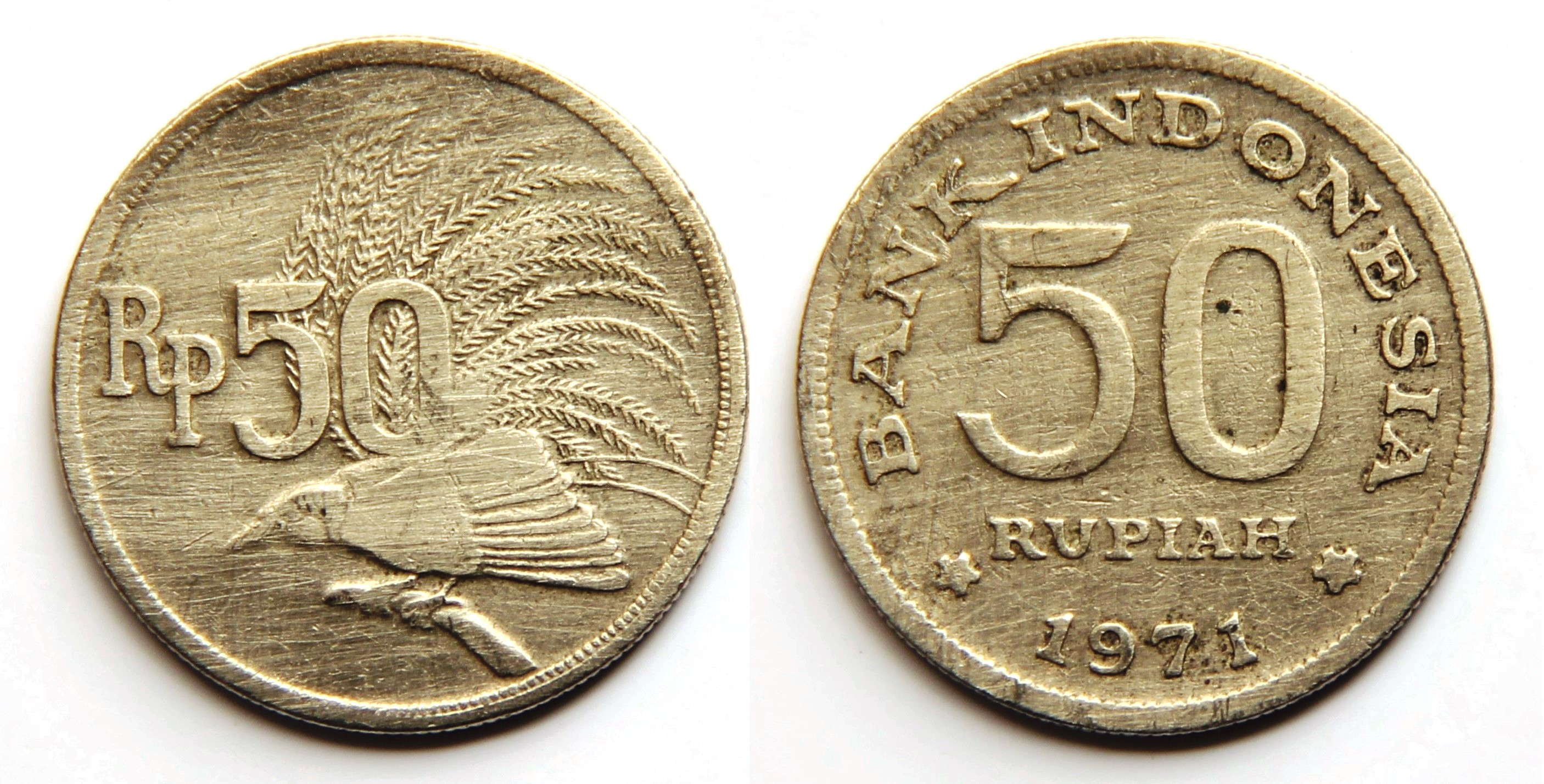
First Rp50 coin; to the left is the reverse, and the right is the obverse.

The Rp50 coin was first introduced in 1971 as a cupronickel coin that weighed 6.06 g (0.214 oz), had a 24 mm (0.94 in) diameter, was 1.5 mm (0.059 in) thick, and had a milled edge. Its obverse featured the lettering "BANK INDONESIA," "50 RUPIAH," and "1971," as well as two stars, while its reverse featured the lettering "Rp50" and a portrait of the greater bird-of-paradise (Paradisea apoda). A total of 1,035,435,000 coins were minted. These coins were demonetized on 25 June 2002, and were redeemable in commercial banks until 24 June 2007 and Bank Indonesia offices until 24 June 2012.

== Second issue (1991-1998) ==
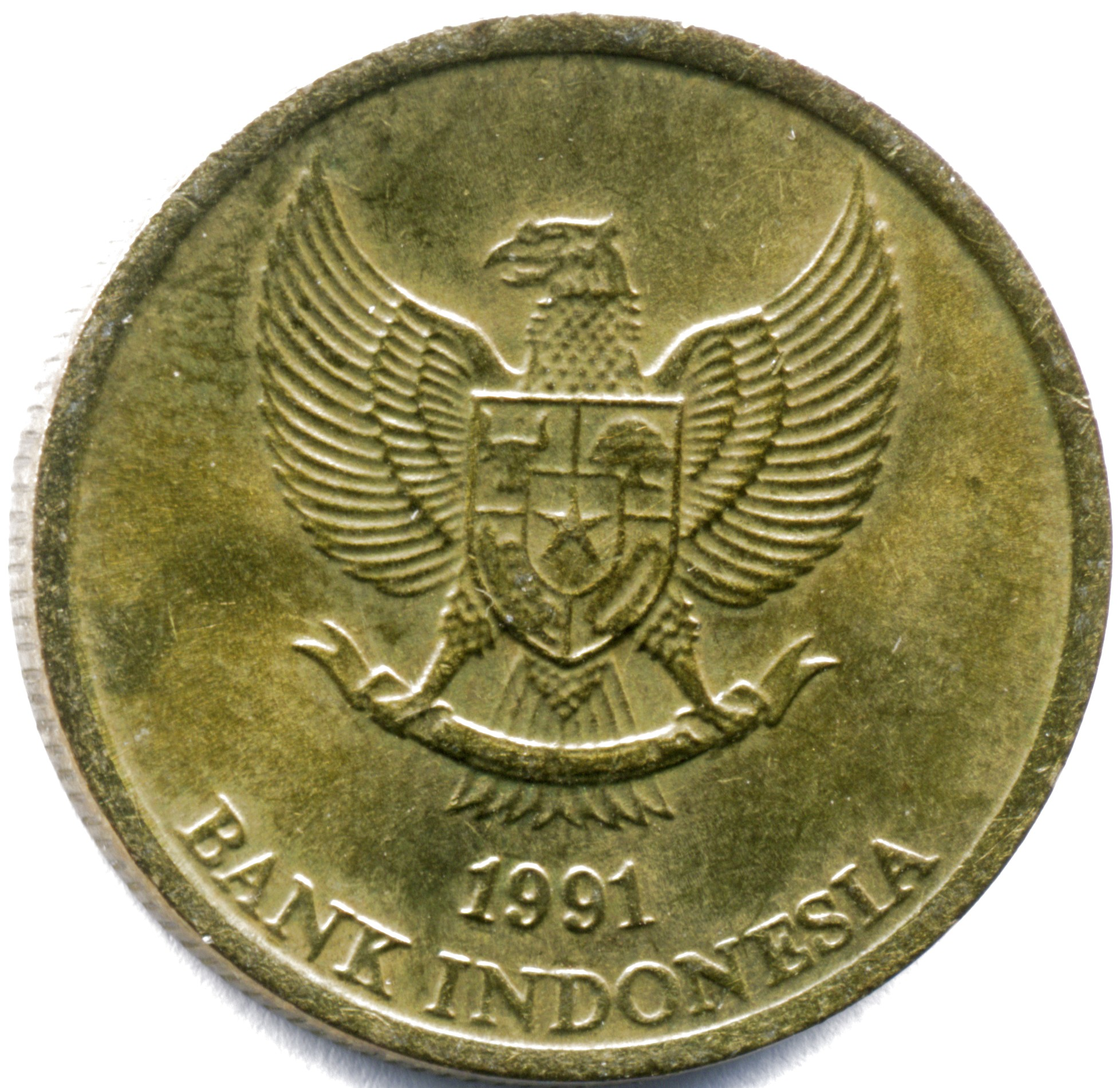
Obverse of 1991 issue

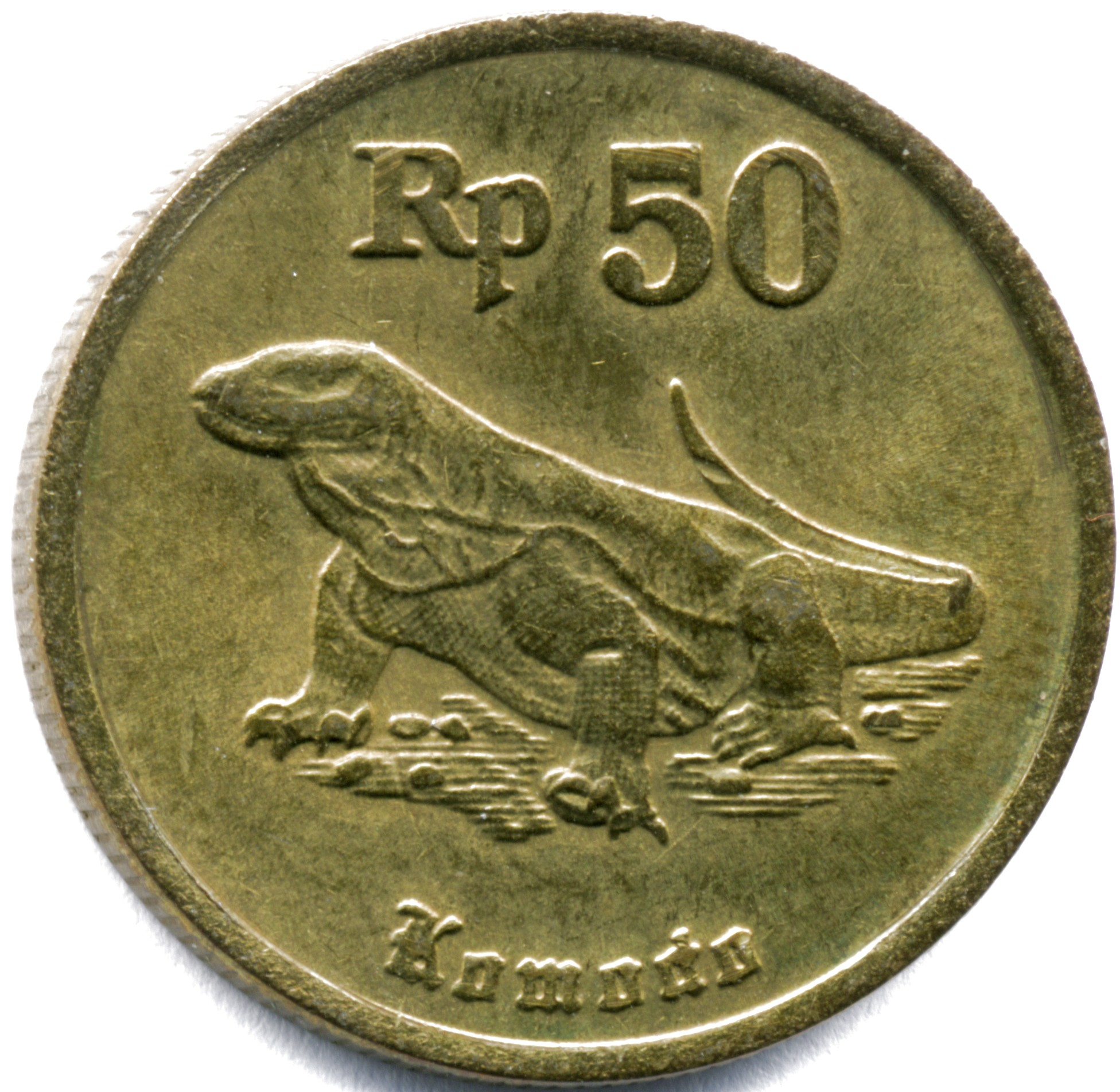
Reverse of 1991 issue

In 1991, the Bank of Indonesia issued an aluminium-bronze Rp50 coin that they minted until 1998. It weighed 3.18 g (0.112 oz), had a 20 mm (0.79 in) diameter, was 1.58 mm (0.062 in) thick, and had a reeded edge. Its obverse featured the national emblem Garuda Pancasila as well as the lettering "BANK INDONESIA" and the year of issue (e.g., "1996") while its reverse featured a portrait of the komodo dragon (Varanus komodoensis) and the lettering "Rp 50" and "Komodo." These coins were demonetised on 30 November 2006, and were redeemable in commercial banks until 29 November 2011 and Bank Indonesia offices until 29 November 2016.

Mintage figures of this coin are as follows:

Year	Amount
1991	67,000,000
1992	70,000,000
1993	120,000,000
1994	300,000,000
1995	591,880,000
1996	Unknown
1997	150,000
1998	150,000

== Third issue (1999-2003) ==
In 1999, the Bank of Indonesia updated the Rp50 coin, with its material changed to aluminum and its reverse now showing a portrait of the black-naped oriole (Oriolus chinensis) as well as the lettering "KEPODANG" and "50 RUPIAH"; its obverse remains the same (depicting the national emblem Garuda Pancasila, mint year (e.g., "2002"), and lettering "BANK INDONESIA"). These coins were minted until 2003, and weighed 1.36 g (0.048 oz), had a 20 mm (0.79 in) diameter, were 2 mm (0.079 in) thick, and had a smooth edge.

== See also ==
- Indonesian rupiah
- Coins of the rupiah
