= Bharatayuddha =

Term for Kurukshetra War

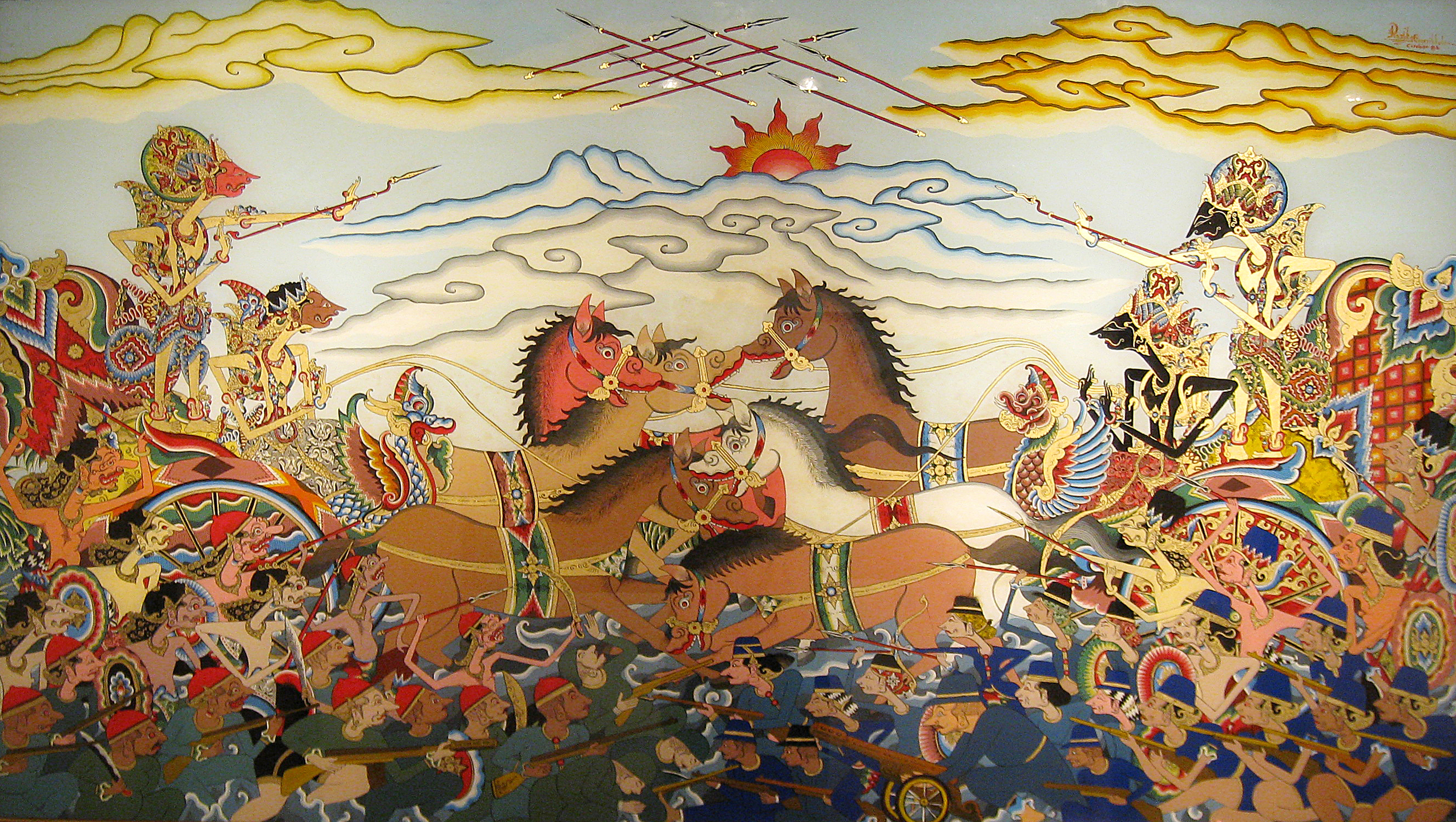
Wayang glass painting depiction of Bhāratayuddha battle

Bharatayuddha (Sanskrit: भारतयुद्ध;, Bhāratayuddha, lit. "Indian War") or Bharat Yudha (or similar) is a term used in Indonesia for the Kurukshetra War, and to describe the Javanese translation and interpretation of the Mahabharata. The Mahabharata was translated into Old Javanese under the reign of king Dharmawangsa of Medang (r. 990-1006). The current version was started by Sedah in 1157, and finished by mpu Panuluh. Mpu Panuluh also wrote the Kakawin Hariwangsa.

According to the Javanese tradition, the war between descendants of emperor Bharata was already destined by the gods long before the Pandavas and Kauravas were born.

== Overview ==
In indonesian version the Kings and Queens were the descendant of Gods. The story begins at Batara Guru, who became the first king of the kingdom of 'Medang Kamulang'. It is often portrayed through the form of Javanese Wayang. A characteristic feature of the Indonesian Mahabharata is that it gives more autonomy to other characters apart from the main characters - Krishna, Arjuna, Bhisma, Duryodhana. In the Indonesian version of Mahabharata more is said about the character of Shalya etc.

The main characters and places are:

1. Bisma (Bhishma - as in Indian Version) Who is the great grandfather of the Pandawas and Kurawas.
2. King Pandu Dewanata (Pandu - In Indian Version) Father of the five Pandawas.
3. Destarata (Dhritrashtra - In Indian Version) Eldest brother of King Pandu Dewanata who is blind and fathers 100 Kurawa brothers.
4. Dewi Kunti (Kunti - In Indian Version) Mother of Yudistira, Bima and Arjuna and wife of Pandu
5. Gendari (Gandhari - In Indian Version) Mother of Kauravas.
6. Madrim (Madri - In Indian Version) Mother of the ashwin twins Nakula and Sadewa and wife of Pandu
7. Karna (Karna - In Indian Version) The son of Kunti and the God Surya himself. He was faithful friend of Duryudana.
8. Durna (Drona - In Indian Version) The great teacher and mahaguru to both the Kurawas and Pandawas. He was the father of Ashwatthama.
9. Duryudana (Duryodhana - In Indian Version) Eldest Kurawa brother who wants to be the king and hates the Pandavas. He was a great warrior and a great friend.
10. Sangkuni (Shakuni - In Indian Version) King of Gandhar, most skilled Player of Dice game, uncle and well wisher of the Kurwas.
11. Arjuna (Arjuna - In Indian Version) Third Pandawa brother born of Indra. He was the greatest Archer of the epic. Arjuna was also the greatest and invincible warrior. Krishna was his best friend. Favourite of Bhisma and Drona.
12. Yudistira (Punta Dewa/Dharmawangsa) (Yudhisthira - In Indian Version) Eldest Pandawa brother, a great king, patient and non violent by nature. Despite Kauravas hated him, he loved them and always wanted end the rivalry.
13. Bima (Bhima - In Indian Version) Second Pandawa brother born of the Wind God, a very strong man with strength of thousands of elephants, a giant.
14. Srikandi (Shikhandi - In Indian Version) elder sister of Draupadi, a warrior princess and a skilled archer, she becomes a man by exchanging her feminity with a yaksha to kill bhisma unfairly as Bhishma denied to use weapons against an enuch Shikhandi.
15. Dropadi (Draupadi - In Indian Version) Younger sister of Srikandi, in Indonesian version, she is married to only Yudisthir after an archery competition won by Bhima for his elder brother; and heroine of the Mahabharata.
16. Hastinapura (Hastinapura - In Indian Version) Original kingdom of Kurus.
17. Amarta (Indraprastha - In Indian Version) New kingdom made by the Pandawas by Maya who was the only creature whom Arjuna spared when he burnt entire Khandava forest.
18. Mt Indrakila: The place where Arjuna goes to meditate before the 'Bharata Yudha' or 'War of India' and where he receives many divine arrows.

== See also ==
- Hinduism in Java
- Javanese Kshatriya
- Kakawin
- Kakawin Bhāratayuddha
