= Arjunawiwaha =

11th century Balinese palm-leaf manuscript

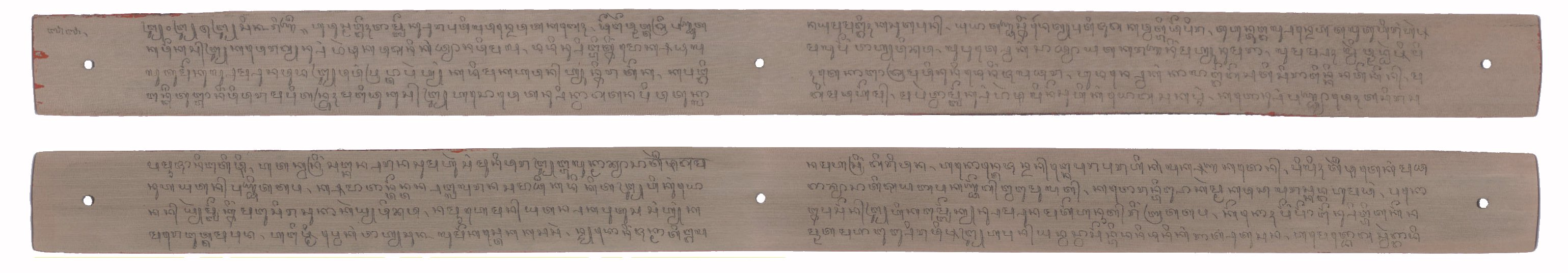
Balinese palm-leaf manuscript of the Arjunawiwāha kakawin.

Arjunawiwāha was the first kakawin to appear in the East Javan period of the Javanese classical Hindu-Buddhist era in the 11th-century. It was composed by Mpu Kanwa during the reign of King Airlangga, king of the Kahuripan Kingdom, circa 1019 to 1042 CE. Arjunawiwaha is estimated to have been finished in 1030.

== The story ==
The kakawin epic tells the story of Arjuna, an excellent archer and the third of the five legendary Pandawa brothers mentioned in the Mahabharata. It is set at the time when the brothers had lost everything to their rivals and cousins, the Korawa. Arjuna aims at regaining his family's fortunes by obtaining a weapon from the gods, and to that effect he practises meditation and asceticism - according to Robson (2001) on Mount Indrakila as a symbol of Mount Meru. At the same time, the demon (asura) Niwatakawaca is disturbing the peace and order of the gods' abode (svargaloka) and can only be defeated by a man. The gods decide to test Arjuna and send him seven apsaras to seduce him and lure him away from his quest. This failing to deter him from his meditation and ascetism, Arjuna is tested anew, this time to determine whether he seeks the welfare of others or only his own deliverance from the world. To this purpose, the god Indra descends to earth disguised as an old Brahmana and discusses religious matters with Arjuna; Arjuna correctly answers Indra's questions, the latter then reveals his true identity and returns to svargaloka. Thus Arjuna passes this second test. He is then given the task of defeating Niwatakawaca. He eventually achieves this too, and receives a reward: seven days in heaven and marriage to each of the seven apsaras in turn. At the end of the text, its author Mpu Kanwa adds that he is about to accompany his king Airlangga into battle.

Along this quest, Arjuna receives weapons - but conflicting sidelines occur with the basic story: some mention only one weapon, others mention several weapons. One of these sidelines tells of the appearance of a boar, that Arjuna shoots; then a hunter comes in who claims to have hit the boar first and therefore it belongs to him. A dispute breaks out until Arjuna realizes that the hunter is Shiva. Shiva then presents Pashupata to Arjuna.
Another version is that Arjuna received the weapon pashupatastra (astra) twice from Shiva: the first time on the Indrakila mountain, where Arjuna also receives weapons from other gods — a club (yama – dandastra or danda), a loop (varuna – pasastra or pasa) and a weapon that gives invisibility (kubera – antardhanastra or antardhana); and a second time, on the 14th day of the Kurukshetra war, Arjuna meets Krishna in a dream and both go to Shiva who leads them to a pond where there are two snakes that turn into a bow and arrow.

The morality in it is about not using the opportunity to obtain the highest benefit for oneself, such as liberation from the world (i.e. the cycle of reincarnations), but choosing to remain in the world in order to seek the welfare of others.

== Its place in history ==
In 1025 the Indian Chola Empire attacked the Srivijaya confederation of kingdoms, centred at Palembang (present South Sumatra) according to archaeological findings. Not only this seriously weakened Srivijaya; it obliterated its scholarly scene, made of famous Buddhist teachers who had attracted students even from India. Their works have been preserved in Tibetan translations. Hundreds of years later, Islam as a new cultural force engendered a written literature in Malay. This historical hiatus is what makes Old Javanese literature quite special for its rarity. No other Indianized countries of Southeast Asia have produced comparable literatures

During the 10th century, the centre of the Javanese kingdom moved from Central Java to the lower valley of the Brantas River in East Java. There it came under severe attack, possibly from Srivijaya; At the time of the Arjunawiwaha writing (assuming that that is between 1028 and 1035), Airlangga has reasserted his position as king in East Java. Srivijaya and Java may have been competitors in the period leading up to this.

== Transformations ==
The Arjunawiwaha is among the texts that survived in Java and was transformed by writers some centuries later. It was written in macapat verse by Susuhunan Pakubuwana III under the title Serat Wiwaha Jarwa or Mintaraga, dated 1778. (Note: Serat Wiwaha Jarwa or Mintaraga, by Susuhunan Pakubuwana III (1778), was published by Johann Friedrich Carl Gericke in 1844.)

It also took the title Serat Wiwaha Jarwa, attributed to Yasadipura I but in fact written by Carel Frederik Winter, Sr. (1799–1859), and published by W. Palmer van den Broek in 1868.

== Translations and studies ==
The first known translation is in Dutch by R. Ng. Poerbatjaraka in 1926; it is deemed to have a few gaps. In 1990, Wiryamartana publishes an Indonesian translation and a lengthy discussion on the transformations of the original text along the centuries, based on manuscripts from Central Java. Henry publishes a partial translation in 1981. Robson publishes a complete translation in 2008.

The Arjunawiwaha is preserved in many manuscripts in Bali. In 1972, Robson published one of the first articles in English discussing how in Bali, Old Javanese texts were still known, read and studied. Among its students was a mabasan (Note: A mabasan is “a socially situated process of translation that has its own rules and its own aesthetic”. sekaha mabasan clubs of modern Bali... are characterized by “extemporaneous glossing” using hermeneutical strategies that do not (primarily) involve analytical means, drawn from a systematic knowledge of morphology and grammar, or try to establish historical derivations and etymologies; they are mainly based on contemporary/popular lexical know-how, “folk etymology”, and associative thinking effected through homology, metaphor, and assonance. These techniques are akin to the Sanskrit nirvacana, which unpack meanings from words rather than reduce them to their bare essentials. — Acri, Andrea; Hunter, Thomas M. (2020). "Translation as Commentary in the Sanskrit-Old Javanese Didactic and Religious Literature from Java and Bali" (PDF). Medieval worlds (11): 213-240 (see p. 214 note 3).) group in the Pura Dalem in Pliatan, led by Ketut Lagas, who at that time worked on reading and interpreting the Arjunawiwaha.
Balinese collections contain hundreds of texts but only a few were regularly mentioned as important: Ramayana, Arjunawiwaha, Bharatayuddha, Bhomantaka and Sutasoma. These were deemed to convey edifying teachings; but this may be due to that the effort to preserve and define the Balinese spiritual heritage was led by the very active Parisadha Hindu Dharma movement, that produced books intended for study and containing moralistic texts or guides for worship; and he Old Javanese classics provide a base for the Hindu society of Bali, legitimized by its high antiquity and having the authority of Scripture.

== Its place in religion ==
These texts' Scriptural authority reaches the religious rituals. As such, the “hymn to Siwa”, a passage from the Arjunawiwaha (10-11) that is also quoted in the Parisadha Hindu Dharma books, is part of a temple ritual. It starts with the words: “Om sěmbahning anātha tinghalana de trilokaśaraņa” (“Hail! May the homage of the protectorless be seen by the refuge of the three worlds.”).

Bas-reliefs depicting the Arjunawiwaha were carved on East Javanese candis (temples), such as Candi Kedaton in Probolinggo Regency, Candi Surawana near Kediri, Candi Jago near Malang; and in Bali on Rambut Siwi in Mendoyo district, Jembrana Regency.

== See also ==
- Kakawin Bhāratayuddha
- Kakawin Hariwangsa
- Kakawin Ramayana
- Kakawin Sutasoma
- Nagarakretagama
- Pararaton
- Śiwarātrikalpa
- Smaradahana

== Bibliography ==
- Robson, Stuart (2001). "On Translating the Arjunawiwāha". Bijdragen tot de Taal-, Land- en Volkenkunde. 157 (1): 35–50. doi:10.1163/22134379-90003817. JSTOR 27865696.
- Robson, Stuart (2008). Arjunawiwāha. The marriage of Arjuna of Mpu Kanwa (PDF). Bibliotheca Indonesica, 34. Leiden / Boston: KITLV Press. ISBN 9789004253940.
- Varela, Miguel Escobar (2014). Wayang Kontemporer: Innovations in Javanese Wayang (PDF) (phD thesis in Philosophy, supervisor: Yong Li Lan). National University of Singapore.
