= Kakawin =

Long narrative poems composed in Old Javanese

Kakawin are long narrative poems composed in Old Javanese, also called "Kawi", written in verse form with rhythms and meters derived from Sanskrit literature. Poets used a formalized literary language, rather than the vernacular. Poets composed and performed the poems at the courts of central and east Java kings between the 9th and 16th centuries, and in Bali.

Although the poems depict events and characters from Hindu mythology, the narratives are set in the local landscapes of the islands. They are rich sources of information about courtly society in Java and Bali.

== Structure ==
A kakawin stanza consists of four lines. Each line has a set number of syllables per line, set in patterns of long and short syllables based on Sanskrit rules of prosody. A syllable which contains a long vowel is called guru (Sanskrit for "heavy"), while a syllable which contains a short one is called laghu (Sanskrit for "light"). The term guru laghu denotes the structure of a line.

For example, each line of the kakawin metre called "Śardūlawikrīd[?]ita" consists of 19 syllables. The guru laghu of each line is as follows" ---|UU-|U-U|UU-|--U|--U| U. The notation "-" means that the syllable in question is long, while the "U" means that the syllable is short.

As an example, the opening stanza of the Kakawin Arjunawiwaha, which is in the metre Śardūlawikrīd[?]ita, is taken:

ambĕk sang paramārthapaṇḍita huwus limpad sakêng śūnyatā
tan sangkêng wiṣaya prayojñananira lwir sanggrahêng lokika
siddhāning yaśawīrya donira sukhāning rāt kininkinira
santoṣâhĕlĕtan kĕlir sira sakêng sang hyang Jagatkāraṇa

A tentative translation in English:
The thought of the one who knows the Highest Knowledge has leapt from the emptiness.
It is not because he wishes to fulfill his senses, as if he only wants to have the worldly things.
The success of his virtuous and good deeds are his goals. He endeavors for the happiness the world.
He is steadfast and just a wayang screen away from the "Mover of the World".

A syllable which contains a long vowel is automatically long (ā, ī, ū, ö, e, o, ai, and au) and thus guru. But on the other hand, a syllable with a vowel followed by two consonants is also long. In addition to that the last syllable of a line may both contain a long or a short syllable. It is an anceps.

== List of notable kakawin ==
- Kakawin Adiparwa
- Kakawin Arjunawijaya, by Mpu Tantular
- Kakawin Arjunawiwaha, by mpu Kanwa, c. 1030
- Kakawin Banawa Sekar Tanakung
- Kakawin Bharatayuddha, by Mpu Sedah and Mpu Panuluh, 1157
- Kakawin Bhomakawya
- Kakawin Bhomantaka
- Kakawin Brahmandapurana
- Kakawin Dharmaśunya
- Kakawin Gatotkacaśraya
- Kakawin Hariwangsa
- Kakawin Hariśraya
- Kakawin Kalayawanantaka
- Kakawin Khandawawanadahana
- Kakawin Kṛsnataka
- Kakawin Krsnayana
- Kakawin Kunjarakarna, by Mpu Dusun
- Kakawin Nagarakṛtâgama/Kakawin Desawarnana, by Mpu Prapanca, 1365
- Kakawin Nirarthaprakṛta
- Kakawin Nitiśastra
- Kakawin Parthayajña
- Kakawin Ramayana c. 870
- Kakawin Śivagŗha, 856
- Kakawin Siwaratrikalpa by Mpu Tanakung
- Kakawin Smaradhana
- Kakawin Subhrawiwaha
- Kakawin Sumanasantaka by Mpu Monaguṇa
- Kakawin Sutasoma, by Mpu Tantular
- Kakawin Wrtasañcaya by Mpu Tanakung
- Kakawin Wṛttayana

== See also ==
- Bhinneka Tunggal Ika
- Javanese historical texts
- Javanese poetry
- Nagarakretagama
- Panji tales
- Pararaton
