= Sri Tanjung =

Javanese folktale

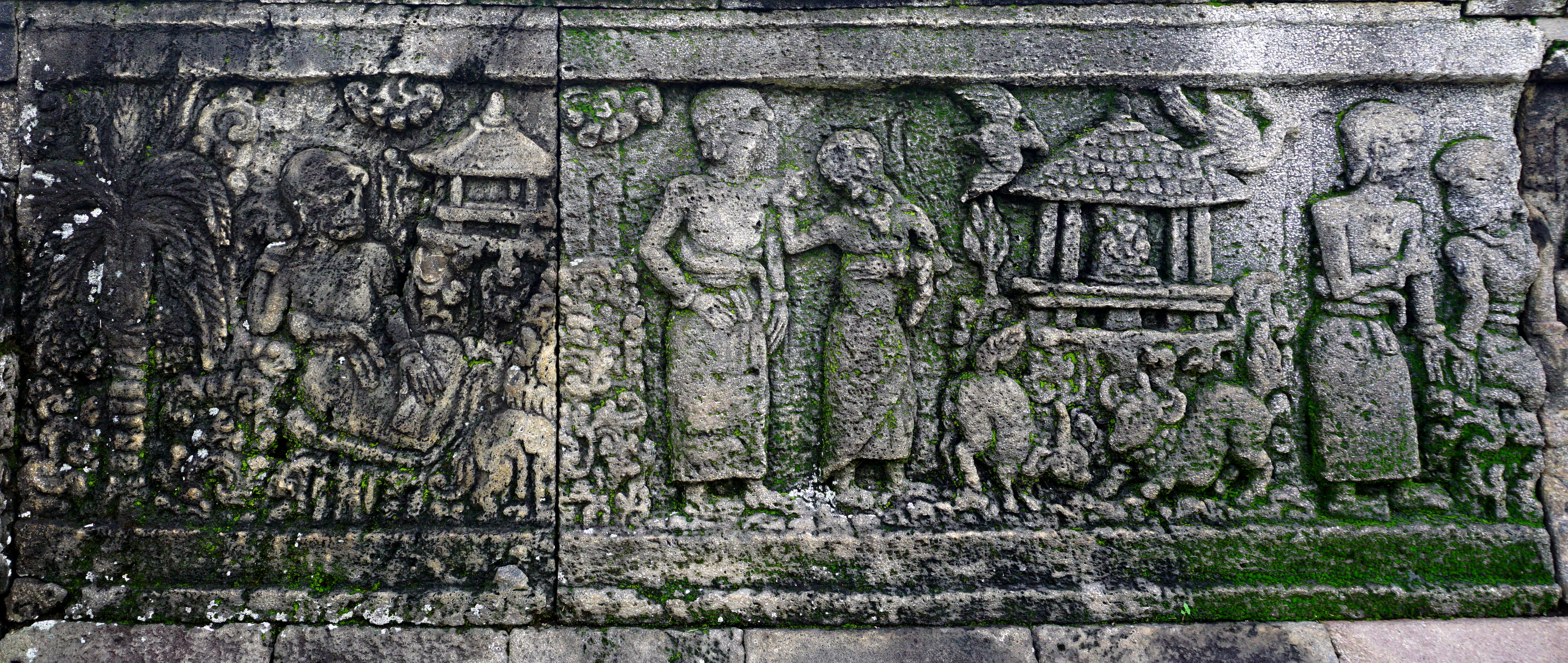
A basrelief of Sri Tanjung tales in Penataran temple depicting Raden Sidapaksa and Sri Tanjung

Sri Tanjung, also known as the tale of Banyuwangi (Javanese for "fragrant water"), is a Javanese folktale about a faithful wife who was wrongfully accused. The story has been popular since the era of the Majapahit kingdom. The story is usually performed as kidung, a poem sung or chanted in Javanese tembang. The Kidung Sri Tanjung are performed in the traditional Javanese ruwatan, an exorcism ceremony. The name Sri Tanjung is linked to the Tanjung flower (Mimusops elengi), a flower with a sweet fragrance.

== Origin ==
Like many other Indonesian folk stories, the author of this tale is unknown; however, it is suggested that the story originated from Banyuwangi, East Java since it is connected to the legend about the origin of the name "Banyuwangi." The story originated from the early Majapahit period around the 13th century. The story of Sri Tanjung can be found on the bas-reliefs of the temples at Penataran, Bajang Ratu, Candi Surawana, and Jabung.

== Summary ==
Once upon a time, there was a handsome and powerful Kshatriya (knight) named Raden Sidapaksa, a descendant of the Pandavas. The knight served under King Sulakrama, the ruler of Sindurejo kingdom. Sidapaksa was sent to search for medicine for the king's grandfather, the hermit Bhagawan Tamba Petra who lived secluded in his hermitage on the mountains. Here Sidapaksa met Sri Tanjung, a girl of extraordinary beauty. Sri Tanjung was not an ordinary girl, since her mother was a vidhyadari (apsara) who descended to earth and married a mortal man. Raden Sidapaksa fell in love and asked Sri Tanjung for her hand in marriage. The happy couple went home, back to the kingdom of Sindurejo to settle down. King Sulakrama secretly fell in love, smitten and infatuated by the beauty of Sri Tanjung. The king desired Sri Tanjung for himself and set an evil plot to separate the newlywed couple.

King Sulakrama ordered Sidapaksa to go to Svargaloka to send a message to the gods. He is ordered to hand the gods a letter written: "The bearer of this letter will attack the Svargaloka". Sri Tanjung lent her magic sash to her husband, a family heirloom received from her father Raden Sudamala. The magic sash was an enchanted garment belonging to her mother, the apsara, enabling her to travel from earth to heaven. Sidapaksa arrived at Svargaloka, not knowing about the message in the unopened letter, and handed the letter to the gods. Of course, the gods were furious and attacked the unsuspecting Sidapaksa. Sidapaksa pleaded for an explanation and explained himself as a descendant of Pandava. The gods learned about the misunderstanding and freed Sidapaksa. As compensation for their mistake, the gods bestowed on Sidapaksa the blessing of a magic weapon.

Meanwhile, on Earth after Sidapaksa left for heaven, King Sulakrama made an advance on Sri Tanjung and tried to seduce her. Sri Tanjung refused the king's advances and tried to escape. However, the king chased and forced Sri Tanjung, holding her against her will and trying to rape her. Sidapaksa came home in time to find his wife held in the king's arms. The evil king told a lie, accusing Sri Tanjung of being a lustful unfaithful woman who tried to seduce him. Sidapaksa fell for the king's lies and in jealousy tried to kill her. Sri Tanjung cried and swore her innocence, pleading for her husband to believe in her. In desperation she swore, with god as her witness, that if she was truly innocent, her body would not spill blood, but instead fragrant liquid. Blinded by anger and jealousy, Sidapaksa fiercely stabbed Sri Tanjung with a kris. Sri Tanjung fell and died, but a miracle happened: just like her words, her spilled blood was a sweet fragrance perfume, a testament to her innocence.

Raden Sidapaksa realized his terrible mistake and fell into regret and despair. Meanwhile, the spirit of Sri Tanjung ascended to heaven and met the goddess Durga. After learning about the injustice done to Sri Tanjung, the great goddess revived Sri Tanjung and reunited her with her husband. The gods ordered Sidapaksa to take revenge and punish the evil deed of King Sulakrama. Sidapaksa succeeded in defeating and killing King Sulakrama in a battle. It was said that the fragrant water, the perfumed blood of Sri Tanjung, became the origin of the name Banyuwangi or "fragrant water", the capital of the Blambangan kingdom.

== See also ==
- Hinduism in Java
- Javanese Kshatriya
- Javanese literature
- Sri Tanjung
