= Yasadipura I =

Surakarta Sunanate poet (1729–1802)

Raden Ngabehi Yasadipura I
- Born: Bagus Banjar; 1729
- Died: 1802 (72–73)
- Burial place: Pengging Burial Complex, Ngaliyan, Boyolali Regency, Central Java
- Other name: Raden Ngabei Yasadipura Tus Pajang
- Known for: Poet
- Children: Yasadipura II
- Parents: Raden Tumenggung Padmanagara (father); Nyai Ajêng Padmanagara (mother)

Raden Ngabei Yasadipura Tus Pajang, better known as Yasadipura I (1729–1802), was a poet from the Surakarta Sunanate in present-day Java. Yasadipura I is considered to be the greatest of poets living in Java Island during the 18th century.

== Biography ==
Yasadipura was born "Bagus Banjar". His father was Tumenggung Padmanegara, the regent of Pekalongan. His father was a descendant of Sultan Hadiwijaya, the King of Pajang. Yasadipura I studied with Kyai Honggomoyo, a scholar from the Magelang hermitage.

Returned from Palembang, Raden Tumenggung Padmanagara was accepted as a public servant during the reign of Pakubuwana I. He was assigned to Pengging, granted 50 jung of land. There, he married a beautiful girl, Maryam, daughter of Kalipah Caripu, a local cleric. She was then styled Nyi Ajêng Padmanagara and gave birth to their first child, a daughter (the future Mas Ajêng Jakariya). Unsatisfied, he prayed for a son. The birth of Bagus Banjar was the answer.

During the reign of Pakubuwana IV, he was intended to be appointed patih dalem; however, Yasadipura I refused due to his advanced age. As compensation, later, three of his sons were appointed at the rank of bupati; they were :

1. Raden Tumenggung Sastranagara (Yasadipura II)
2. Raden Tumenggung Yasadipura III
3. Raden Tumenggung Amongpraja

His notable works were composed in the form of macapat poetry in the new Javanese language. Some of his verses are still often uttered as suluk by the puppeteers in wayang performances to this day.

Yasadipura I's works also included tales with mystical and Islamic themes often derived from Malay texts. One such work is Serat Ambiya, which was a Javanese adaptation of the Stories of the Prophets. Another work is Serat Menak, an adaptation of Hikayat Amir Hamzah in Malay. This story tells of the heroism of Hamza ibn Abdul-Muttalib, the uncle of the Prophet Muhammad.

== Death ==
Yasadipura I died in 1802, which was also the birth year of his great-grandson, Ranggawarsita. Later, Ranggawarsita inherited the legacy of Yasadipuran from his grandfather, Yasadipura II.

Yasadipura I is buried in the Pengging area, about 15 km west of Surakarta.

== Notable works ==
- Serat Rama, adapted from Kakawin Ramayana
- Serat Bratayuda, adapted from Kakawin Bharatayuddha
- Fiber Mintaraga, adaptation of Kakawin Arjuna Wiwaha
- Serat Arjuna Sasrabahu, adapted from Kakawin Arjuna Wijaya

== Ancestry ==
Ancestors of Yasadipura I

Pangeran Adipati Wiramanggala
Kanjeng Pangeran Arya Danupaya
Raden Tumenggung Arya Padmanagara
Raden Ngabehi Yasadipura I
Kyai Kalipah Caripu
Nyai Ajêng Padmanagara

== Bibliography ==
- Andjar Any. 1980. Raden Ngabehi Ranggawarsita. What Happened Ranggawarsita? Semarang: Various Sciences
- M.C. Ricklefs. 1991. History of Modern Indonesia (trans.). Yogyakarta: Gadjah Mada University Press

Media related to Yasadipura I at Wikimedia Commons
