= Uhlenbeck =

Uhlenbeck is a surname. Notable people with the surname include:

- Christianus Cornelis Uhlenbeck (1866–1951), linguist and lecturer at the University of Leiden
- Eugenius Uhlenbeck (1913-2003), linguist at Leiden University
- George Uhlenbeck (1900–1988), Dutch-American physicist
- Karen Uhlenbeck (born 1942), American mathematician
