= Nila Tanzil =

Indonesian activist (born 1976)

- Nila Tanzil at Curtin University 2026
- Born: Nila Tanzil; April 29, 1976 (age 50); Jakarta, Indonesia
- Known for: Founder of "Taman Bacaan Pelangi"

Nila Tanzil (born in Jakarta, April 29, 1976) is the founder of Taman Bacaan Pelangi a non-profit organization focused on promoting literacy in remote areas of eastern Indonesia. Nila holds a master's degree (MA in European Communication Studies) from the University of Amsterdam, in The Netherlands and a bachelor's in International Relations from Parahyangan Catholic University where she was named "Best Graduate of The Year".

== Family and Education ==
Nila Tanzil's paternal grandfather is Tan Khoen Swie as founder of Boekhandel Tan Khoen Swie, they published books in Malay, and Javanese during the early to mid 20th Century.

Tanzil completed her Bachelor of International Relations at Universitas Katolik Parahyangan, Bandung on the Indonesian Island of West Java. She then followed this with a Master of Arts in European Communication Studies from the University of Amsterdam, The Netherlands.

In December 2021 Tanzil received an Australia Awards Scholarship. She commenced studying in July 2022 at Curtin University, as of October 2026 Tanzil is completing a PhD in Education at Curtin University, Australia.

== Taman Bacaan Pelangi ==
Taman Bacaan Pelangi is a non-profit organization that builds children's libraries and promotes literacy in remote areas of eastern Indonesia. Nila opened the first Taman Bacaan Pelangi children's library in Roe Village, Flores, East Nusa Tenggara, Indonesia in 2009. As of October 2026, Pelangi had 260 libraries across 18 islands in eastern Indonesia, including libraries on East Nusa Tenggara, West Nusa Tenggara, South Sulawesi, Papua providing more than 280,000 children's books to some of the most remote villages in Indonesia. Nila inaugurated her 100th library 14 September 2018, and delivered her 250,000th children's book in September 2018. Taman Bacaan Pelangi focuses the eastern part of Indonesia because it is underdeveloped and lacks the infrastructure needed to give children access to international-standard books. More importantly, the illiteracy rate in parts of eastern Indonesia is staggeringly high, with more than 55 percent of 15-year-olds unable to understand what they read. In an effort to ensure that Taman Bacaan Pelangi is well-funded and sustainable, she founded Travel Sparks in 2015.

Travel Sparks is a social enterprise that helps people from around the world "Travel With A Cause". With Travel Sparks, tourists can take part in a once in a lifetime voluntourism opportunity. In 2016, Nila published "Lembar-Lembar Pelangi," a non-fiction book that recounts her decision to quit her corporate career and answer the "call" to leave it all behind her to follow her dream of building libraries and promoting literacy in some of the most remote places in Indonesia.

== Awards ==
- Kartini Next Generation
- 10 EY Entrepreneur of The Year 2016 from Ernst & Young
- 10 Inspiring Women 2015 by Forbes Indonesia
- Inspiring Woman in ICT for Community Development from the Ministry of Women Empowerment & Child Protection and the Ministry of Communication & IT
- Nugra Jasadharma Pustaloka 2013 from the National Library of the Republic of Indonesia
- Indonesia's Inspiring Youth & Women 2012 from Indosat
- 10 Iconic Women Indonesia
- GlobeAsia 's 99 inspiring Women 2019
- 2020 People and Inspiration award.
- 2023 Influential Women Award

== Fellowships ==
- Nila is an inaugural fellow of the Equity Initiative Fellowship in 2016 and an Atlantic Fellow.
- She is also an Eisenhower Fellow 2018.
