= Javanese literature =

Javanese literature is, generally speaking, literature from Java and, more specifically, from areas where Javanese is spoken. However, similar to other literary traditions, Javanese language works were and not necessarily produced only in Java, but also in Sunda, Madura, Bali, Lombok, Southern Sumatra (especially around Palembang) and Suriname. This article only deals with Javanese written literature and not with oral literature and Javanese theatre such as wayang.

== Overview ==
The Javanese language is an Austronesian language and heavily influenced principally by Sanskrit in its earliest written stage. Later on it has undergone additional influences from mainly Arabic, Dutch, and Malay/Indonesian. Beginning in the 9th century, texts in Javanese language using a Brahmic derived script were written. The oldest written text in Javanese is the so-called Inscription of Sukabumi which is dated March 25, 804. Although this is not a piece of literature, this inscription is often mentioned as the starting point of Javanese literature.

The Dutch scholar Theodore Pigeaud divides the history of Javanese literature in four major periods:

=== Pre-Islamic period ===
The first era is a pre-Islamic period of about six centuries, beginning about 900 AD, up to about 1500 AD: the traditional date of the victory of Islam over pre-Islamic belief in the East Javanese kingdom of Majapahit. Javanese texts indubitably written in the pre-Islamic period have been preserved for posterity mainly in eighteenth and nineteenth century Balinese manuscripts. The idiom is called Old Javanese. In Java the original Javanese tradition of literature was interrupted and all but cut off by the rise of Islam.

There is a relatively rich body of pre-Islamic Javanese literature (see List of Old Javanese literary works). Among Old Javanese texts, a chronological distinction can be made between works of authors living in the period of suzerainty of the Kadiri Kings (up to about 1200 AD) and their predecessors, on the one side, and books written in the subsequent Singosari Majapahit period on the other. Almost all Old Javanese texts were written in East Java, mainly in districts situated in the basin of the river Brantas. The few exceptions are some very old texts probably written in the tenth century in Central Java in the district of Mataram, in the basin of the rivers Opak and Praga. In addition, for some texts, it is doubtful whether a given text in the Old Javanese language was written in Java or in Bali.

In the pre-Islamic period Indian culture was a most important factor in the development of Javanese literature. During some centuries, perhaps up to the twelfth century, Indian literary influence was dominant in all respects. Afterwards indigenous Javanese concepts came gradually to the fore. In the fourteenth and fifteenth centuries Javanese authors wrote some books containing ideas and mythic speculations which seem pre-eminently autochthonous Javanese. At that time an amalgamation of imported elements of Indian culture and native Javanese concepts was effected in literature.

=== Javano-Balinese period ===
The second era of the chronological scheme is a Javano-Balinese period of about fourteenth centuries, beginning about 1500 AD and lasting up to the present time. Javano-Balinese literature is written in the Javano-Balinese literary idiom. Since the thirteenth century, or even earlier, the island of Bali seems to have been brought gradually within the sphere of influence of East Javanese Kings, and in the fourteenth century the dynasty of Majapahit ruled the country. According to Javanese historical tradition, about 1500 AD the last Majapahit King, ousted from his Royal residence by Muslim insurgents, fled eastwards and found a refuge in Bali. There may be some truth in this tradition. Anyway, the Balinese rulers did not embrace Islam, and in Bali Old Javanese literature was preserved and cherished. In the course of time at the Courts of the sixteenth and seventeenth century South Balinese

Kings of Gèlgèl of Klungkung, Old Javanese letters developed into a Javano-Balinese literature with characteristic features of its own. Indigenous Balinese mythical and historical traditions were introduced, and a new style of prosody, well suited to the structure of the Balinese and Javanese languages, was cultivated.

Side by side with Javano-Balinese literature, and stimulated by it, a purely Balinese literature developed. Before the period of Javanese cultural and political domination in Bali, since the thirteenth century, an Old Balinese literary idiom had been in use at the Courts of native Balinese rulers. Like Old Javanese, Old Balinese had developed under the influence of Indian culture. After an interval of about five centuries, the period of Javanese domination, the native Balinese language was used again as a medium of literary activity. Probably this was in the seventeenth or the eighteenth century. Balinese language and literature of the second flourishing period, which endures up to the present time, are strongly influenced by Old Javanese and Javano-Balinese. In some cases it is difficult to decide whether a given text should be registered as belonging to Javano-Balinese or to Balinese literature.

It is very difficult to establish any kind of chronological order in the mass of Javano-Balinese literature, because scarcely any text is dated. In some cases older texts belonging to the Gèlgèl period can be distinguished from younger texts belonging to the subsequent eighteenth and nineteenth century Klungkung reigns by the growing prominence of Balinese forms and vocabulary in the latter texts.

Javano-Balinese literature developed out of Old Javanese letters and Balinese tradition. No foreign influence was in evidence except Islam. Though the ruling classes of Bali, the Courts and the clergy, adhered to ancestral religious concepts and ritual, somehow Javanese Islamic literature penetrated into mercantile middle-class communities in the country, and a small Muslim Javano-Balinese literature developed. Its exact chronology is unknown, but its relationship with seventeenth and eighteenth century Javanese Pasisir literature or the following era is indubitable.

=== Islamic era or Javanese Pesisir literature ===
The third era of the chronological scheme introduced in the present Synopsis is the era of Javanese Pesisir literature of about three centuries, beginning about 1500 AD. So it coincides with the first half of the era of Javano-Balinese literature. Texts belonging to the era of the scheme were written in the literary idioms of East Java, Madura and the North Coast districts. Pesisir is a Javanese word meaning 'coast' or 'costal line'.

In the fifteenth and sixteenth centuries, Islam was in the ascendant in Java. Political power devolved from the inland Court of Majapahit to Muslim dynasts ruling in various maritime districts and trading centers on the North Coast. In these districts, from Surabaya and Gresik in the east up to Cirebon and Banten in the west, a rejuvenated Javanese literature developed under the influence of Islam.

In the period of Pesisir culture authors were very active in writing books on all subjects belonging to the sphere of Muslim Javanese civilization. Far from ignoring pre-Islamic literature, however, they assimilated many elements of Old Javanese culture. The result was an amalgam of Muslim and pre-Islamic culture, in several respects showing survivals of ancient indigenous Javanese concepts.

The three centres of Pesisir literature in Java were Surabaya (with Gresik), Demak (with Japara) and Cérbon (with Banten). East Javanese Pesisir texts came first, for in East Java Muslim religious influence first became an important element in civilization. Starting from Java, Islamic Pesisir culture spread to some other islands of which the coasts are washed by the Java sea. The most important outlying cultural provinces were Lombok and Palémbang. In the island of Lombok a remarkable Islamic Javano-Balinese literature came into existence. The texts contain reminiscences of indigenous Sasak culture. The native Sasak language developed into a medium of literary activity side by side with the Javano-Balinese idiom.

Probably for centuries, even in the pre-Islamic period, the district of Palémbang in South Sumatra was ruled by dynasts of Javanese extraction. In the seventeenth and eighteenth centuries Javanese Pesisir literature was cultivated at Court. In the nineteenth century Javanese cultural influence in Palémbang declined in consequence of the fall of the dynasty. Malay took the place of Javanese.

The important oversea expansions of Javanese Pesisir literature, both eastwards and westwards, started from East Java. Minor expansions, of Javanese Pesisir culture took their course from Banten and from Central Javanese maritime towns. The districts affected by them, Lampung in South Sumatra by Banten, and Bañjar Masin in Borneo by Central Java, did not produce Javanese literary texts of any importance, however.

In, Javanese Pesisir literature, the influence of Islamic culture was strong. Islam first reached Java by the intermediary of Malay literature, Malay being the medium of the interinsular commerce which brought Muslim traders from India to the Archipelago. Asa result, Pesisir literature contains borrowings, from Malay and from Arabic, the sacred language of Islam, but also, from other continental languages, in the first place Persian, which was the universal Islamic medium in India in the fifteenth and sixteenth centuries.

=== Renaissance of classical literature ===
The fourth era of the chronological scheme is the period of the renaissance of classical Javanese literature in the eighteenth and nineteenth centuries. Literature belonging to this era was written in the Surakarta and Yogyakarta idioms. The cultural centre was the Court of the inland Central Javanese Kings in Kartasura, Surakarta and Yogyakarta. The fame of the Surakarta authors, called pujanggas, spread all over Java, and their style was much imitated. In consequence in the nineteenth century Surakarta renaissance literature was considered as the Javanese literature par excellence, and works of authors belonging to the preceding Pasisir era fell into oblivion or were disregarded. The Surakarta Court idiom with its rigid rules of class distinction in vocabulary (the so-called manners of speech, krama and ngoko etc.) was accepted almost everywhere as exemplary. Probably in the seventeenth and the beginning of the eighteenth century Pasisir literature was already on the decline in consequence of economic and political retrogression in the mercantile towns on the North Coast where the authors and their patrons lived. One by one the maritime districts were vanquished by the forces of the despotic Kings of inland Mataram. Their over-sea trade, the source of their prosperity, receded as a result of the rise of Batavia.

The Central Javanese, renaissance culture of the nineteenth century was the successor of seventeenth and eighteenth century Pasisir civilization, which in its time formed a cultural link between maritime districts along the coasts of Java, Madura, Bali and Lombok. The differences between the two are geographical and ideological. Geographically, seventeenth and eighteenth century Javanese Pasisir culture was interinsular. But then it was mainly confined to the maritime districts of the islands. It was not in all respects unified, using different languages and idioms. Nineteenth-century Central Javanese pujangga culture, on the other hand, was national Javanese. Belonging to the interior of the country, and using the mannered Court idiom of Surakarta and Yogyakarta, it was unified to a high degree.

Ideologically the difference between Pasisir and pujangga literature consists in their origin and development. In the Pasisir literature of the seventeenth and eighteenth century, on the one hand, the principal concern was religion. It superseded the culture of the preceding non-Islamic period, in the meantime retaining several features of pre-Islamic civilization. Its origin was middle-class. In the Central Javanese civilization of the nineteenth century, on the other hand, Muslim religion was taken for granted. The pujanggas were mostly interested in the remains of pre-Islamic belletristic literature. Their books were meant to be reading-matter for gentlemen.

Eighteenth and nineteenth century renaissance authors were masters in adapting the products of former periods of literature, as far as known to them. Some Old Javanese epic kakawins were turned into modern Javanese poems. Historical, romantic and theatrical literature flourished. The wayang theatre became the favourite pastime at Court, and plays were composed by Kings and princes,. Originating from the interior of the country, Surakarta renaissance literature lacked stimulating contacts with foreign cultures oversea, like its predecessor in Central Java, Pasisir literature, had. Neither international Islam nor interinsular Malay literature were appreciated at Court. Javano-Balinese letters, which in the eighteenth century were flourishing in Bali, were unknown in Central Java.

Eighteenth and nineteenth century renaissance literature was heavily indebted to eighteenth century Pasisir literature, especially of the Central and East Javanese maritime districts. After a long period of dynastic troubles and internal wars, which were detrimental to the mercantile towns on the seacoast, peace was finally restored in Central and East Java in the middle of the eighteenth century. Probably since that time traffic by prao on the river Bengawan was instrumental in establishing contacts between Surakarta and Gresik, the ancient centre of the decaying East Javanese Pasisir culture. It is a fact that the Surakarta scholars' knowledge of the admired Old Javanese kakawins was second-hand. Manuscripts written in Pasisir districts were intermediaries. The superior Balinese codices of Old Javanese texts were not available in Central Java.

In the nineteenth century Surakarta authors were stimulated by the presence of three European scholars: Winter, Gericke and Wilkens, who were studying Javanese language and literature in Central Java. Through their intermediary some knowledge of European culture spread at Court. The Bible was translated into Javanese.

The second half of the nineteenth century and the first decades of the twentieth century were the period of development of Surakarta renaissance letters into a common Javanese belletristic literature characterized by its predilection for the wayang theatre and wayang plays. In consequence of the maintenance of peace and order in the interior of the country and an unprecedented increase of traffic by means of the railways, Surakarta (and, in a minor degree, also Yogyakarta) Court culture developed into a common spiritual sphere of the priyayi class, the gentlefolk of Java. Probably never before the nineteenth century such a sense of cultural unity was prevalent among the members of the well-educated classes in the interior of the country. Henceforth the Court culture radiating from Surakarta and Yogyakarta was considered by educated people as the only genuine Javanese civilization.

Notwithstanding the early nineteenth century contacts of Surakarta authors with Dutch scholars, the modern European novel and short story did not begin to develop in Javanese literature before the second or third decade of the twentieth century. Apparently for a long time the appeal of the well-known phantastic wayang play literature was stronger than the interest in new fiction dealing with problems of modern times.

In all periods of history conservatism and a tendency to retrospection and mythography have been characteristic features of Javanese literature. Its endurance for many centuries, adapting elements of foreign cultures, Indian and Islamic, but not superseded by them, is, remarkable. Apparently cultural conservatism upheld Javanese authors and scholars in the critical periods when foreign ideologies were introduced into their national society. It remains to be seen whether in times to come Javanese conservatism will prove strong enough to adapt and integrate foreign elements with the same success as it did in the past.

Anyway, Javanese cultural conservatism seems a valuable asset in the amalgam of modern Indonesian civilization which is developing in the twentieth century. The present Synopsis of Javanese literature up to about 1900 is not the place to discuss modern developments at any length, however.

== See also ==
- Indonesian Esoteric Buddhism
- Hinduism in Java
- Sanghyang Kamahayanikan
- Sanghyang Siksa Kandang Karesian
- Kunjarakarna Dharmakathana
- Sumanasantaka
- Bhomantaka

== Bibliography ==
- (in Dutch) Cornelis Christiaan Berg, 1928, Kidung Sundayana : (Kidung Sunda C) : voor schoolgebruik uitgegeven, en voorzien van aanteekeningen, een woordenlijstje en een inleiding tot de studie van het Oud-Javaansch. Soerakarta: De Bliksem.
- (in English) George Quinn, 1992, The novel in Javanese : aspects of its social and literary character. Leiden: KITLV Press. ISBN 90-6718-033-5
- (in English) The. Pigeaud, 1967-1970 Literature of Java :Catalogue raisonne of Javanese : Catalogue raisonne of Javanese manuscripts in the library of the University of Leiden and other public collections in the Netherlands The Hague : Martinus Nijhoff.
- (in Javanese) Raden Mas Ngabehi Poerbatjaraka, 1952, Kapustakan Djawi. Djakarta: Djambatan
- (in Indonesian) Raden Mas Ngabehi Poerbatjaraka & Tardjan Hadidjaja, 1952, Kapustakan Djawi. Djakarta: Djambatan
- (in English) J.J. Ras, 1979, Javanese literature since independence. An anthology. The Hague: Uitgeverij Nijhoff, VKI 88, ISBN 90-247-2309-4
- (in English) P.J. Zoetmulder, 1974, Kalangwan. A Survey of Old Javanese Literature. The Hague: Martinus Nijhoff. ISBN 90-247-1674-8
