= Surawana =

Hindu temple in Indonesia

Coordinates: 7°44′46″S 112°13′05″E

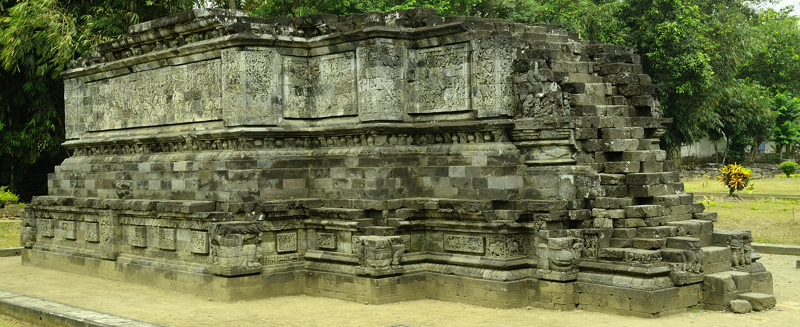
The reconstructed base of Surawana temple.

Surawana (Indonesian: Candi Surawana, sometimes called Candi Surowono) is a Hindu temple, of the Majapahit Kingdom, located in the Canggu village of the Kediri near Pare district in East Java, Indonesia. It was believed to have been built in 1390 AD as a memorial to Wijayarajasa, the Prince of Wengker. As of today the temple is not fully intact. Only the base of the temple has been restored to its original form and many more bricks are waiting around the structure to be reassembled.

== History ==
Surawana temple was built in 1390 AD but was not "officially" completed until its inception in 1400. It was built as a memorial for Wijayarajasa, the Prince of Wengker. He was Rajasanagara’s uncle as a result of marriage and he was a great influence of power. Some believe that this did not start out as a monument to the prince, but just a structure that he commissioned. That is why the dates differ when it comes to when it was completed. The sraddha ceremony, which is a ritual funeral ceremony, was held in 1400 which is why some speculate to actual completion date. Not much is known about the history after that or how it came to become dismantled, but today it stands in the small village of Canggu, in the Kediri district right out of Pare. As of right now specialists are trying to reconstruct the base to its original state

== Design ==
Surawana temple is a moderately sized temple with a base that is 7.8 square meters and is 4.6 meters high. The foot is the only existing piece or art still remaining on the structure itself. On the base there is a graduated projection that holds the stairs to the cella (3), which is an inner chamber of the temple. The structure is made to face west just like most East Javanese temples.

Surawana is adorned with many different reliefs, and many of them extend around the whole building. The stories depicted on the walls are made in a way that reflects the direction in which they are facing. For example, The Arjunawiwaha story starts on the East facing wall, then stops and restarts on the Northeast facing wall. Then it continues along the North wall and skips the East and heads down to the South and continues, in the opposite direction, to the West. Everything depicted in the reliefs have to do with the direction. Carvings facing the East, which is the direction of the rising sun and a sacred mountain (3), are the parts of the stories with more religious scenes. The carvings facing the West are more to do with demons, monsters, battles and death. The Arjunawiwaha is a continuous narrative with many different frames, but at some points it is interrupted by the Sri Tanjung and Bubuksha stories which appear on the corners on vertical panels. The panels were considered part of the original story until identified in 1939 (3).

== Decoration ==
The surface of the temple is decorated with many reliefs. It also has ganas, or servants chosen by Ganesha to serve Shiva, on the sides of the temple. They are shown holding up the building with their extended arms. They are similar to the figures shown on the structures at Candi Jawi. Also shown around the ganas are sculptures with earrings, a breastplate, necklace, jeweled belt, bracelet, armbands, and anklets. When the Majapahit Kingdom flourished, there were more contemporary aesthetic representations such as these (3).

On the base of the structure is eighteen horizontal plaques, night vertical panels, and in the middle was a plain band, which was the midsection of the temple. The stairs on the temple have nagas and makaras which are flat, ornamental reliefs in the shape of triangles and animals with their tails turning into elaborate arabesques. (3)

=== Reliefs ===
The reliefs there range from whole stories to just simple depictions of everyday life. Three of the major reliefs on the building were the Arjunawiwaha, Sri Tanjung, and Babuksha and Gagang Aking. Some smaller stories were usually ones with morals and quick lessons. A couple examples would be “Crocodile and Bull,” “Heron, Fish, and Crab,” and “Frog and Snake.” In the “Heron, Fish, and Crab” story, the characters learn a very valuable lesson. The bird in the story is wearing a headdress to try to disguise himself as a shaman so that he can go and catch fish. He starts examining three fish when he is attacked by the crab that starts to pinch his neck. The crab sees that the heron has disguised himself to confuse the fish so he pinched him to death. Many of the short stories like this have moral lessons in the end.

One of the most famous stories of all time is Arjunawiwaha. It is decorated on about six different sites in East Java. (3) It usually is on the subject of theater, dance dramas, and paintings and is still very popular. At Candi Surawana, it is on relief panels surrounding the foot of the monument. The story was composed in 1035 by a Javanese poet going by the name of Mpu Kanwa. The story was originally inspired by the Mahabharata and based upon the Kiratarjunya, written by Bharavi. This particular version of the story is modeled after King Airlangga and personifies the perfect king. (3) The perfect king would be a noble demeanor, brave and victorious in war, and be sexually irresistible. The Arjunawiwaha has three sections to it. Arjuna’s meditation, Niwatanawalan Battle, and Arjuna’s Reward into svargaloka. In the first section Arjuna is tested three times by the gods. In the second section he is assisted in his battle by Suprabha. In the last section he marries seven heavenly apsaras. This relief is one that wraps around the entire structure and starts at the east wall. It continues to the north side, but then turns back to the east. It passes where the original three scenes are and continues on the west wall and then to the south.

== See also ==
- Trowulan
- Candi of Indonesia
