= Yasadipura II =

Raden Tumenggung Yasadipura II
- Born: 1760
- Died: 21 April 1844 (83–84); Surakarta
- Other name: Raden Tumenggung Sastranagara
- Known for: Poet
- Children: Raden Ngabehi Ranggawarsita II
- Father: Yasadipura I

Tumenggung Sastronagoro also known as Yasadipura II (1760 – 21 April 1844) was a poet from the Kasunan Surakarta kingdom who worked during the reign of Pakubuwana IV to Pakubuwana VII.

== Biography ==
Tumenggung Sastronagoro inherited the pseudonym Yasadipura II from his father, Yasadipura I, who died in 1802. In addition, Sastronagoro also had the title Mas Pajangwasistho, because he was a descendant of the kings of the Pajang Sultanate. The most famous of his literary works is Serat Babat Pakepung, a historical document about the siege of the Surakarta palace by a combination of VOC, Yogyakarta and Mangkunegaran troops in 1790.

Yasadipura II was the grandfather of Ranggawarsita, the next great Surakarta poet. As a child, Ranggawarsita was spoiled by Yasadipura II, so that his grandson grew up to be a naughty child and liked to gamble. However thanks, to the training of Yasadipura II's best friend, Kyai Imam Besari from Ponorogo, Ranggawarsita's bad character changed.

In 1845, a year after the death of Yasadipura II, Ranggawarsita was appointed poet of the Surakarta palace in his place.

== Works ==
Yasadipura II frequently co-wrote many texts with his father Yasadipura I while he was alive. Many of his notable works were written in the 1820's which included:

- Serat Darmasunya (1820)
- Serat Arjuna Sasrabahu utawi Lokapala (1824)
- Sasana Sunu (1825)

Sasana Sunu in particular was meant to be read by the Javanese upper class, giving spiritual and practical advice to readers by utilizing Islamic and ancient Javanese concepts.

== Note ==
In fact, the title Ranggawarsita was first used by Sastronagoro, in addition to the title Yasadipura II. Then the title Ranggawarsita II was used by his son, namely Mas pajangswara, who worked as a palace clerk. Meanwhile, the title Ranggawarsita III was used by Mas pajangswara's son or Yasadipura II's grandson, who was none other than the next great poet, who became known as Ranggawarsita only.

== Literatur ==
- Andjar Any. 1980. Raden Ngabehi Ranggawarsita, What Happened? Semarang: Various Sciences.
- Purwadi. 2007. History of the e of Java. Yogyakarta: Media Science.
