= Kakawin Bhāratayuddha =

Balinese palm-leaf manuscript

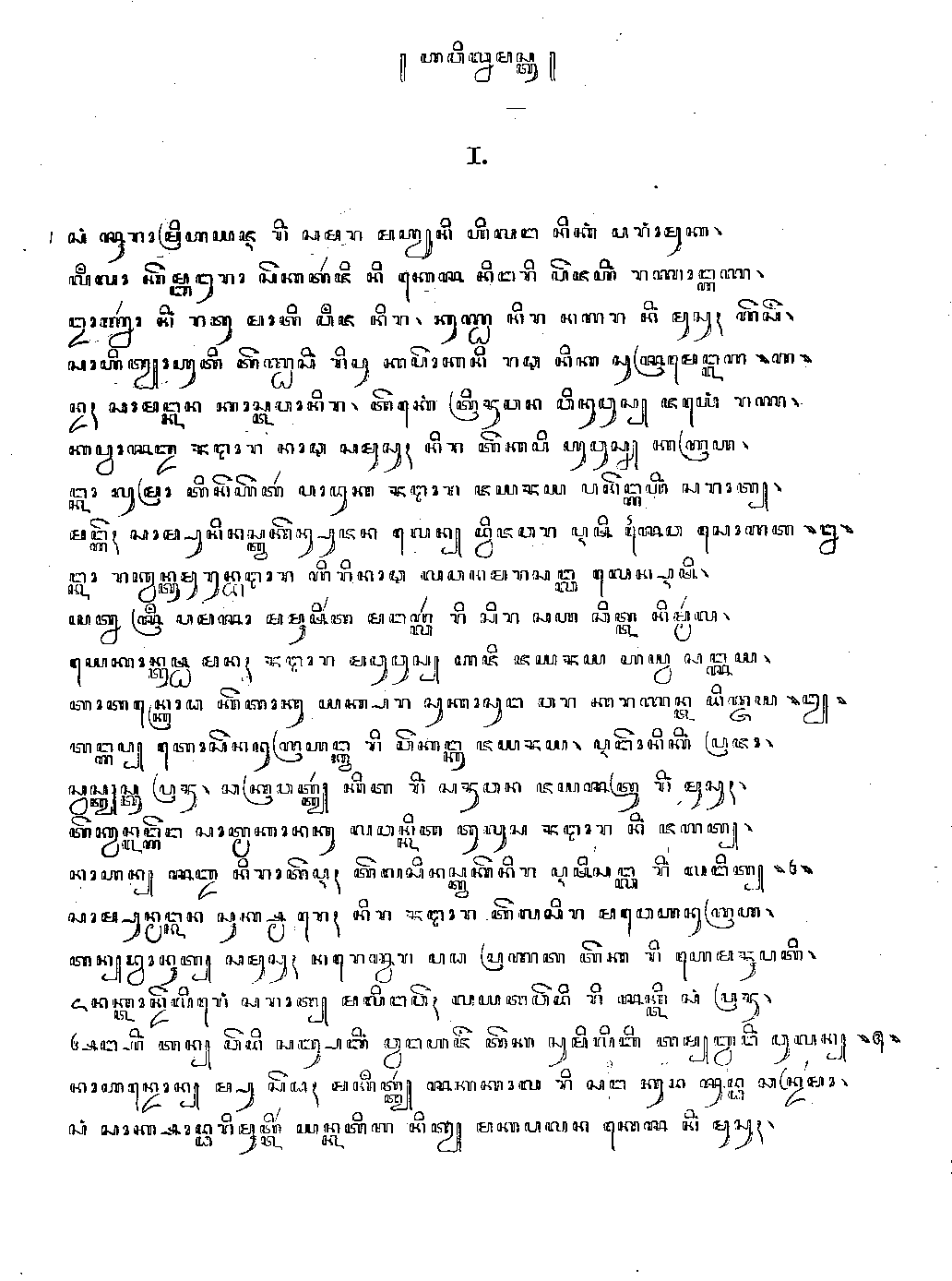
First page of Gunning's kakawin Bhāratayuddha (1903) in Javanese characters

Kakawin Bhāratayuddha is an Old Javanese poetical rendering of some books (parva) of the Mahabharata by Mpu Sedah and his brother Mpu Panuluh in Indian meters (kāvya or Kakawin). The commencement of this work was exactly 6 November 1157 by Sedah, and finished by Panuluh. The year of the composition is given in a chronogram sanga-kuda-śuddha-candramā which gives the year 1079 Saka. This is the equivalent of 1157 AD. Bhāratayuddha means "India's War" or "War of Bharat".

It is about the great war between the Pāndavas and the Kauravas on the Kuru field.

== Manuscripts of Bhāratayuddha ==
With some hundred manuscripts that are listed in the catalogues of public libraries in various countries, Kakawin Bhāratayuddha is by far the most-often copied extant Old Javanese work.

== See also ==
- Bharatayuddha
- Arjunawiwaha
- Kakawin Hariwangsa
- Kakawin Ramayana
- Kakawin Sutasoma
- Nagarakretagama
- Pararaton
- Śiwarātrikalpa
- Smaradahana
