= Petrus Josephus Zoetmulder =

Dutch missionary (1906–1995)

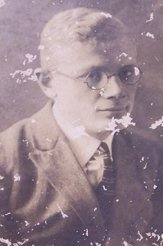
- Zoetmulder, about twenty-thirty years old
- Born: January 29, 1906; Utrecht
- Died: July 8, 1995 (aged 89); Yogyakarta
- Resting place: Muntilan
- Occupation: Jesuit

Petrus Josephus Zoetmulder S.J. (January 29, 1906 – July 8, 1995) was an Indonesian expert in the Old Javanese language. He came from Utrecht and was associated with the Society of Jesus by 1925. He worked at Leiden University in the 1930s. His first work appeared in 1930 and he continued to write into the 1990s. He lived in Yogyakarta and was interred in the Jesuit necropolis at Muntilan, Java.

His work was important in the understanding of linguistic studies of Java. He also did works on Monism and Muhammad. Merle Ricklefs translated his thesis in the 1990s.

== Childhood ==
Zoetmulder was born in Utrecht, Netherlands. From his early childhood, "Piet"—as he was called—was able to read and write even before entering school. His mother Catharina née Noelege was a professional pianist and had been a patient teacher to Piet such that he was able to be admitted to primary school without having to attend kindergarten due to his reading and writing skills. At school, he was known to be a conscientious, talented, and smart student. His father was an engineer.

Piet was raised in a Roman Catholic family, and while attending the Canisius College Mater Dei gymnasium he became interested in becoming a priest, specifically as a member of the Society of Jesus. Two of his uncles were priests, and an aunt had been a nun in Africa and Suriname. His father had to move to the town of Heerlen for his work as a public health engineer, so Piet attended a gymnasium at Rolduc instead, which was also his father's alma mater. He graduated in the A and B academic tracks. In 1925 he was admitted to the Society of Jesus Novitiate School to begin his training as a priest.

== Departure to Java ==
Father J. Willekens, S.J., his mentor at the novitiate, advised Zoetmulder to consider working for the mission on the island of Java. Following his mentor's advice, Zoetmulder departed for the Dutch East Indies as a 19-year novice. He was placed at the Intermediate Seminary in Yogyakarta, Central Java. Surprisingly, three years later his former mentor Willekens himself joined him in Java as a Visiting Apostolic. Upon meeting his former student, Willekens commented "In addition to studying philosophy, you must also learn old Javanese." He was introduced to Prof. C. C. Berg, who was an instructor in Surakarta, to help him study the language. In 1931 Zoetmulder graduated cum laude and was made a candidate priest in Girisonta, Ungaran, near Semarang.

== Continuing education ==
Upon his graduation from his study with Berg, Zoetmulder went to the University of Leiden in the Netherlands. He graduated with an associate degree in one year, contrary to the usual three years. He earned his bachelor's degree also in one year, contrary again to the usual three years customarily taken, with a degree in the history of Java and archeology. In October 1935 he successfully defended his doctoral thesis "Pantheïsme en Monisme in de Javaansche Soeloek Literatuur," with the help of Berg. He graduated cum laude. Father Zoet, as he is affectionately called, had to finish his studies in theology before he returned to Java. For four years he studied in Maastricht. Before returning to the East Indies, he had to undergo an intermediate study of religion for a year in Belgium. Unfortunately for him, the outbreak of World War II and the occupation of Belgium by Nazi forces forced him to seek refuge in France in June 1940.

He was finally able to obtain passage on a ship to the Dutch East Indies but had to make a stop in Britain to avoid German sea mines blocking the sea routes. After a month's wait, he was finally able to arrive in Java via Hong Kong. One of his colleagues had died when the ship that he boarded was torpedoed by the German Navy. Upon arrival in Java, Zoet exclaimed "God had wished for me to be happy on Javanese soil."

== Japanese Occupation and Post-World War II ==
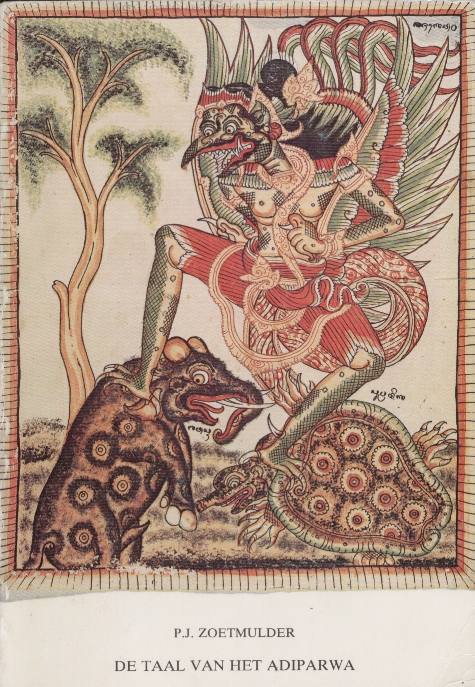
De Taal van het Adiparwa, a reprint from 1983.

After he arrived in Jakarta, Zoetmulder was offered a post in the linguistics department of the University of Indonesia. However, his strong desire to further his study of Javanese drove him to choose to reside in Yogyakarta. He then taught at the AMS and counted among his students Prof. Dr. Koentjaraningrat, Dr. Sukmono, and Dr. S. Supomo.

When Japanese forces entered Indonesia in 1942, Zoetmulder was interned as a citizen of the Netherlands. He was fortunate to be allowed to bring his books and pens as a prisoner. When he was transferred to the Cimahi prison he was able to smuggle the Adiparwa edited by Dr. H. H. Juynboll (Âdiparwa; Hendrik Herman Juynboll, ed., 1906 Koninklijk Instituut voor Taal-, Land- en Volkenkunde, M. Nijhoff) and a Javanese dictionary written by Johann Friedrich Carl Gericke-Taco Roorda. Zoetmulder attempted to study the linguistics of old Javanese through this book. His study of old Javanese grammar was eventually published in Dutch in 1954 ("De Taal van het Adiparwa") and in Indonesian in 1950 ("Bahasa Parwa") with the help of I. R. Pedjawijatna. This book eventually was adopted as the basic textbook for the study of old Javanese.

During the Indonesian National Revolution, he was nearly killed by a freedom fighter due to his Dutch complexion while he was at the Kemetiran Residence, in Yogyakarta. Fortunately, a Javanese man defended him and claimed that he was a "holy man."

== Academic career ==
After escaping the Internment camp Baros-I in 1945, he began to teach at Gadjah Mada University. Five years later he was made a Distinguished Permanent Professor of Pedagogic Literature at the same university, by a mandate from the Minister of Education and Culture. At this time he relinquished his former citizenship. His daily work was increased by his role as a representative of the dean of the Literature Department Prof. Dr. R. M. Ng. Poerbatjaraka, who was spending most of his time in Jakarta. In addition, he was teaching Old Javanese in the Yogyakarta area.

When he first started lecturing, Zoetmulder used Javanese. However, he then came to realize that many students came from outside of Java and hence did not speak Javanese fluently. To make the study easier, he wanted to write a dictionary of old Javanese, starting his work in 1950. In the beginning, he was convinced that he would be able to do it in 10 years, but in reality, he would take longer to finish the dictionary. He also wrote a compendium entitled "Sekar Sumawur: Bunga Rampai Bahasa Djawa Kuno".

His book "Kalangwan", containing an account of old Javanese belles lettres and writers, was published in 1974, to be followed by the "Old Javanese-English Dictionary" in 1982. He admitted difficulty in writing due to his having to collect his material from microfilm located at the University of Leiden.

Zoetmulder was elected a corresponding member of the Royal Netherlands Academy of Arts and Sciences in 1948.

== Death ==
Zoetmulder died on July 8, 1995, at the priest's residence in Kemetiran, Yogyakarta. He was buried at the Jesuit cemetery in Muntilan, Magelang, Central Java.

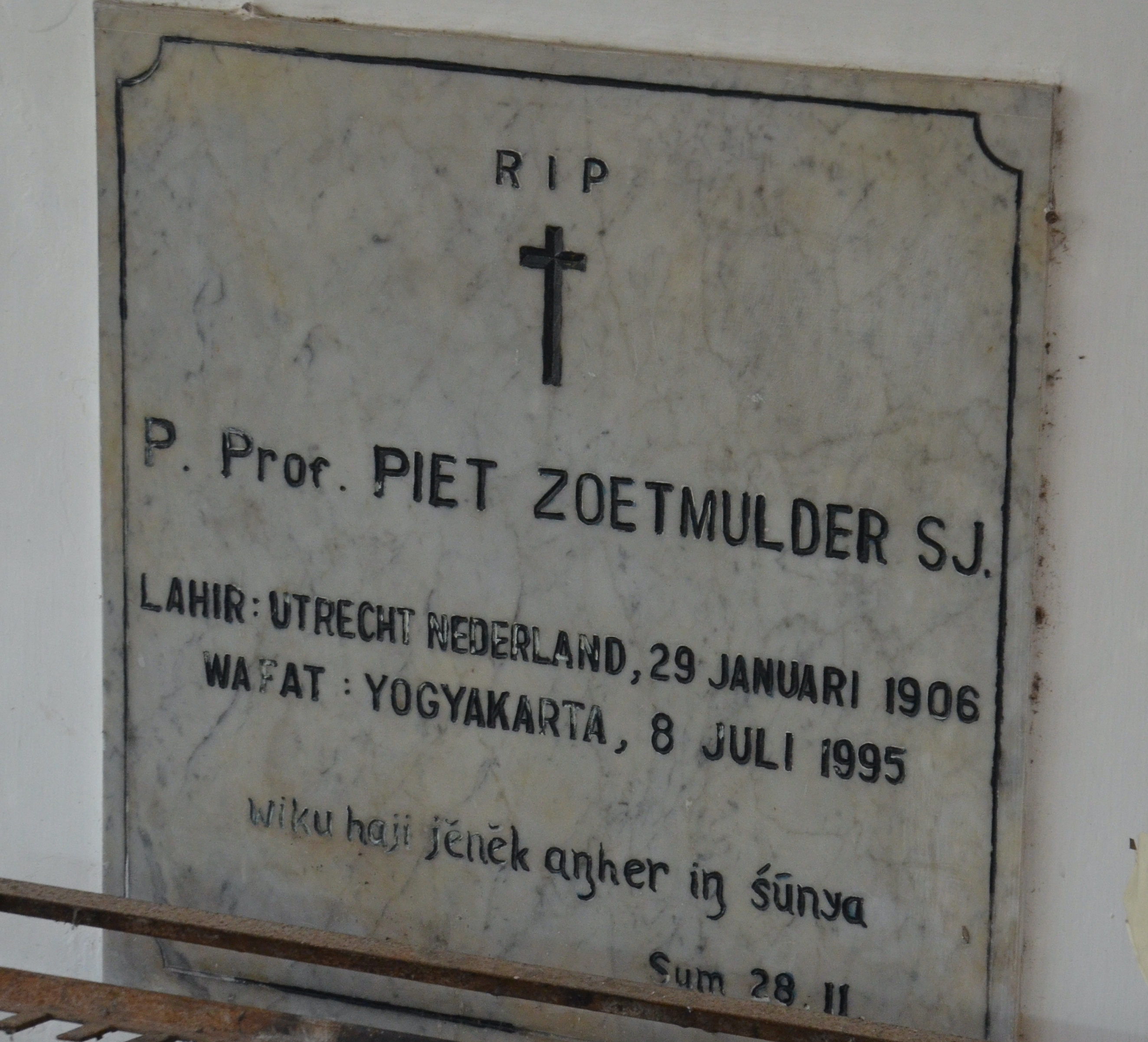
Gravestone in Muntilan

== Personal life ==
Zoetmulder was an avid reader and liked to play the violin. He considered himself Indonesian, or more specifically Javanese. "God had placed my heart in Indonesia. My residence has been decided to be here," he said. On March 3, 1951, he was naturalized as an Indonesian citizen. He enjoyed his stay at Kemetiran, which is said to be compatible with his feeling of being Javanese. He had resided there for nine years.

Father Zoet was a fan of Beethoven and Mozart. In addition to his religious and scientific textbooks, he also devoured volumes of novels poetry, and detective series. It was said that he owned more than 1,000 detective books in his room, including those written by Ngaio Marsh. He was friends with detective writer John le Carré, and while staying in Bonn, Germany, he received a gift directly from Le Carré himself: a popular book titled "The Spy Who Came in from the Cold". Le Carré's other story "A Small Town in Germany," was "inspected" by Father Zoet before publication.

== Quotes ==
- "I told them that I had come from the Netherlands myself, and yet I was able to learn it. What is most important is to have the will. Anything can be learned, nothing is difficult," retelling his argument with foreign students who felt unable to learn old Javanese.
- "To me, being a citizen of the Netherlands or Indonesia is the same. I never missed the Netherlands... When God takes my life, I wish it to happen on Java", when asked whether he regretted giving up his former citizenship.

== Publications ==
For a list of his articles, see the article in the Basa Jawa Wikipedia

=== Books ===
- 1930a - Het Land van de Profeet, Leuven: Xaveriana.
- 1930b - Mohammed de Profeet, I, In Mekka, Leuven: Xaveriana.
- 1930c - Mohammed de Profeet, II, In Medina, Leuven: Xaveriana.
- 1935 - Pantheïsme en Monisme in de Javaansche Soeloek-litteratuur, Nijmegen: Berkhout. (Doctoral thesis)
- 1950 - De Taal van het Adiparwa, Bandung: Nix
- 1951 - Cultuur Oost en West, Amsterdam: Van der Peet; Djakarta: Penerbitan Dan Balai Buku Indonesia.
- 1954 - Bahasa Parwa: Tatabahasa Djawa Kuno; bekerja sama dengan I. R. Poedjawijatna. Jilid I: Bentuk kata. Jilid II: Bentuk kalimat. Djakarta: Obor.
- 1958-1963 - Sekar Sumawur: bunga rampai bahasa Djawa Kuno. Jilid 1: Dewamānusarāksasâdi. Jilid 2: Korawapān.d.awacarita. Djakarta: Obor.
- 1965 - Die Religionen Indonesiens (Die Religionen der Menschheit; Bd. 5, 1), Stuttgart: Kohlhammer. (With Waldemar Stöhr.)
- 1969 - Siwaratrikalpa of mpu Tanakung. The Hague: Martinus Nijhoff. (Assisted by A. Teeuw, et al.)
- 1974 - Kalangwan: a survey of Old Javanese literature, The Hague: Martinus Nijhoff. ISBN 90-247-1674-8
- 1982 - Old Javanese-English Dictionary, The Hague: Martinus Nijhoff. In collaboration with S. O. Robson.
- 1983 - Kalangwan: Sastra Jawa Kuno Selayang Pandang. Jakarta: Djambatan.
- 1991 - Manunggaling Kawula Gusti: Pantheïsme dan Monisme dalam Sastra Suluk Jawa: Suatu Studi Filsafat. Jakarta: Gramedia. (Translated from the Dutch by Dick Hartoko.) ISBN 979-403-937-3
- 1992-1993 - Bahasa Parwa : tatabahasa Jawa Kuna, Yogyakarta: Gadjah Mada University Press. "Bekerja sama dengan I. J. Poedjawijatna. Cetakan ulang dari edisi tahun 1954."
- 1993 - Udyogaparwa: Teks Jawa Kuna, Jakarta: Koninklijk Instituut voor Taal-, Land- en Volkenkunde (KITLV).
- 1994-1995 - Sekar Sumawur : bunga rampai bahasa Jawa Kuna, Jilid 1: Dewamānusarāksasâdi. Jilid 2: Korawapān.d.awacarita. Yogyakarta: Gadjah Mada University Press.
- 1995a - Pantheism and Monism in Javanese Suluk Literature: Islamic and Indian Mysticism in an Indonesian Setting, Leiden: Koninklijk Instituut voor Taal-, Land- en Volkenkunde (KITLV Press). Translated from the Dutch by M. C. Ricklefs.
- 1995b - Kamus Jawa Kuna-Indonesia; bekerja sama dengan S. O. Robson, Jakarta: Gramedia dan Instituut voor Taal-, Land- en Volkenkunde (KITLV). Penerjemah: Darusuprapta dan Sumarti Suprayitna. ISBN 979-605-347-0
