= Mpu Prapanca =

Medieval Indonesian writer

- Other names: Dang Acarya Nadendra, Winada
- Occupations: Buddhist monk Member of Dharmādhyakṣa ring kasogatan Old Javanese Writer
- Notable work: Book of Nagarakretagama
- Father: Dang Acarya Kanakamuni

Mpu Prapanca wrote the Nagarakretagama, written in Old Javanese, which tells the story of the Majapahit Empire and other stories of ancient Hindu-Javanese kingdoms. The Buddhist monk Prapanca wrote the chronicle in 1365 (or 1287 Saka year) as a eulogy to Hayam Wuruk, who brought Majapahit to its peak.
