= Ranggawarsita =

Raden Ngabehi Ranggawarsita
- ꦫꦢꦺꦤ꧀ꦔꦧꦺꦲꦶꦫꦺꦴꦁꦒꦮꦂꦰꦶꦠ
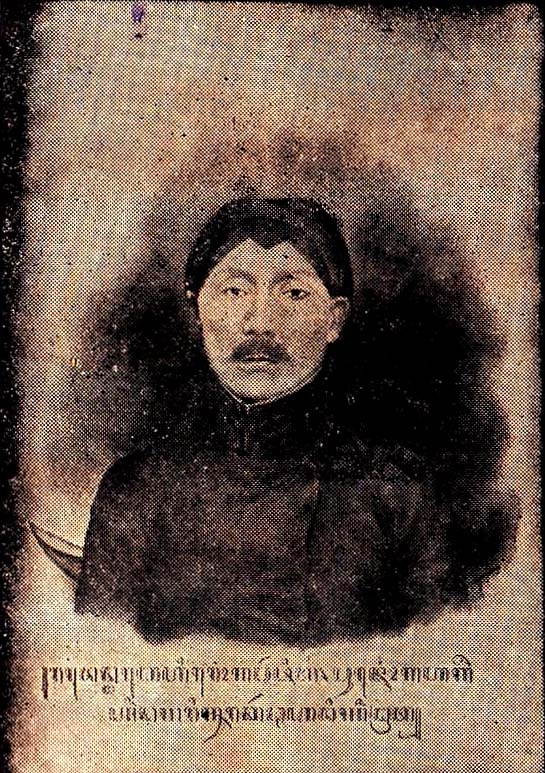
- Pronunciation: [radɛn ŋabɛhi rɔŋgɔ warsitɔ]
- Born: Bagoes Boerhan; 14 March 1802; Surakarta Sunanate, Dutch East Indies
- Died: 24 December 1873 (aged 71); Surakarta Sunanate, Dutch East Indies
- Resting place: Ranggawarsita Graveyard, Palar, Trucuk, Klaten Regency; 7.707535°S 110.6797339°E
- Occupation: Poet
- Years active: 1845-1873
- Spouse: Raden Ayu Ranggawarsita (m. 1820; died 1848) Raden Ayu Ranggawarsita II (m. 1852)
- Parents: Mas Pajangswara/Mas Ngabei Ranggawarsita II (father); Mas Ajêng Ranggawarsita (mother)

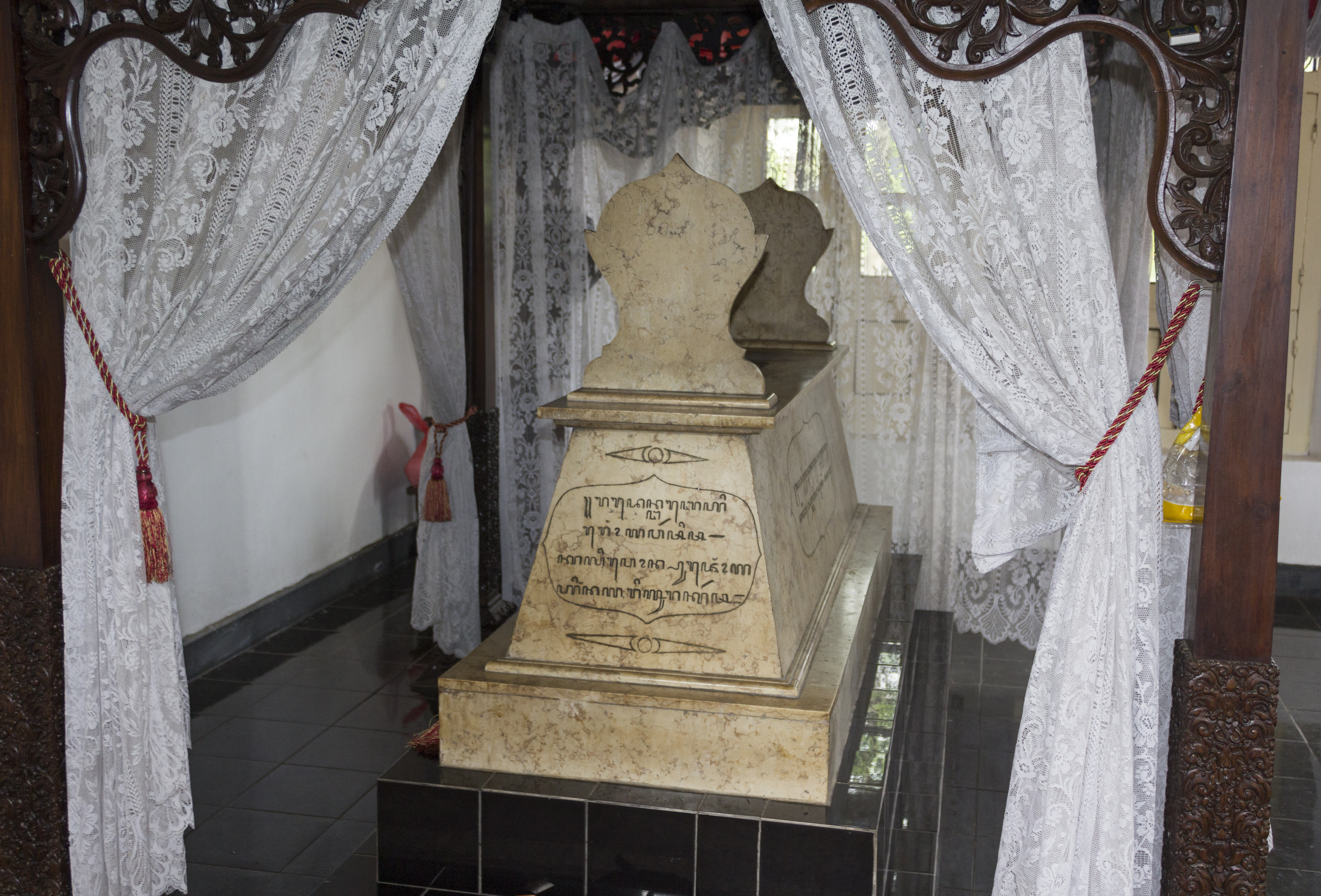
Ranggawarsita's grave in Klaten, Central Java

Raden Ngabehi Ranggawarsita (14 March 1802 – 24 December 1873, Javanese: ꦫꦢꦺꦤ꧀ꦔꦧꦺꦲꦶꦫꦺꦴꦁꦒꦮꦂꦰꦶꦠ, romanized: Raden Ngabehi Ronggawarsita, (Note: All of his works always written as Ronggawarsita, not Ranggawarsita) Javanese pronunciation: [radɛn ŋabɛhi rɔŋgɔ warsitɔ]) was a Javanese philosopher and poet. He was born into the famous literary Yasadipura family in Surakarta, in Central Java. He is sometimes called the last Javanese poet.

== Biography ==
Ranggawarsita was born in 1802 with the birth name Bagus Burhan. He was son of Mas Pajangswara and grandson of Yasadipura II, a famous poet of Surakarta Sunanate. His father was the offspring of the Kingdom of Pajang, his mother of the Demak Sultanate. Once reaching adulthood, Ranggawarsita quickly gained a reputation for his intellectual capabilities which included authoring poetry, grammar books, and working as a redactor for the Dutch periodical Bromartani.

== Works ==
Ranggawarsita authored numerous texts that covered a myriad of subjects which included poetry, mysticism, and ethics. Additionally, his works included prophecies as well as criticism of the politics and society of his time.

Some of his notable works included:

- Serat Wirit Sopanalya
- Serat Candrarani
- serat Kalatidha (A dark time)
- Sapta dharma
- Sri Kresna Barata
- Paramayoga
- Pustakaraja Purwa
- Wirid Hidayat Jati

Several works by Ranggawarsita were republished posthumously by Tan Khoen Swie of Kediri in the early 20th century.

== Legacy ==
There is a museum in his name in Semarang.
