= Old Javanese =

Oldest attested phase of the Javanese language

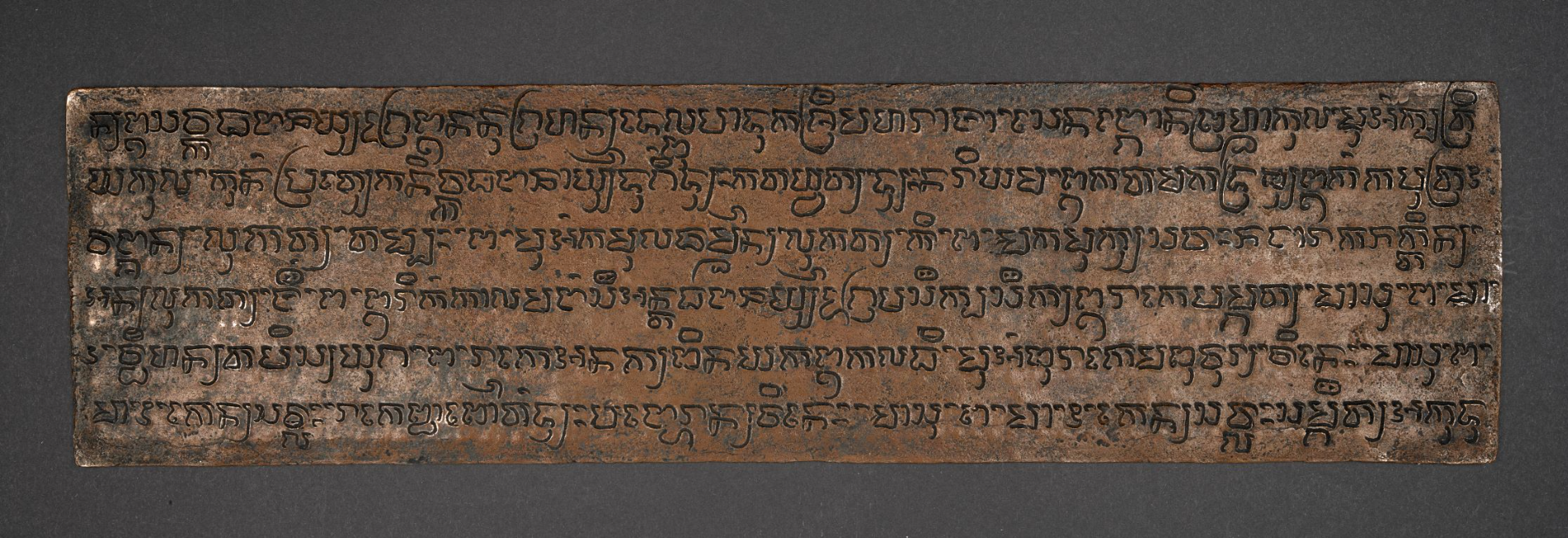
- 10th century-15th century Pabuharan inscription, written in Old Javanese language using Kawi script
- Native to: Indonesia
- Region: Java, Bali, Madura, Lombok
- Era: literary language, developed into Middle Javanese at the end of the 13th century, and developed into Early Modern Javanese by 16th-17th century
- Language family: Austronesian: Malayo-Polynesian; Old Javanese
- Writing system: Kawi, Javanese, Balinese

Language codes
- ISO 639-2: kaw
- ISO 639-3: kaw
- Glottolog: kawi1241

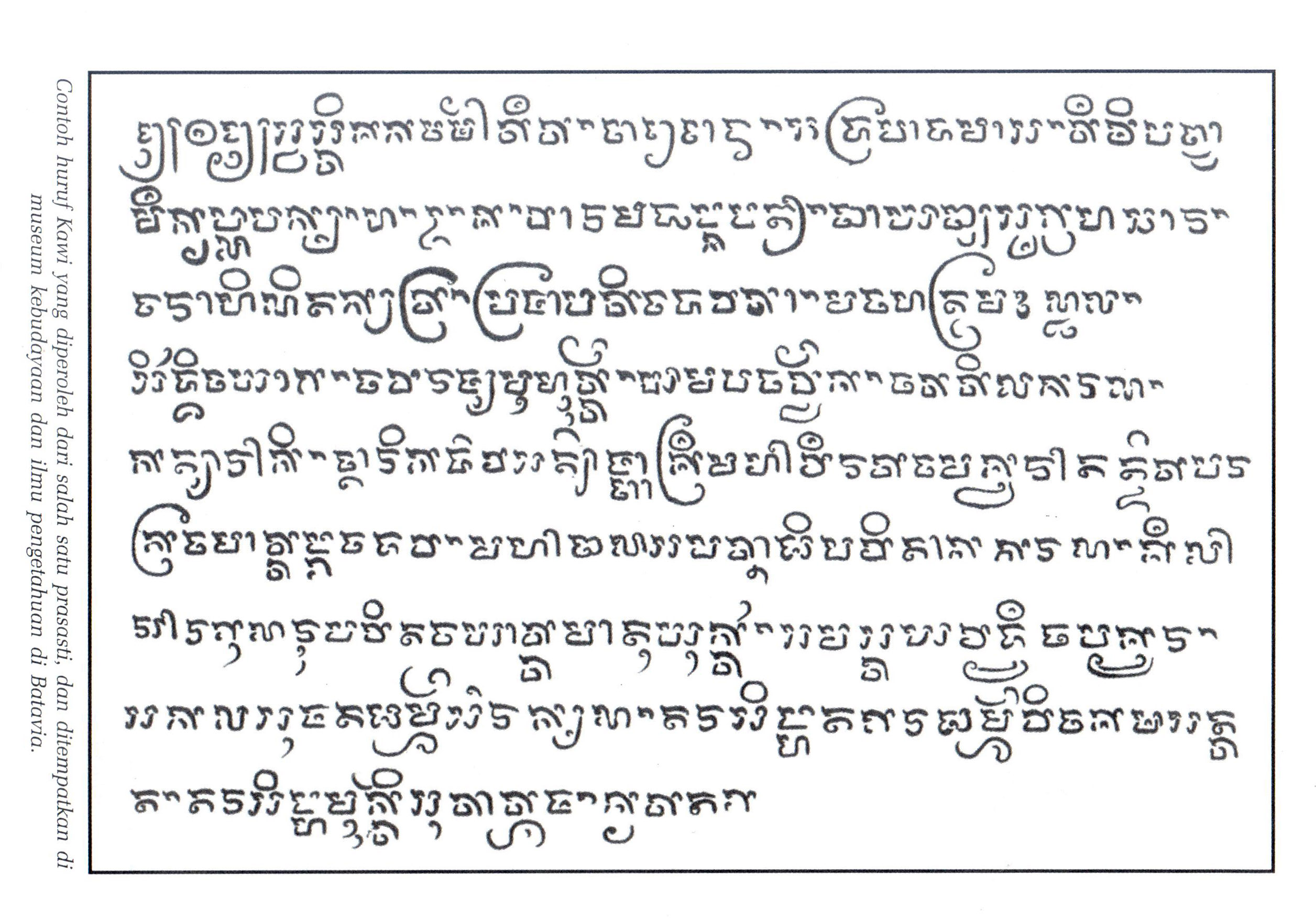
Copy of plate 1 of the Kudadu inscription (1294)

Old Javanese or Kawi is an Austronesian language and the oldest attested phase of the Javanese language. It was natively spoken in the central and eastern part of Java Island, what is now Central Java, Yogyakarta and East Java Provinces, Indonesia. As a literary language, Kawi was used across Java and on the islands of Madura, Bali, and Lombok.

== History ==
The oldest example written entirely in Ancient Javanese, called the Sukabumi inscription, is dated 25 March 804 CE. This inscription, located in the district of Kepung in the Kediri Regency of East Java, is a copy of the original, dated some 120 years earlier (only this copy has been preserved). Its contents concern the construction of a dam for an irrigation canal near the river Śrī Hariñjing (now shortened to Srinjing). This inscription is the last of its kind to be written using Pallava script; all consequent examples of Old Javanese are written using Kawi script.

=== Development ===
Old Javanese was not static, and its usage covered approximately 800 years – from the Kalingga kingdom until the founding of the Majapahit empire in 1292. The Javanese language which was spoken and written in the Majapahit era already underwent some changes and is therefore already closer to the Modern Javanese language.

==== Austronesian origins ====
The most important shaping force on Old Javanese was its Austronesian heritage in vocabulary, sentence structure, and grammar that it shared with its sister languages in Southeast Asia.

==== Sanskrit influence ====
The Indian linguistic influence in the Old Javanese language was almost exclusively Sanskrit influences (approximately 25–40%). There is no evidence of Indian linguistic elements in Old Javanese other than Sanskrit. This is different from, for example, the influence of Indian linguistics in the (Old) Malay language.

Sanskrit has had a deep and lasting impact on the vocabulary of the Javanese language. The Old Javanese–English Dictionary, written by Professor P.J. Zoetmulder in 1982, contains approximately 25,500 entries, no fewer than 12,500 of which are borrowed from Sanskrit. This large number is not an indication of usage, but it is an indication that the Ancient Javanese knew and employed these Sanskrit words in their literary works. In any given Old Javanese literary work, approximately 25% of the vocabulary is derived from Sanskrit.

=== Influences ===
Medieval poems written in Old Javanese using the Kawi script continued to be circulated within the courts of Kartasura, Surakarta, and Yogyakarta. The poems were called layang kawi (Kawi books) or kakawin and were held in high regard. Starting in the 18th century, literature inspired by Old Javanese was written using the modern Javanese language and verse.

== Phonology ==
Sanskrit has also influenced both the phonology and the vocabulary of Old Javanese. Old Javanese also contains retroflex consonants, which might have been derived from Sanskrit. That is disputed by several linguists, who hold the view that it is also possible that the occurrence of these retroflex consonants was an independent development within the Austronesian language family.

=== Vowels ===
Old Javanese has six vowels. Those vowels are ⟨a⟩, ⟨ĕ⟩ /ə/, ⟨e⟩ /e/, i, u, and o in Latin transliteration. Little can be said about the pronunciation of Old Javanese. It is believed that it has not been much different from the pronunciation of modern Javanese. However, the major difference is the pronunciation of ⟨a⟩ in open syllables: now ⟨å⟩ /ɔ/, then /a/, such as in wana (forest). Although, Old Javanese made a distinction between those "short vowels" and "long vowels" in writing such as ā, ö, e, ī, ū, and o, however, these "long vowels" have no distinction in phonology with those "short vowels". This distinction is generally found with unadapted loanwords from Sanskrit which differentiates the short and long vowels.

=== Consonants ===
There are twenty consonants in Old Javanese which are written as b, c, d, ḍ, g, h, j, k, l, m, n, ñ, ŋ, p, r, s, t, ṭ, w, and y in Latin transliteration. The consonant ⟨ñ⟩ sometimes is written as the digraph ⟨ny⟩ and IPA ɲ, while the consonant ŋ sometimes is written as the digraph ⟨ng⟩.

Consonant articulation
Place of articulation	Pancawalimukha					Semivowel	Sibilant	Fricative
Place of articulation	Unvoiced		Voiced		Nasal	Semivowel	Sibilant	Fricative
Place of articulation	Unaspirated	Aspirated^{1}	Unaspirated	Aspirated^{1}	Nasal	Semivowel	Sibilant	Fricative
Velar	ka	(kha)	ga	(gha)	ṅa			(h)a
Palatal	ca	(cha)	ja	(jha)	ña	ya	(śa)^{3}	
Retroflex	ṭa	(ṭha)	ḍa	(ḍha)	(ṇa)^{2}	ra	(ṣa)^{3}	
Dental	ta	(tha)	da	(dha)	na	la	sa	
Labial	pa	(pha)	ba	(bha)	ma	wa		
Notes^1 Aspirated consonants are pronounced as their unaspirated counterparts.^2 The retroflex nasal consonant is pronounced as the dental counterpart.^3 The sibilants are pronounced as the dental counterpart. The presence of such aspirated consonants, retroflex nasal, palatal sibilant, and retroflex sibilant are used for unadapted loanwords from Indo-Aryan languages (specifically Sanskrit).

=== Sandhi ===
Sandhi is a cover term for a wide variety of sound changes that occur at morpheme or word boundaries.

- If a word ends in a vowel and the next word in the same sentence begins with a vowel, both words may merge into one, with one vowel instead of two vowels, such as dewatādi instead of dewata + adi.
- A merger of ĕ with the preceding vowel results in assimilated ĕ to the preceding vowel, such as wawan (load, cargo; vessel, carrier, container, setting) from wawa (to carry, to bring) + ĕn.
- Similar vowels without short-long vowels consideration are assimilated as "long vowels". For example, rĕngön (hearing) is constructed from rĕngö (hearing, listening) + ĕn.
- The open vowel /a/ followed by close-front vowels of /e/ or /i/ are assimilated as /e/, such as bhinna ika become bhinneka (those are different). Meanwhile, the open vowel /a/ followed by close-back vowels of /o/ or /u/ is assimilated as /o/, such as mantra oṣadha becomes mantroṣadha.
- The semi-vowel y or w will replace the corresponding vowel i, u, or ö, when followed by a dissimilar vowel. For example, kadi amṛta become kadyamṛta (i + a → ya), ri ubhaya become ryubhaya (i + u → yu), milu āśā become milwāśā (u + a → wa), māsku ibu become māskwibu (u + i → wi), and angangsö agawe become angangswagawe (ö + a → wa).

== Grammar ==
=== Verb ===
Old Javanese verbs are morphologically complex and are conjugated by taking on a variety of affixes reflecting focus/trigger, aspect, voice, and other categories.

==== Voice/Focus/Trigger ====
- The active voice is derived through either prefix (m)aN- or infix -um-.
  - The prefix (m)aN-, which is realized as maN- and aN-, is the prefix to make transitive verbs, for example, amati (to kill) from pati (death) and mangan (to eat) from pangan (food), if the base word is a verb. However, if the base word is a noun, the derivation can result in both transitive and intransitive verbs, such as angjanma (to be born, incarnate) from janma (man), whether the result will be either transitive or intransitive can not be predicted. In the base word is an adjective, the derived verbs are causative, such as anghilang (to cause something to disappear) from hilang (disappeared). The derivation can undergo denasalization in particular situations such as pamangan instead of mamangan (to eat) and panginum instead of manginum (to drink).
  - The infix -um- is the prefix to show active verb which generally shows no difference in meaning with the derivation with prefix (m)aN-. Sometimes, there is a difference in meaning between the prefixed (m)aN- and infixed -um-, such as anahur (to repay) and sumahur (to answer) from sahur (answer, return).
- Passive voices are derived through either the prefix ka- or infix -in-. It is not necessary to express the actor in a passive sentence. If the actor is explicitly mentioned, the actor is introduced by de and put after the subject, such as "Katon pwa ta de sang Śrutasena".
  - The prefix ka- refers to passive voice. If it is put before the consonant of the stem, it shows no change. However, if it is put before vowels, the sandhi is applicable, such as in kālap (taken) from ka- + alap. Other than ā from a + a, the other sandhi is ā from a + ĕ /ə/, e from a + either i or e, and o from a + u (there is no example with a + o exist).
  - The other passive voice derivation is through infix -in-, such as inalap (taken) from alap.

Nasalization rule for prefix (m)aN-
Initial of base word	Sandhi	Harmonized prefix	Examples
nasal (m-, n-, ng-)	(m)aN- + N- → (m)a-	(m)a-	maga → amaga (to disappoint)
k	(m)aN + k- → (m)ang-	(m)ang-	kĕmit → angĕmit (to guard)
p, w	(m)aN- + p-,w- → (m)am-	(m)am-	pahat → amahat (to tap)
s, t	(m)aN- + s-,t- → (m)an-	(m)an-	sambut → anambut (to seize)
c	(m)aN- + c- → (m)any-	(m)any-	cangking → anyangking (to carry)
vowels	(m)aN- + V- → (m)ang- + V-	(m)ang-	abĕn → angabĕn (to attack)
d, g, h	(m)aN- + d-,g-,h- → (m)ang- + d-,g-,h-	(m)ang-	haḍang → anghaḍang (to stand off)
j	(m)aN- + j- → (m)ang- + j-	(m)ang-	jajah → angjajah (to explore)
semivowel (r, l, w)	(m)aN- + H- → (m)ang- + H-	(m)ang-	liput → angliput (to envelop)
b	(m)aN- + b- → (m)am- + b-	(m)am-	bawa → ambawa (to bring)

Nasalization rule for infix -um-
Initial of base word	Sandhi	Harmonized infix	Examples
vowels	-um- + V- → umV-	umV-	alap → umalap (to take)
labials (b-,p-,m-,w-)	-um- + C- → um-	um-	wawa → umawa (to carry)
others	no change	no change	jawil → jumawil (to touch)

==== Case ====
- The beneficiary-orientedness or plurality can be indicated with the suffix -i and -an. The suffix -i is used for active transitive verbs (with prefix (m)aN- or infix -um-) which harmonized into either -i (amatī, to slay, from pati) and -ani (amatyani, to slay, from pati) after a vowel. However, passive transitive verbs use the suffix -an (with the prefix ka- or infix -in-). In case of a final vowel -a, -an is attached, not -anan, for example, kapaḍan.
- Causative can be indicated by the suffix -akĕn from verbal and nominal bases (either prefix (m)aN- or infix -um-). The verb with -akĕn is object-oriented. There is no combination between the passive ka- and with suffix -akĕn.
- Applicative can be indicated by prefix maka- and pinaka- with sandhi rules applied. Prefix maka- is used for active voice (with (m)aN- and -um- integrated), while passive voice uses the prefix pinaka- (with -in- and ka- integrated). The denasalisation phenomenon can happen.

==== Mood ====
- Irrealis mood can be indicated by suffix -a to the verbs. The active irrealis verb can be constructed as active affixes (prefix (m)aN- or infix -um-) with suffix -a (such as manghuripa from manghurip). However, passive irrealis can be constructed with suppression of infix -in- and addition of the suffix -ĕn (such as huripĕn), while the suffix -a is added to passive verbs prefixed with ka-. The presence of sandhi sometimes makes it impossible to see whether -a of irrealis mood. In the case of pronominal suffix presence, the irrealis suffix is prioritized.
- There are three ways to put a verb in the imperative mood.
  - ...by the bare indicative form without any changes, such as mijil (please come out) and anunggangi (please mount), which is the polite form. This form is just recognized by the context.
  - ...drop the verbal prefix, such as wijil and tunggangi.
  - ...place either t(a) or p(a) before the unchanged or reduced form, such as ta mijil, ta wijil, pamijil or pawijil and tānunggangi, ta tunggangi, pānunggangi or patunggangi.
- Prohibition is expressed by the word haywa (do not), such as "haywa ta kita malara!" (Don't be sad!).

Construction of verbs in irrealis mood
Irrealis mood	Benefactive case -i	Causative case -akĕn
Active voice prefix (m)aN- or infix -um-	the prefix (m)aN- or infix -um- present the suffix -ana	the prefix (m)aN- or infix -um- present the suffix -akna or -akĕn
Passive voice infix -in-	the infix -in- absent the suffix -ana	the infix -in- absent the suffix -akna or -akĕn

=== Noun and pronoun ===
==== Particle ====
There are various particles in Old Javanese. Particle ta is the most common one. The other particles that occur regularly are pwa, ya, and sira. These ya and sira as particles must be differentiated from the personal pronouns ya and sira, 'he, she'. Sometimes they are combined such as ta pwa and ta ya. It is not compulsory to use them; they are often left out.

==== Personal pronouns and pronominal suffixes ====
Old Javanese have several personal pronouns for the first, second, and third person. The pronoun is not differentiated by singular and plural and social status in general. Sira may be used as an honorific particle, similar to sang.

Old Javanese Personal Pronouns
	low/neutral	neutral	neutral/high
first person		aku (singular only) kami, mami	
second person	ko	kita, kamu, kanyu	
third person	ya		sira

The personal pronoun has corresponding pronominal suffixes which serve to express either the possessive relationship or an agent.

Old Javanese Pronominal Suffixes
	low/neutral	neutral
first person		-ku -mami
second person	-mu -nyu	-ta
third person	-nya	-nira

The suffixes exhibit sandhi features, such as

- The suffix -ku has no change after a consonant, such as in tanganku (my hand). However, the suffix will change into -ngku after a vowel.
- The suffix -ta has no change after consonant, but will change into -nta after vowel.
- The suffix -nya will change into -ya after n.
- The suffix -nira will change into -ira after n.

The third person pronominal suffixes can express a possessive relationship between two words, such as in "Wĕtunira sang Suyodhana" (the birth of Suyodhana).

The third person pronominal suffixes can be used to nominalize verbs and adjectives such as widagdhanya (his skills) from adjective widagdha and pinintanira (his being asked) from the verb pininta.

In Old Javanese, a large number of other words than personal pronouns are used by way of personal pronouns for the first and second person. They consist of fixed expressions in which the original meaning of the words involved does not play a role and a virtually boundless list of words referring to functions and family relations. Proper names do not play a role in this respect. For example, first person pronouns can be manifested as nghulun (hulun, slave) and ngwang (wwang, man).

==== Demonstrative pronouns ====
Old Javanese has four sets of demonstrative pronouns. The members of each set represent different degrees of distance seen from the speaker, while the four sets at least in theory express different shades of stress.

Demonstrative pronouns in Old Javanese
	neutral	stress	more stress	more stress
this	iki	tiki	ike	
that (with the listener)	iku	tiku	iko	
that (far from both)	ika	tika	ikā	tikā

==== Determiner ====
Old Javanese does not have an indefinite article. A noun without an article is indefinite. Old Javanese has three sorts of articles to express definiteness: a definite article, several honorific articles, and ika (there are still other ways of expressing definiteness in Old Javanese, for example, the possessive suffix). Both definite articles and honorific articles are placed before the noun and cannot stand by themselves. The definite article is (a)ng and it is written combined with particles. Examples of honorific articles that express a certain amount of respect are si, pun, sang, sang hyang, ḍang hyang, śrī, and ra.

Besides the definite article and the articles of respect, ika can be used to express definiteness. The word ika has two functions, those are definite article and demonstrative pronoun. The word ika as a demonstrative pronoun means 'that' which is used to differentiate from 'this'. If there is no such contrast, its function is that of a definite article, meaning 'the'. Ika is put in front of the word to which it belongs and always combined with the definite article.

==== Possessive suffixes ====
Expression of possessiveness in Old Javanese is done with the help of possessive suffixes, such as suffix -(n)ing and -(n)ika. The suffix -ning is constructed from clitic -(n)i and the definite article (a)ng. The clitic -(n)i have no meaning and cannot stand alone, although it is required in the construction. It is generally written as -ning, while it is written as -ing after base word ending in n. The suffix -(n)ika is constructed from clitic -(n)i and definite article ika and is written as -nika generally, while it is written as -ika after base word ending in n. The possessiveness can be expressed with pronominal suffixes, in which no definite article is added in a such case. Honorific articles can also express possessiveness and definiteness, such as ujar sang guru (the word of the teacher), by placing the honorific article after the possessed noun and followed by the possessor.

=== Adjective ===
Old Javanese have two types of adjectives. The first one is an adjective-class base word, such as urip (alive). The second one is an adjective-class-derived word that uses affixation with the prefix (m)a- from noun base words, such as adoh (far away) from doh (distance), ahayu (beautiful) from hayu (beauty) and mastrī (married) from strī (wife). In case of derivation with the prefix (m)a-, the sandhi law is observed especially when the base word starts with a vowel, such as mānak (having a child) from anak (child), enak (at ease) from inak (ease), and mojar (having speech) from ujar (speech), while there is no change if the word begins with a consonant. Nouns can be qualified by adjectives.

=== Adverb ===
Verbs and adjectives, and also adverbs, can be qualified by adverbs. Adverbs are placed before of the words they qualify, except dahat (very, very much) is placed after the word. The word tan is used to express 'not' and have several forms as tatan, tātan, ndatan, and ndātan.

=== Preposition ===
There are several prepositions in Old Javanese, in which the noun preceded by the preposition is definite, such as:

- Preposition (r)i has the meaning of 'in', 'on', 'at', and 'to', but also 'for', 'towards', and even 'by', and 'through'.
- Preposition sa(ng)ka has the meaning of 'from', 'compared to' ('than' in comparisons), 'because of'.
- Combination of both prepositions

However, there are particularities in the expression of 'inside' or 'from inside' in Old Javanese. Old Javanese use a combination of either jĕro or dalĕm (inner part, depth) followed by clitic -ni, such as dalĕmnikang to express the idea of 'inside' or 'from inside'. The preposition of the inside is expressed by placing either (r)i or sake before either jĕro or dalĕm (inner part, depth) without placement of both clitic -ni and definite articles.

It is important to remember that (r)i can be used as an object marker of transitive verb and proper noun maker.

=== Conjunction ===
There are several conjunctions in Old Javanese; the most common ones are an, yan, apan, and yarapwan. The order of elements in sub-clauses headed by an is the same as in main clauses: the subject follows the predicate. However, different from main clauses, in sub-clauses headed by an no separating particle is used.

- Conjunction an can be interpreted as either 'that', 'so that, in order to' and 'while, as'. The use of an may cause the suppression of -um- and denasalization.
- Conjunction yan means 'that' or 'if, when'.
- Conjunction apan means 'because'.

=== Syntax ===
In a basic clause, predicate and subject are separated from each other by a particle (ta) marking the border between both parts of the sentence. For example, "lunghā ta sira" means "he leaves" as leave (lunghā), particle (ta), and the third person pronoun (sira). The predicate comes first in the sentence, the subject follows the predicate, which is the normal order. However, the reversed order also occurs which it signals of some particularity such as stress intended by the writer. These sentences lack an indication of time.

Subject in Old Javanese can be personal pronoun, noun, and proper names. The predicate can be a verbal predicate where the predicate is a verb. The predicate can also be a nominal predicate, where the predicate can be an adjective and nouns, including proper names, and pronouns. Old Javanese verbs are not conjugated and do not formally distinguish between present and past time.

== Vocabulary ==
The most important shaping force on Old Javanese was its Austronesian heritage in vocabulary that it shared with its sister languages in Southeast Asia.

A related question is the form in which Sanskrit words were loaned in Old Javanese. The borrowed Sanskrit words in Old Javanese are almost without exceptions nouns and adjectives in their undeclined form (Sanskrit lingga). Old Javanese texts contain many more characters with similar phonology values to represent distinct vowels and consonants in Sanskrit such as unadapted loanwords. Wherever these diacritics occur in Old Javanese texts, they are neglected in pronunciation: bhaṭāra is the same as baṭara (loss of vowel length and aspiration is also shared by Elu Prakrit, the ancestor of Sinhala). Nor do they influence the order of the words in the dictionary: the variants s, ṣ, and ś, for example, are all treated like s.

Examples of Old Javanese Vocabulary
Old Javanese		Source				Notes
Words	Meaning	Language	Words		Meaning	Notes
abhyāsa	to be practiced in, to occupy; to be familiar with, acquainted with, at home in	Sanskrit	अभ्यास	abhyāsa	drill, habit	
apuy	fire (oxidation reaction)	Proto-Malayo-Polynesian		*hapuy	fire	
camĕṭi	whip	Tamil	சம்மட்டி	cammaṭṭi	horse-whip, large hammer	
duh	juice; sap; oil	Proto-Malayo-Polynesian		*zuʀuq	sap, juice	
jro	inside; interior; depth	Proto-Austroasiatic		*ɟruh, *ɟruuʔ	deep	
juruh	syrup, liquid sugar	Proto-Malayo-Polynesian		*zuʀuq	sap, juice	
kidaṅ	Muntjac	Proto-Austroasiatic		*jəŋ	deer, venison	
lāghawa	swift, agile; dextrous, versatile, skilled; versed, accomplished	Sanskrit	लाघव	lāghava	ease, relief	
tūt	following; along	Proto-Malayo-Polynesian		*tuʀut	to follow instructions, follow an example; carry along, give in, allow something to happen	

== Orthography ==
Old Javanese was written with Kawi or Old Javanese script in 8th–16th century. The Kawi script is a Brahmic script found primarily in Java and used across much of Maritime Southeast Asia. The Kawi script is related to the Pallava script and Kadamba script in South India. Nowadays, Old Javanese can be written with Balinese script and Javanese script in modern literatures which are descendants of Kawi script.

== Usage ==
=== Oral expression ===
Kawi is not truly extinct as a spoken language. It is commonly used in some Javanese traditional events such as wayang golek, wayang wong and wayang kulit, in addition to high activities such as a Javanese wedding, especially for the stylised meeting ritual of bride's parents with groom's parents in the ceremonies of Peningsetan and Panggih. Archaically or for certain nobles very strongly attached to tradition, it is used for the Midodareni, Siraman and Sungkeman ceremonies of the Javanese wedding.

The island of Lombok has adopted Kawi as its regional language, reflecting the very strong influence of East Java. Today, it is taught in primary school education as part of the compulsory secondary language unit of National curriculum. Traditionally, Kawi is written on lontar prepared palm leaves.

=== Literature ===
Kawi remains in occasional use as an archaic prose and literary language, in a similar fashion to Shakespeare-era English.

There are many important literary works written in Kawi, most notably Empu Tantular's epic poem, "Kakawin Sutasoma", from which is taken the National motto of Indonesia: "Bhinneka Tunggal Ika". Although often glibly translated as "Unity in Diversity", it is more correctly rendered as "[although] scattered, remaining [as] one"—referring to the scattered islands of the archipelago nation, not as an expression of multicultural solidarity as may be perceived in modern times.

A more modern work is the poem "Susila Budhi Dharma", by Muhammad Subuh Sumohadiwidjojo, the founder of Subud. In this work, he provides a framework for understanding the experience of the latihan kejiwaan.

==== List of famous poems, epics and other literature ====
Famous poems, epics and other literature include:

- Shivagrha inscription, 856
- Kakawin Ramayana ~ 870
- Kakawin Arjunawiwaha, mpu Kanwa, ~ 1030
- Kakawin Kresnayana
- Kakawin Sumanasantaka
- Kakawin Smaradhana
- Kakawin Bhomakawya
- Kakawin Bharatayuddha, mpu Sedah and mpu Panuluh, 1157
- Kakawin Hariwangsa
- Kakawin Gatotkacasraya
- Kakawin Wrettasañcaya
- Kakawin Wrettayana
- Kakawin Brahmandapurana
- Kakawin Kunjarakarna, mpu "Dusun"
- Kakawin Nagarakertagama, mpu Prapanca, 1365
- Kakawin Arjunawijaya, mpu Tantular
- Kakawin Sutasoma, mpu Tantular
- Kakawin Siwaratrikalpa, Kakawin Lubdhaka
- Kakawin Parthayajna
- Kakawin Nitisastra
- Kakawin Nirarthaprakreta
- Kakawin Dharmasunya
- Kakawin Harisraya
- Kakawin Banawa Sekar Tanakung
- Pararaton (16th century), a chronicle of the kingdoms of Singhasari and Majapahit
- Tantri Kamandaka, a collection of fables based on the Panchatantra

==== Prominent authors ====
The following are notable authors of literary works in Kawi.

- Mpu Kanwa (11th century)
- Mpu Sedah (12th century)
- Mpu Panuluh (12th century)
- Mpu Dharmaja (12th century)
- Mpu Monaguna (12th century)
- Mpu Triguna (12th century)
- Mpu Tantular (14th century)
- Mpu Prapanca (14th century)
- Mpu Tanakung (15th century)

=== Inscription ===
The earliest written records in an indigenous language found in Java are indeed in (Old) Javanese.

- Karangtengah inscription (824 CE)
- Tri Tepusan inscription (842 CE)
- Shivagrha inscription (856 CE)
- Mantyasih inscription (907 CE)
- Turyyan inscription (929)
- Anjuk Ladang inscription (935/937)
- Terep inscription (1032)
- Turun Hyang II inscription (1044)
- Kambang Putih inscription (1050)
- Banjaran inscription (1052)
- Malenga inscription (1052)
- Garaman inscription (1053)
- Sumengka inscription (1059)
- Hantang/Ngantang inscription (1135)
- Mula Malurung inscription (1255)
- Kudadu inscription (1294)
- Tuhañaru/Jayanagara II inscription (1323)
- Waringin Pitu inscription (1447)

Nevertheless, there are exceptions to this pattern of language distribution in the epigraphical record. There are several inscription using Old Javanese language on the island of Sumatra, by editing three short epigraphs.

- Inscription of Kapalo Bukit Gombak II
- Inscribed Makara from the Northern Gopura, Candi Kedaton, Muara Jambi Temple Complex
- Inscribed Golden Bowl of Rokan Hilir, Riau

== Scholars ==
The first scholar to address Kawi in a serious academic manner was Wilhelm von Humboldt, who considered it the father of all Malay-Polynesian languages. Furthermore, he deprecated misconceptions about Kawi being wholly influenced by Sanskrit, finding that Kawi did not use verb inflexion, thus differing from Sanskrit's highly developed inflectional system. Kawi might have come from a very ancient settlement in the pacific side of Asia. In Kawi language, the meaning of a sentence must be grasped through word order and context. Humboldt further claimed that Kawi utilizes tense distinctions, with past, present, and future, and differentiated moods via the imperative and subjunctive.

Numerous scholars have studied the language, including the Dutch expatriate Indonesian Prof. Dr. Petrus Josephus Zoetmulder S.J., who contributed an enormous quantity of original texts and serious scholarly study to the language, and his pupil and associate, Father Dr. Ignatius Kuntara Wiryamartana. Other eminent Indonesian scholars of the language include Poedjawijatna, Sumarti Suprayitna, Poerbatjaraka and Tardjan Hadiwidjaja.

== See also ==
- Bhinneka Tunggal Ika
- Johan Hendrik Caspar Kern
- Eugenius Marius Uhlenbeck
- Petrus Josephus Zoetmulder
- Old Malay
- Old Sundanese

== Bibliography ==
- De Casparis, J. G (1975). Indonesian Palaeography: A History of Writing in Indonesia from the beginnings to c. AD 1500. Leiden/Köln: E. J. Brill.
- Florida, Nancy K. (1993). Javanese Literature in Surakarta Manuscripts: Introduction and Manuscripts of the Karaton Surakarta. Ithaca, N.Y.: Cornell University. ISBN 0-87727-603-X.
- Wilhelm von Humboldt (1836). Über die Kawi-Sprache [On the Kawi Language] (in German): Vol 1, Vol 2, Vol 3
- Poerbatjaraka; Tardjan Hadiwidjaja (1952). Kepustakaan Djawa. Djakarta/Amsterdam: Djambatan.
- Avenir Stepanovich Teselkin (1972). Old Javanese (Kawi). Cornell University. Modern Indonesia Project. Translation series. Ithaca, N.Y.: Modern Indonesia Project, Southeast Asia Program, Cornell University.
- Teeuw, A.; Robson, S.O., eds. (2005). Bhomāntaka: the death of Bhoma. Bibliotheca Indonesica, 32. Leiden: KITLV Press. ISBN 90-6718-253-2.
- Uhlenbeck, E.M. (1964). A Critical Survey of Studies on the Languages of Java and Madura. The Hague: Martinus Nijhoff.
- Zurbuchen, Mary S. (1976). Introduction to Old Javanese Language and Literature: A Kawi Prose Anthology. Ann Arbor: University of Michigan. doi:10.3998/mpub.11902952. hdl:20.500.12657/41870. ISBN 9780472902187.
- Zoetmulder, P.J.; Robson, S.O. (1995). Kamus Jawa Kuna–Indonesia. Translated by Darusuprapta; Sumarti Suprayitna. Jakarta: Instituut voor Taal-, Land- en Volkenkunde and Lembaga Ilmu Pengetahuan Indonesia and PT Gramedia Pustaka Utama. ISBN 979-605-347-0.
- 1992–1993, Bahasa parwa : tatabahasa Jawa Kuna: Yogyakarta: Gadjah Mada University Press. Bekerja sama dengan I.J. Poedjawijatna. Cetakan ulang dari edisi tahun 1954
- Zoetmulder, P.J. (1950). De Taal van het Adiparwa (in Indonesian). Bandung: Nix.
- Zoetmulder, P.J.; S.O. Robson (1982). Old Javanese – English Dictionary. The Hague: Martinus Nijhoff. ISBN 90-247-6178-6.
- Zoetmulder, P.J. (1974). Kalangwan: A Survey of Old Javanese Literature. The Hague: Martinus Nijhoff.
