= Kakawin Bhomantaka =

Old javanese kakawin

Kakawin Bhomantaka is an Old Javanese Hindu Kakawin written around the 12th century. It is one of the longest Kakawins, being composed of nearly 1,500 stanzas, with a total of about 6,000 total lines of verse.

== Cultural impact ==
The Bomantaka, despite being composed in Java, has been forgotten entirely from there, but still lives on in Bali, where it is embedded in the local culture, and has been continuously sung, read, performed, and transmitted.
