= Mpu Panuluh =

Indonesian poet

Mpu Panuluh was a Javanese literary poet who lived during the Jayabaya reign of the Kadiri Kingdom in Java, Indonesia. He is especially well known for completing writing of Kakawin Bhāratayuddha which was pioneered by his brother, Mpu Sedah. Mpu Panuluh also wrote Kakawin Hariwangsa and Gatotkacasraya.
