= Mpu Dusun =

Medieval Indonesian writer

Mpu Dusun was a Javanese Buddhist guru and writer who lived in the later Majapahit period, in the late 14th to early 15th century period.

== Personal life ==
The name Mpu Dusun is a pen name, his birth name is unknown. He is identified as Mpu Dusun in his work Kakawin Kunjarakarna in the final stanza when he states "kīrti sira mpu Dusun" - this is a work of mpu Dusun. He is theorized to have come from a rural background, and did not spend much of his life in a court, unlike other poets of the time. He was a Buddhist monk or a priest, but much of his work was syncretic with the dominant Hinduism of the time.

== Works ==
- Kakawin Kunjarakarna
