= Eugenius Uhlenbeck =

Dutch linguist and Indologist

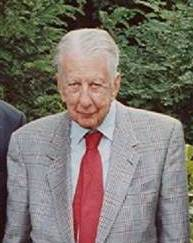
Uhlenbeck (2002)

Eugenius Marius ('Bob') Uhlenbeck (The Hague (Den Haag), 9 August 1913 – Voorhout, 27 May 2003) was a Dutch linguist and Indologist. He was a professor in Javanese at Leiden University. In 1967 he became member of the Royal Netherlands Academy of Arts and Sciences.

== Family ==
His brother was George Uhlenbeck, the theoretical physicist, and the linguist C.C. Uhlenbeck was a cousin of his father.

== Selected publications ==
- Taalwetenschap. Een eerste inleiding. Uitg. H.L. Smits, Den Haag.
- Beknopte Javaansche grammatica. Uitg. Balé Poestaka, Batavia, 1941.
- De systematiek der Javaanse pronomina. Uitg. M. Nijhoff, Den Haag, 1960.
- Aantekeningen bij Tjan Tjoe Siem's vertaling van de lakon Kurupati rabi. Uitg. M. Nijhoff, Den Haag, 1960.
- A critical survey of studies on the Languages of Java and Madura. Uitg. M. Nijhoff, Den Haag, 1964.
- Enige beschouwingen over Amerikaanse en Nederlandse linguïstiek. In: Forum der Letteren 7, 1966, pp. 1–22.
- Critical comments on transformational-generative grammar 1962-1972, 1973.
- Structurele taalwetenschap. In: Frieda Balk-Smit Duyzentkunst e.a.: Controversen in de taal- en literatuurwetenschap, 1974, pp. 138–168.
- Nederlandse voorlichting over generatieve grammatica. In: Forum der Letteren 18, 1977, pp. 167–210.
- Studies in Javanese morphology. Uitg. M. Nijhoff, 1978.
- Linguistics in America 1924-1974, a detached view. In: H.M. Hoenigswald (ed.): The European background of American linguistics, 1979.
