= Kakawin Hariwangsa =

- Also known as: ᬓᬓᬯᬶᬦ᭄ ᬳᬭᬶᬯᬗ᭄ᬰ

Kakawin Hariwangsa is an Old Javanese poem in Indian metres (kakawin or kavya) which tells the story of Krishna, as an Avatar of Vishnu, when he wished to marry the Goddess Rukminī, from the land of Kundina, and daughter of Lord Bhishmaka. Rukmini is an avatar of the goddess Śrī.

== Meaning of the title ==
In its most fundamental meaning, Hariwangsa means the genealogy or family tree of the god Hari, or Vishnu. In India Harivamśa in Sanskrit is a literary work about Vishnu and his family tree in which the story of the marriage of Krishna and Rukminī is but a small part. Therefore, in the case of the Kakawin Hariwangsa, the name is not entirely appropriate because this kakawin only covers a small part of the story outlined in the Harivamśa.

== Contents ==
The Lord Krishna was walking in a garden when he received a visit from the god Narada, who told him that his designated wife, an avatar of the goddess Śrī, was going to descend to earth in the land of Kundina. Krishna, as an avatar of the god Vishnu, must marry her. This avatar of the goddess Sri was called the goddess Rukminī, who would be the daughter of prabu Bhishmaka. However, the royal Jarasanda was about to marry her to the King of Cedi, who was called Lord Cedya.

Thus, Krishna wanted to elope with the goddess Rukminī. One evening before the celebrations for the wedding were held, Krishna went to Kundina and ran away with Rukmini. Guests from many countries had already arrived at the wedding. Lord Bhishmaka was extremely angry, and he immediately held discussions with the other visiting kings. They were scared to confront Krishna as he was known to have magical powers. Then Jarasanda developed a strategy to fight him, that is to enlist the assistance of Yudistira and the other Pandava.

A messenger was then sent to Lord Yudistira, who was quite confused. On the one hand, he had the obligation to a noble knight to protect the earth and fight evil. Krishna was a close friend of the Pandava, however his actions were wrong and had to be punished. Finally he agreed to help Jarasanda. Nevertheless, Bhima was furious and wished to murder Jarasanda's messenger, but was prevented by Arjuna. A short while later, they received a visit from an ambassador from Krishna asking their help. Because they had already promised their help to Jarasanda, Yudistira was forced to turn down the request while telling the ambassador that Krishna had no need to worry because of his divine powers.

The five Pandava then left for the land of Karawira, where Lord Jarasanda ruled, and then all the Kaurava invaded Dwarawati, Krishna's country.

Meanwhile, Krishna was preparing to face his enemies, helped by his older brother, Baladewa. The two of them defeated many enemies. Jarasanda, the Kaurava, Bima and Nakula and Sahadewa were all slain. Yudistira was rendered unconscious by Krishna and couldn't move. Then Krishna was challenged by Arjuna and nearly lost, and thus the god Vishnu descended from heaven. Krishna, as an avatar of Vishnu turned into Vishnu, while Arjuna, who was also an avatar of Vishnu, also turned into Vishnu. Yudistira then became conscious again, and asked Vishnu to bring back to life all those who had been slain in the fighting. Vishnu agreed, and He rained down immortality and all those who had been slain came back to life, including Jarasanda. They all then joined the festivities for Krishna's wedding in Dwarawati.

== Author ==
Kakawin Hariwangsa was written by mpu Panuluh while King Jayabaya ruled in Kediri from 1135 to 1179. Panuluh also finished the Bharatayuddha that Sedah started in 1157.

== Themes ==
The themes discussed in the Kakawin Hariwangsa are similar to those in the Kakawin Kresnâyana. Experts in Old Javanese literature are of the opinion that the kakawin Hariwangsa was more successful in its execution of the themes that occur in both works. The kakawin Hariwangsa is simpler than the Kresnayana, so it is possible that mpu Panuluh re-composed an existing story for unknown purposes. There is also the possibility that he was requested to compose the story by Lord Jayabaya or indeed did so just because he wished to. In the kakawin itself, it is written that mpu Panuluh wrote it because: "tambenya pangiketkw apét laleh", which means "the reason for composing this story is to seek success." This is taken by ancient Javanese literature experts to mean that this kakawin is only a draft. Mpu Panuluh is also known for the Kakawin Bharatayuddha which he wrote with mpu Sedah.

There are also several things in the kakawin that are both awkward and interesting, for instance, how the Pandava were able to be wounded fighting Krishna, while their allies in the story were the Kaurava, who were actually hereditary enemies of the Pandava. Indeed, everything ends well for all parties, something which generally does not happen in Indian epic literature, and this is an indication of an "Indonesianisation" of this kakawin. Indeed, there are experts who believe that this kakawin is in truth a script intended specifically for a Wayang performance.
