= Śiwarātrikalpa =

Old Javanese poem

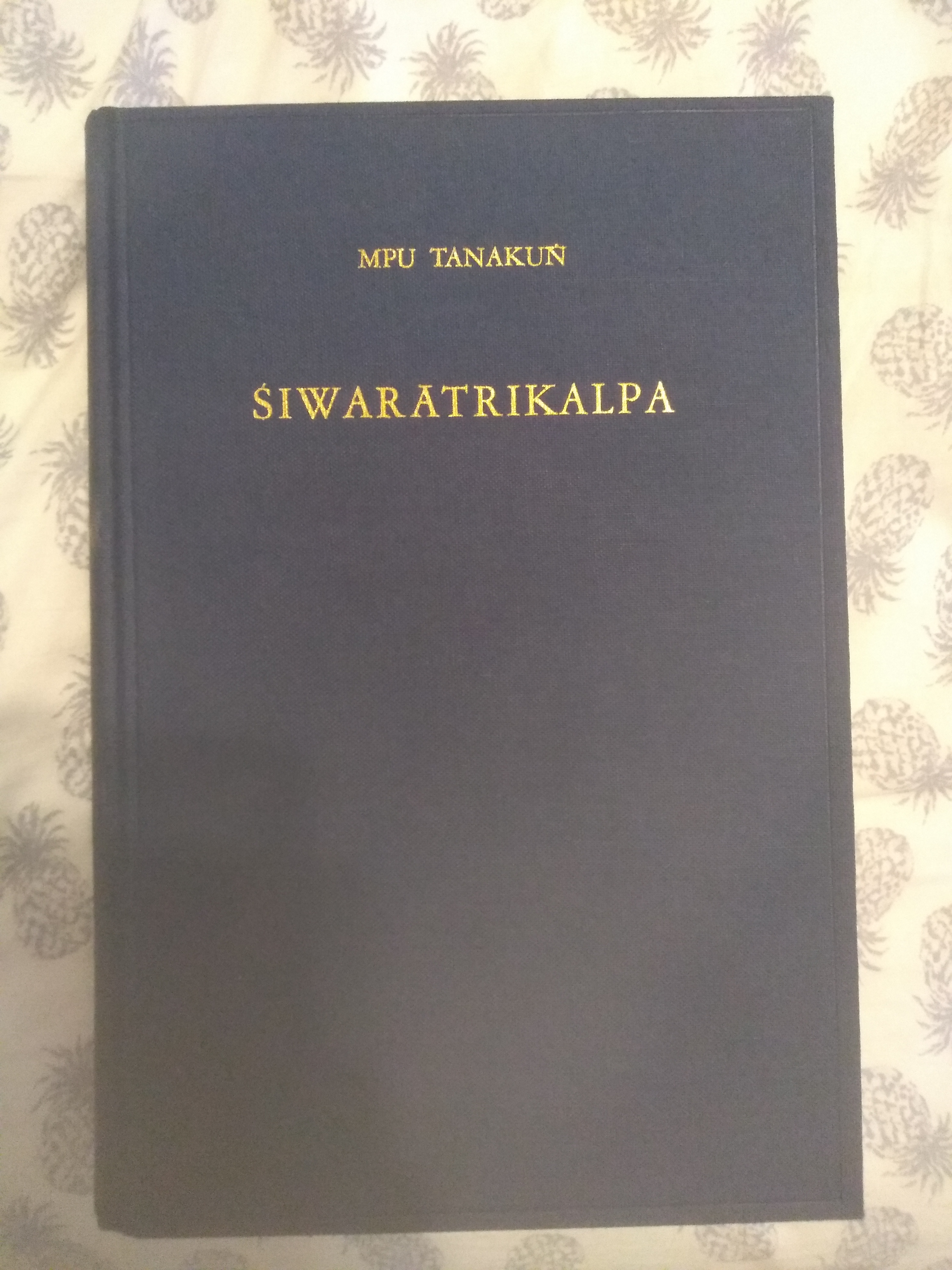
A copy of A. Teeuw's translation of Śiwarātrikalpa by Mpu Tanakung

Śiwarātrikalpa (from Śiwarātri, meaning Shiva's night, and kalpa, meaning ritual), also known as the Kakawin Lubdhaka, is an Old Javanese Hindu kakawin text written by Mpu Tanakung. This text aimed to spread the observance of Maha Shivaratri from the Vijayanagara Empire, who had given a great impetus to the revival of Saivite Hinduism, to the Hindus of Indonesia. It is believed to have been composed about 600 years ago, between 1466 and 1478, at a point when the Saivism sect of Hinduism dominated Java. Scholars have theorized that this revivalist zeal in Java was the result of the emerging Malacca Sultanate, through which Islam had been making gains in Java, and Indonesia in general.

It is a didactic text that describes the making of the rite of Shiva on Maha Shivaratri, celebrated by Hindus all over Indonesia, especially in Bali. The story is related to some Puranas.

== Summary ==
The Śiwarātrikalpa follows a hunter, named Lubhdaka who does not follow Dharma. Since Lubhdaka kills animals and doesn't follow dharma, he would not be entered into heaven according to the principles of the book. During a hunt, Lubhdaka inadvertently completes the rite of Shiva on the Śiwarātrikalpa. After a life of never practicing dharma, the hunter catches a deadly disease and on his deathbed cries for the wife and children he would leave behind. Shiva sees Lubhdaka and takes pity on him, telling his servants to bring Lubhdaka to Shiva's abode. When his servants ask why, Shiva responds that in the hunter's life, he completed the Rite of Shiva which is a meritorious vow in the eyes of Shiva. Yama wanting Lubhdaka's soul to enter hell sends his Ganas to take him and subdue his soul to hell. As the two armies of Shiva and Yama meet, they battle and Shiva is victorious. Therefore Lubhdaka's soul is brought to heaven.

== Effects of the Rite of Shiva and Its Current Practice ==
According to the Śiwarātrikalpa, the rite of Shiva not only cleanses one of their sins but also brings them good fortune and blesses their life. The rite of Shiva is still practiced today, especially in Bali.
