= Javanese poetry =

Javanese verse accompanied by traditional music

Javanese poetry (poetry in the Javanese or especially the Kawi language; Low Javanese: tembang; High Javanese: sekar) is traditionally recited in song form. The standard forms are divided into three types, sekar ageng, sekar madya, and sekar macapat, also common with the ngoko terms: tembang gedhé, tembang tengahan, and tembang macapat. All three types follow strict rules of poetic construction. These forms are highly influential in Javanese gamelan.

== Sekar ageng ==
The most sacred are the sekar ageng (Low Javanese: tembang gedhé; "great songs"). These were traditionally held to be the most ancient of the forms, but Jaap Kunst believed that the indigenous forms represented an older tradition. The ancient forms of these, known as kakawin, use meters from Indian poetry, specifying the number of syllables in each line, their vowel length, and the location of caesurae. Exactly how this ancient form sounded when sung is hard to know, as the modern form has been influenced by gamelan structures. It may have resembled modern Indian or Balinese chant.

The modern form of sekar ageng are always in stanzas of four lines, and the number of syllables in each (lampah) is fixed and divided into parts (pedhotan) by caesurae. (Vowel length is no longer distinguished.) These indications are ordinarily indicated with the form; for example, sekar ageng Bongsa patra, lampah 17, pedhotan 4,6,7. According to Padmasasustra, there are 44 types of sekar ageng used in Surakarta.

A sekar ageng is sometimes used as a type of buka (song introduction) known as a bawa. It is sung solo, or may be supported by the gendér. Only the first line is used in the introduction, and the rest may follow in the actual gendhing. Martopangrawit believes that this began only in the late 19th century, at the time of Paku Buwana IX (r. 1861-93).

== Sekar madya and tembang macapat ==
Sekar madya (Low Javanese: Tembang tengahan; "middle songs") are supposed to lie between the other two genres, but there is no agreement about which genres are considered sekar madya and which are tembang macapat (old orthography: machapat). Both of these, in contrast to sekar ageng, use varying number of lines of varying length, but always in a specific form. Furthermore, the vowel sound of the final syllable must match a specific pattern (note that this is different from syllable rime, as consonants that follow, if any, do not have to match). The pattern of the length of lines is known as guru wilangan, guru pètungan, or guru wichalan, while the pattern of vowels is known as dhongdhing or guru lagu. In the schemes below, the number represents the guru wilangan, while the letter is the guru lagu of the corresponding line.

In addition to these formal structures, each of these forms has a specific mood. The typical use is indicated after the form for many of the structures below.

Padmasoesastra listed 11 types of sekar madya forms used in Surakarta. Many of them, however, are no longer used. The ones in modern use are:

- Juru demung: 8A, 8U, 8U, 8A, 8U, 8A, 8U
- Wirangrong: 8I, 8O, 10U, 6I, 7A, 8A
- Balabak: 12A, 3É, 12A, 3Á, 12A, 3Á

Two meters were classified as macapat forms in the past, but are now considered sekar madya:

- Megatruh (or Duduk wuluh): 12U, 8I, 8U, 8I, 8O
- Gambuh: 7U, 10U, 12I, 8U, 8O (there are a number of variants of this form)

The common macapat forms are:

- Dhandhang gula: 10I, 10A, 8É(O), 7U, 9I, 7A, 6U, 8A, 12I, 7A; neutral character, used especially for introducing another poem
- Sinom: 8A, 8I, 8A, 8I, 7I, 8U, 7A, 8I, 12A; didactic poems
- Asmarandana: 8I, 8A, 8O(É), 8A, 7A, 8U, 8A; love poems
- Kinanthi: 8U, 8I, 8A, 8I, 8A, 8I; love poems
- Pangkur: 8A, 11I, 8U, 7A, 12U, 8A, 8I; violent passions or fighting
- Durma: 12A, 7I, 6A, 7A, 8I, 5A, 7I; violent passions or fighting
- Mijil: 10I, 6O, 10É, 10I, 6I, 6U; love poems
- Mas kumambang: 12I, 6A, 8I, 8A; longing or homesickness
- Pucung: 12U, 6A, 8I, 12A; neutral character, used for riddles

As an example, consider the following Kinanthi verse, a stanza from the Serat Centhini:

Ki Jayèngraga agupuh
anggamel rebab respati
rebabé langkung prayoga
watangan pinonthang gadhing
kosok pinatra pinrada
batok jamangan balenggin

These forms are the basis of kidung poetry.

The text for these songs is frequently used in works for the gamelan, frequently sung by the gerong. Indeed, many modern gendhing share common macapat texts, especially Kinanthi, fit into their individual melodic pattern. Sumarsam believes that the singing of these forms led to the development of the early gendhing gerong, in the mid-19th century. Wayang performances make use of the Mahabharata and Ramayana in macapat form, created in the 18th and 19th centuries.
