= Mpu Sedah =

Indonesian poet

Mpu Sedah was a Javanese literary poet who wrote Kakawin Bhāratayuddha in Old Javanese. He lived during the Jayabaya reign of the Kadiri or Panjalu Kingdom in East Java. Mpu Sedah is one of Raja Jayabaya's advisers. Mpu Sedah also had an adopted son, Aria Wiraraja, a military adviser to Raden Wijaya. According to Mpu Panuluh, Sedah was a famed author at the time, although not much is known of his life today.

For unknown reasons, Mpu Sedah was unable to complete the Kakawin Bhāratayuddha and the remainder was written by Mpu Panuluh.
