= Unity in diversity =

Expression of harmony and unity between dissimilar individuals or groups

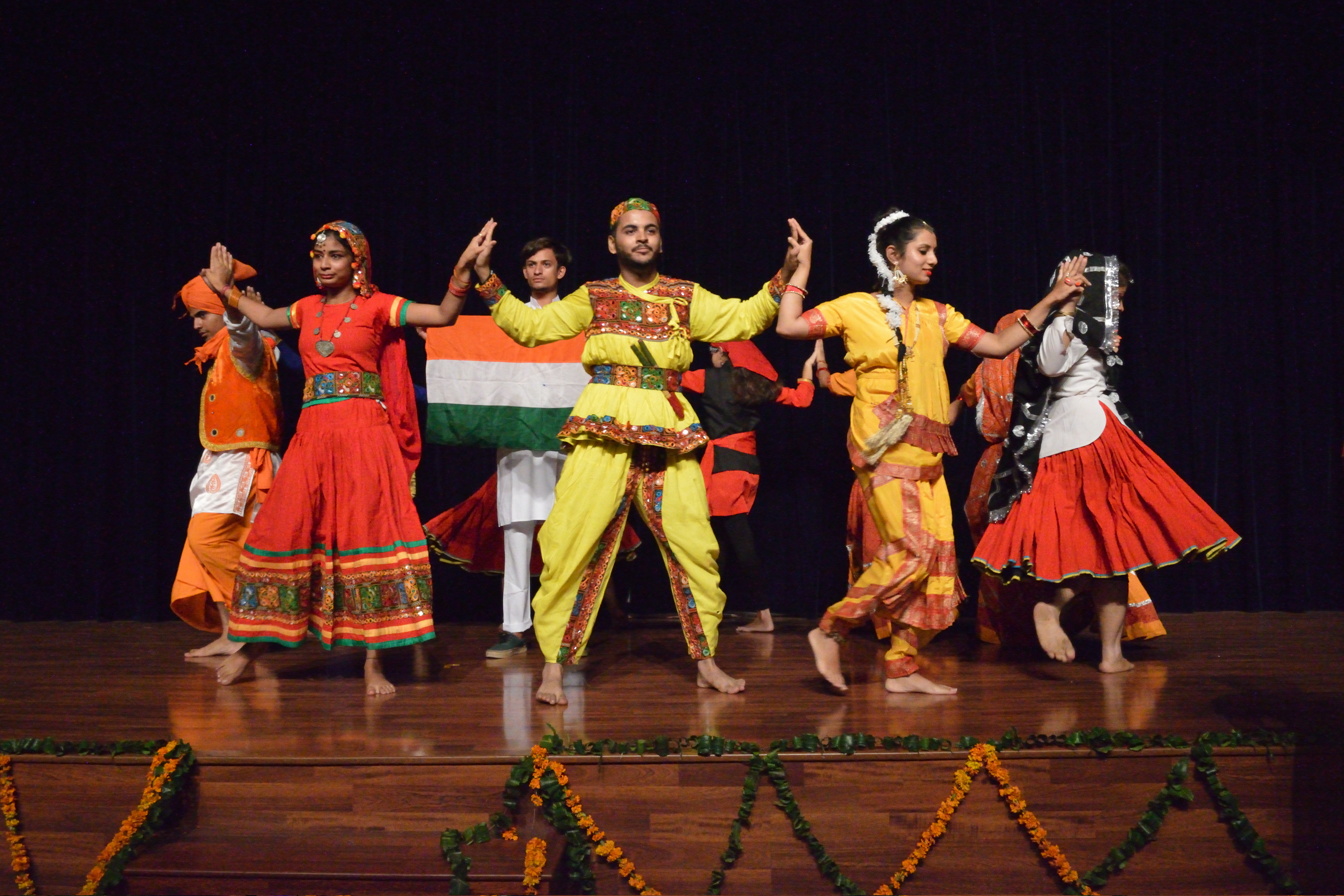
Participants at WikiConference India 2016 performing a dance entitled "Unity in Diversity".

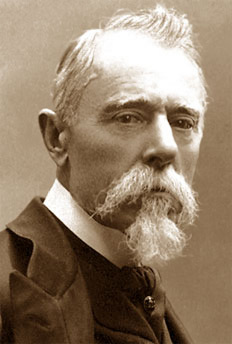
Italian Nobel peace prize winner Ernesto Teodoro Moneta first adopted the motto In Varietate Concordia/In Varietate Unitas.

Unity in diversity is used as an expression of harmony and unity between dissimilar individuals or groups. It is a concept of "unity without uniformity and diversity without fragmentation" that shifts focus from unity based on a mere tolerance of physical, cultural, linguistic, social, religious, political, ideological and/or psychological differences towards a more complex unity based on an understanding that difference enriches human interactions. The idea and related phrase is very old and dates back to ancient times in both Western and Eastern Old World cultures. It has applications in many fields, including ecology, cosmology, philosophy, religion and politics.

== Origin and further inspiration ==
The Rig Veda, dating back thousands of years, provides fundamental insight and inspiration regarding "unity in diversity". "Ekam Sat Vipra Bahudha Vadanti" is derived from Rig Veda 1.164.46, highlighting the unity of existence despite its diverse manifestations. It translates to, "Truth is One, though the sages speak of it in diverse ways".

The acceptance of various paths to truth, as articulated in "Ekam Sat", aligns with the ethos of Vasudhaiva Kutumbakam, "The world is one family", which does not impose singular beliefs but rather embraces multiple ways of understanding the divine and the universe.

Consistent with the concept of "unity in diversity", Sufi philosopher Ibn al-'Arabi (1165–1240) who too reflected on this ancient metaphysical concept of the "oneness of being" (wahdat al-wujud), namely that reality is one and that God's is the only true existence; all other beings are merely shadows or reflections of God's qualities. Abd al-Karīm al-Jīlī (1366–1424) expanded on Al-'Arabi's work, using it to describe a holistic view of the universe which reflects "unity in diversity and diversity in unity" (al-wahdah fi'l-kathrah wa'l-kathrah fi'l-wahdah).

Leibniz used the phrase as a definition of "harmony" (Harmonia est unitas in varietate) in his Elementa verae pietatis, sive de amore dei 948 I.12/A VI.4.1358. Leibniz glosses the definition Harmonia est cum multa ad quandam unitatem revocantur which means the 'Harmony' is when many [things] are restored to some kind unity.

Swami Vivekananda once emphasized that India's spiritual heritage taught the world two invaluable virtues: tolerance and universal acceptance. Throughout history, India has welcomed and nurtured a multitude of philosophical and ideological streams. It has provided a fertile ground for these diverse schools of thought to flourish, drawing inspiration from their rich reservoirs of ideas. India's openness to assimilating wisdom, not just from within but also from distant lands, echoes the ancient wisdom of the Upanishads: 'Accept all noble thoughts coming from all sides.'

== Religious beliefs ==
The Old Javanese poem Kakawin Sutasoma, written by Mpu Tantular during the reign of the Majapahit empire sometime in the 14th century, contains the phrase Bhinneka Tunggal Ika, translated as "unity in diversity". The poem is notable as it promotes tolerance between Hindus (especially Shaivites) and Buddhists, stating that although Buddha and Shiva are different in substance, their truths are one:

It is said that the well-known Buddha and Shiva are two different substances.
They are indeed different, yet how is it possible to recognise their difference in a glance,
since the truth of Jina (Buddha) and the truth of Shiva is one.
They are indeed different, but they are of the same kind, as there is no duality in Truth.

Unity in diversity is a prominent principle of the Baháʼí Faith. In 1938, in his book The World Order of Baháʼu'lláh, Shoghi Effendi, the Guardian of the Baháʼí Faith, said that "unity in diversity" was the "watchword" for the religion.

ʻAbdu'l-Bahá, the head of the Baháʼí Faith from 1892 to 1921, explained this principle in terms of the oneness of humanity:

In reality all are members of one human family—children of one Heavenly Father. Humanity may be likened unto the vari-colored flowers of one garden. There is unity in diversity. Each sets off and enhances the other's beauty.

In Indian spiritual teacher Meher Baba's Final Declaration, he stated that "Unity in the midst of diversity can be made to be felt only by touching the very core of the heart. This is the work for which I have come. I have come to sow the seed of love in your hearts so that, in spite of all superficial diversity which your life in illusion must experience and endure, the feeling of oneness through love is brought about amongst all the nations, creeds, sects and castes of the world."

Unity in diversity is also a slogan utilized by the disciples of Swami Sivananda. They came to America to spread the true meaning of Unity in Diversity; that we are All in One & One in All in an all loving ahimsa God.

Dutch Christian theologian Herman Bavinck wrote that principles of "unity in diversity" and "diversity in unity" both flow out of the Christian doctrines of the Imago Dei and the Trinity:

Every human being, while a member of the body of humanity as a whole, is at the same time a unique idea of God, with a significance and destiny that is eternal! Every human being is himself or herself an image of God, yet that image is only fully unfolded in humanity as a whole!

— Reformed Dogmatics: Volume 2 (Gereformeerde Dogmatiek), 1895-99

[The Trinity] reveals God to us as the fullness of being, the true life, eternal beauty. In God, too, there is unity in diversity, diversity in unity.

— Reformed Dogmatics: Volume 2 (Gereformeerde Dogmatiek), 1895-99

== Politics ==
In modern politics it was first used, as In varietate unitas, by Ernesto Teodoro Moneta in the context of the unification of Italy.

=== Canada ===
Adélard Godbout, while Premier of Quebec, published an article entitled "Canada: Unity in Diversity" (1943) in the Council on Foreign Relations journal. He asked,

How does the dual relationship of the French Canadians make them an element of strength and order, and therefore of unity, in our joint civilization, which necessarily includes not only Canada and the British Commonwealth of Nations, but also the United States, the Latin republics of America and liberated France?

The phrase has since become somewhat of a staple of Canadian multiculturalism in general.

The phrase was invoked in the Interdisciplinary Research Seminar (IRS) at Wilfrid Laurier University in the 1970s. Ervin Laszlo presented his paper entitled "Framework for a General Systems Theory of World Order" (1974) as one of the first seminar Papers that led to the establishment of the IRS in 1975.

The motto of the province of Saskatchewan, adopted in 1986, is the variation Multis e gentibus vires (from many peoples, strength). The motto of Canada's most populous city, Toronto, adopted in 1998, is the variation Diversity Our Strength.

=== European Union ===
In 2000, the European Union adopted 'United in Diversity' (Latin: In varietate concordia) as its official motto, a reference to the many and diverse member states of the Union in terms of culture. Apart from its English form, the European Union's motto is also official in 23 other languages. "Unity in diversity" was selected by means of a competition involving students from member nations. According to the European Union official website:

It signifies how Europeans have come together, in the form of the EU, to work for peace and prosperity, while at the same time being enriched by the continent's many different cultures, traditions and languages.

=== India ===
Jawaharlal Nehru, the first Prime Minister of India and leader of the Indian National Congress, vigorously promoted unity in diversity as an ideal essential to national consolidation and progress. He wrote at length on this topic, exploring it in detail in his work The Discovery of India.

The diversity of India is tremendous; it is obvious; it lies on the surface and anybody can see it. It concerns itself with physical appearances as well as with certain mental habits and traits. There is little in common, to outward seeming, between the Pathan of the North-West and the Tamil in the far South. Their racial stocks are not the same, though there may be common strands running through them... Yet, with all these differences, there is no mistaking the impress of India on the Pathan, as this is obvious on the Tamil. The Pathan and the Tamil are two extreme examples; the others lie somewhere in between. All of them have their distinctive features, all of them have still more the distinguishing mark of India.

— The Variety and Unity of India, from The Discovery of India, 1946

Though outwardly there was diversity and infinite variety among our people, everywhere there was that tremendous impress of oneness, which had held all of us together for ages past, whatever political fate or misfortune had befallen us.

— The Search for India, from The Discovery of India, 1946

=== Indigenous peoples ===
The Gwichʼin Tribal Council representing the Gwichʼin, a First Nations of Canada and an Alaskan Native Athabaskan people, who live in the northwestern part of North America, mostly above the Arctic Circle, adopted the motto Unity through Diversity.

=== Indonesia ===
The national emblem of Indonesia, the Garuda Pancasila, has the motto in Old Javanese as seen at the banner held

Bhinneka Tunggal Ika, an Old Javanese phrase translated as "Unity in Diversity", is the official national motto of Indonesia.

=== South Africa ===
When apartheid South Africa celebrated the 20th anniversary of its transformation into a republic on 31 May 1981, the theme of the celebrations was "unity in diversity" (Afrikaans: eenheid in diversiteit). Anti-apartheid campaigners denounced the motto as a cynical attempt to explain away the inequalities in South African life and called on runners of the Comrades Marathon to protest at the co-option of the event by wearing a black armband. The winner of the race, Bruce Fordyce, was one of those wearing a black armband. The term has since been incorporated into the preamble of the 1996 Constitution of South Africa as a central tenet of post-apartheid South Africa and is currently the national motto, as written in the extinct ǀXam language:

ǃke e꞉ ǀxarra ǁke

=== United States ===
E pluribus unum is the traditional motto of the United States, a Latin phrase meaning "out of many one." The phrase was chosen by Pierre Eugene du Simitiere to represent the diverse Thirteen Colonies finding strength through unification as the United States of America.

== See also ==
- Bhinneka Tunggal Ika
- Cultural diversity
- Just society
- Unity of opposites
- Unus pro omnibus, omnes pro uno
