= Rubric (disambiguation) =

A rubric is a word or section of text in red for emphasis.

Rubric may also refer to:

- Rubric (academic), a set of criteria for grading assignments
- Rubric (translation organisation), a global language service provider

== See also ==
- Rubik (disambiguation)
