= Bhinneka Tunggal Ika =

Indonesian national motto

Bhinneka Tunggal Ika included in the National emblem of Indonesia, the Garuda Pancasila

Bhinneka Tunggal Ika is the official national motto of Indonesia. It is inscribed in the national emblem of Indonesia, the Garuda Pancasila, written on the scroll gripped by the Garuda's claws. The phrase comes from Old Javanese, meaning "Unity in Diversity", and is enshrined in article 36A of the Constitution of Indonesia. The motto refers to the unity and integrity of Indonesia, a nation consisting of various cultures, regional languages, races, ethnicities, religions, and beliefs.

The phrase is a quotation from an Old Javanese poem Kakawin Sutasoma, written by Mpu Tantular, a famous poet of Javanese literature during the reign of the Majapahit empire in the 14th century, under the reign of King Rājasanagara (also known as Hayam Wuruk).

== Meaning ==
Translated word for word, bhinnêka is a sandhi form of bhinna meaning "different"; the word tunggal means "one" and the word ika means "it". Literally, Bhinneka Tunggal Ika is translated as "It is different, [yet] it is one" or "one out of many". Conventionally, the phrase is translated as "Unity in Diversity", which means that despite being diverse, the Indonesian people are still one unit. This motto describes the unity and integrity of Indonesia, which consists of various cultures, regional languages, races, ethnicities, religions, and beliefs. As head of the Faculty of Philosophy of Gadjah Mada University, Rizal Mustansyir, writes, "the motto of Bhinneka Tunggal Ika explains clearly that there is diversity in various aspects of life that makes the Indonesian nation a unified nation".

== History ==
=== Origins ===
The phrase originated from the Old Javanese poem Kakawin Sutasoma, written by Mpu Tantular a famous poet of Javanese Literature during the reign of the Majapahit empire sometime in the 14th century, under the reign of King Rājasanagara, also known as Hayam Wuruk. The Kakawin contains epic poems written in metres. The poem is notable as it promotes tolerance between Hindus (especially Shivaites) and Buddhists.

=== Adoption ===
The phrase Bhinneka Tunggal Ika was published in an article entitled Verspreide Geschriften which was written by a Dutch linguist orientalist Johan Hendrik Casper Kern. Kern's writings were later read by Mohammad Yamin, who then brought the phrase to the first Investigating Committee for Preparatory Work for Independence (BPUPK) session, between 29 May to 1 June 1945.

The motto Bhinneka Tunggal Ika was later incorporated into the state emblem, the Garuda Pancasila. Reporting from the Directorate General of Culture of the Republic of Indonesia, the state symbol was designed by Sultan Hamid II and announced to the public on 15 February 1950.

The phrase, along with Pancasila as national emblem and 20 other articles, is officially included into the Constitution of Indonesia after the second amendment of the constitution was ratified on People's Consultative Assembly (MPR) parliamentary session in 7–18 August 2000.

== Full stanza ==
=== Original ===
This quotation comes from Canto 139, stanza 5. The full stanza reads as follows:

Rwāneka dhātu winuwus Buddha Wiswa,
Bhinnêki rakwa ring apan kena parwanosen,
Mangka ng Jinatwa kalawan Śiwatatwa tunggal,
Bhinnêka tunggal ika tan hana dharma mangrwa.

=== Translation ===
It is said that the well-known Buddha and Shiva are two different substances.
They are indeed different, yet how is it possible to recognise their difference in a glance,
since the truth of Jina (Buddha) and the truth of Shiva is one.
They are indeed different, but they are of the same kind, as there is no duality in Truth.

This translation is based, with minor adaptations, on the critical text edition by Soewito Santoso.

== Other sources ==
This idea is a constant theme throughout Mpu Tantular's writings and can also be found in his other writing, the Kakawin Arjunawijaya, canto 27 stanza 2:

=== Original ===
ndan kantênanya, haji, tan hana bheda saṅ hyaṅ
hyaṅ Buddha rakwa kalawan Śiwarājadewa
kālih samêka sira saṅ pinakeṣṭi dharma
riṅ dharma sīma tuwi yan lêpas adwitīya

=== Translation ===
Clearly then, Your Majesty, there is no distinction between the Deities:
the hyaṅ Buddha and Siwa, the lord of gods,
both are the same, they are the goals of the religions;
in the dharma sīma as well as in the dharma lêpas they are second to none.

== See also ==
- E pluribus unum, national motto of the United States of America, which has a similar meaning.
- National motto
- National emblem of Indonesia
- The 2018 Asian Games' official mascots, Bhin Bhin, Atung, and Kaka, which are named after the motto.
