= WikiConference =

WikiConference or Wiki Conference may refer to:

- WikiConference North America, an official user group and annual Wikimedia conference dedicated to projects and volunteers in North America
- WikiConference India, a national Wikipedia conference organized in India
- WikiCon, an annual convention of German-speaking communities of Wikimedia projects
- WikiConference Kerala, an official user group and annual Wikimedia conference dedicated to projects and volunteers in Kerala.

== See also ==
- Wikipedia:WikiCon
