= National emblem of Indonesia =

National emblem of Indonesia Garuda Pancasila
- Armiger: Republic of Indonesia as well as the following institutions: President of Indonesia; Vice President of Indonesia; People's Consultative Assembly; Regional Representative Council; House of Representatives; Judiciary of Indonesia; Audit Board of Indonesia; Members of the Cabinet of Indonesia, including ministers; Heads of Indonesian diplomatic missions (ambassadors, consuls, etc); All provincial governors, regents, and mayors; Indonesian civil law notaries
- Adopted: 11 February 1950
- Shield: An escutcheon representing the national ideology Pancasila ("The Five Principles"): Quarterly Gules and Argent (national colours), parted per fess by a thick line Sable (symbolising the Equator); in the 1st quarter a banteng (Javanese wild bull) cabossed proper (for the 4th Principle), in the 2nd quarter a banyan tree proper (for the 3rd Principle), in the 3rd quarter a sprig each of paddy and cotton both proper (for the 5th Principle), in the 4th quarter a ring of annulets and mascles chain Or (for the 2nd Principle); on an inescutcheon, Sable a mullet Or (for the 1st Principle).
- Supporters: Garuda (a Javan hawk-eagle) displayed Or, clutching a scroll Argent of national motto
- Motto: Bhinneka Tunggal Ika (Old Javanese for 'Unity in Diversity')
- Other elements: The feathers of the Garuda are arranged to represent the date 17 August 1945, the day on which Indonesia's independence was proclaimed.

The national emblem of Indonesia is called Garuda Pancasila. The main part is the Garuda with a heraldic shield on its chest and a scroll gripped by its legs. The shield's five emblems represent Pancasila, the five principles of Indonesia's national ideology. The Garuda claws gripping a white ribbon scroll inscribed with the national motto Bhinneka Tunggal Ika written in black text, which can be loosely translated as "Unity in Diversity". Garuda Pancasila was designed by Sultan Hamid II from Pontianak, supervised by Sukarno, and was adopted as the national emblem on 11 February 1950.

== History ==
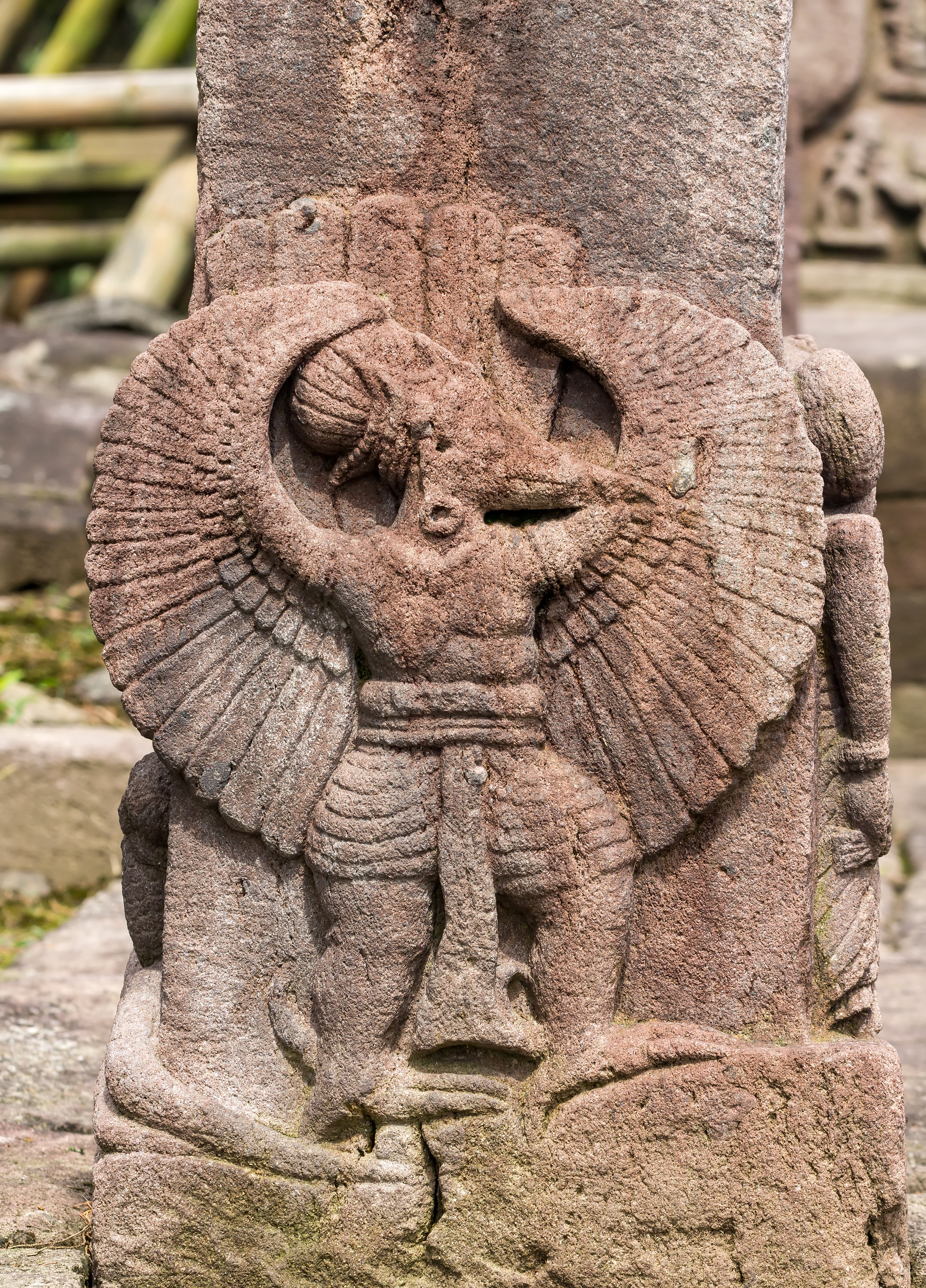
Bas-relief of Sukuh temple in Central Java

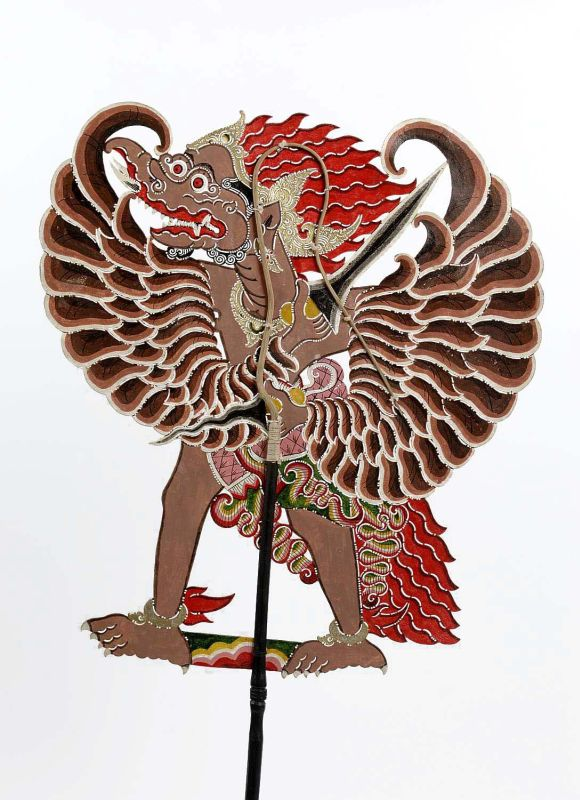
Character of Garuda in Wayang performance

Garuda, the discipled carrier or vehicle (vahana) of the Hindu god Vishnu, appears in many ancient Hindu-Buddhist temples of ancient Indonesia. Temples such as Mendut, Borobudur, Sajiwan, Prambanan, Kidal, Penataran, Belahan, and Sukuh depict the images (bas-relief or statue) of Garuda. In Prambanan temple complex, there is a single temple located in front of Vishnu temple, dedicated to Garuda. However, there is no statue of Garuda inside the chamber today. In the Shiva temple, also in Prambanan complex, there is a relief telling an episode of Ramayana about Garuda's nephew who also belongs to the bird-god race, Jatayu, tried to rescue Sita from Ravana's hand. The deified statue of King Airlangga depicted as Vishnu mounting Garuda from Belahan, probably the most famous statue of Garuda from ancient Java. Now the statue is one of the important collection of Trowulan Museum.

Garuda appear in many traditions and stories, especially in Java and Bali. In many stories Garuda symbolises the virtue of knowledge, power, bravery, loyalty, and discipline. As the vehicle of Vishnu, Garuda also bears the attributes of Vishnu, which symbolise preservation of cosmic order. Balinese tradition venerated Garuda as "the lord of all flying creatures", and "the majestic king of birds". In Bali, Garuda traditionally portrayed as a divine creature with head, beak, wings, and claw of an eagle, while has the body of a human. Usually portrayed in intricate carving with golden and vivid colours, as the vehicle of Vishnu or in battle scene against Nāga (dragon) serpents. The important and noble position of Garuda in Indonesian tradition since ancient times has venerated Garuda as the national symbol of Indonesia, the embodiment of Indonesian ideology, Pancasila. Garuda also chosen as the name of Indonesian national airlines, Garuda Indonesia.

After the Indonesian National Revolution ended and followed by the Dutch acknowledgement of the Indonesian independence in 1949, there was a need to create a national emblem of United States of Indonesia. On 10 January 1950 the Committee of State Seal was formed, under co-ordination of Sultan Hamid II of Pontianak as the State Minister of No Portfolio, with Muhammad Yamin as the chairman, and Ki Hajar Dewantara, M. A. Melkias Agustinus Pellaupessy, Mohammad Natsir, and Raden Mas Ngabehi Poerbatjaraka as committee members. The committee task is to select the proposals of United States of Indonesia national emblem to be presented to the government.

According to Mohammad Hatta, in his memoire "Bung Hatta Menjawab", to fulfill the mandate of the Cabinet, Minister Priyono launched the design competition. After the competition was held, there were two proposed designs selected as the finalists; one was the work of Sultan Hamid II and the other one was the work of Muhammad Yamin. The design proposed by Sultan Hamid II was accepted by both the People's Consultative Assembly (DPR) and the government, while Yamin's design was rejected because it featured shining sun emblem that seemed to be influenced by the Japanese Empire flag. Sukarno as The President of United States of Indonesia together with Mohammad Hatta as the Prime Minister, asked Sultan Hamid II to change the red and white ribbon being held by the Garuda talons to a white scroll bearing the national motto "Bhinneka Tunggal Ika". On 8 February 1950, the design created by Sultan Hamid II was presented to President Sukarno. The design featured the Garuda in its anthropomorphic form, similar to the traditional depiction in ancient Javanese, Balinese, and Siamese art. However, the Islamic party Masyumi expressed their objection and stated that the bird with human neck and shoulders with both hands holding the Pancasila shield was too mythical.

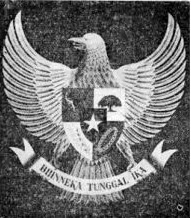
The Garuda Pancasila adopted on 11 February 1950, still without crest and with different position of talons.

Sultan Hamid II edited his design and proposed the new version, this time discarding the anthropomorphic form, the eagle-like Garuda was done in stylised naturalistic style and named Rajawali (eagle) Garuda Pancasila. President Sukarno presented this design to the cabinet and Prime Minister Hatta. According to AG Pringgodigdo in his book "Sekitar Pancasila" published by the Minister of Defence and Security, the improved design of Garuda Pancasila by Sultan Hamid II was officially adopted in United States of Indonesia Cabinet Assembly on 11 February 1950. At that time, the Rajawali Garuda Pancasila was still "bald" without crest crowning its head like current version. President Sukarno introduced the national emblem of Indonesia to the public at Hotel Des Indes, Jakarta, on 15 February 1950.

Sukarno continued to improve the design of Garuda Pancasila. On 20 March 1950, Sukarno ordered the palace artist Dullah to make several improvements according to his suggestions, such as the addition of a crest and the change of talons position to the scroll. It was believed that Sukarno suggested the crest addition because the "bald" Garuda was considered too similar to the bald eagle in the United States Great Seal.

== Scroll and motto ==
The Garuda clutches in its talons a scroll bearing the National Motto of Indonesia, "Bhinneka Tunggal Ika" which is an Old Javanese stanza of the epic poem "Sutasoma" attributed to the 14th-century poet sage of the Javanese Majapahit Empire, Empu Tantular. The text was redesicovered by the Dutch scholar Brandes from among the many lontar manuscripts among the Dutch booty called the Lombok treasure — looted from the destroyed Lombok palace in 1894. who is said to have committed the phrase to writing for the first time.

The poem expounded a doctrine of reconciliation between the Hindu and Buddhist faiths: meaning literally "Although diverse, both truthful to Dharma — thus there exists no duality in Truth". This spirit of religious tolerance was an essential element in the foundation and security of the newly emerging State of Majapahit and the thus fledging Republic of Indonesia. It is roughly rendered, Diverse, yet united or perhaps more poetically in English: Unity in Diversity. The official Indonesian language translation is: Berbeda-beda namun tetap satu jua.

== Uses ==
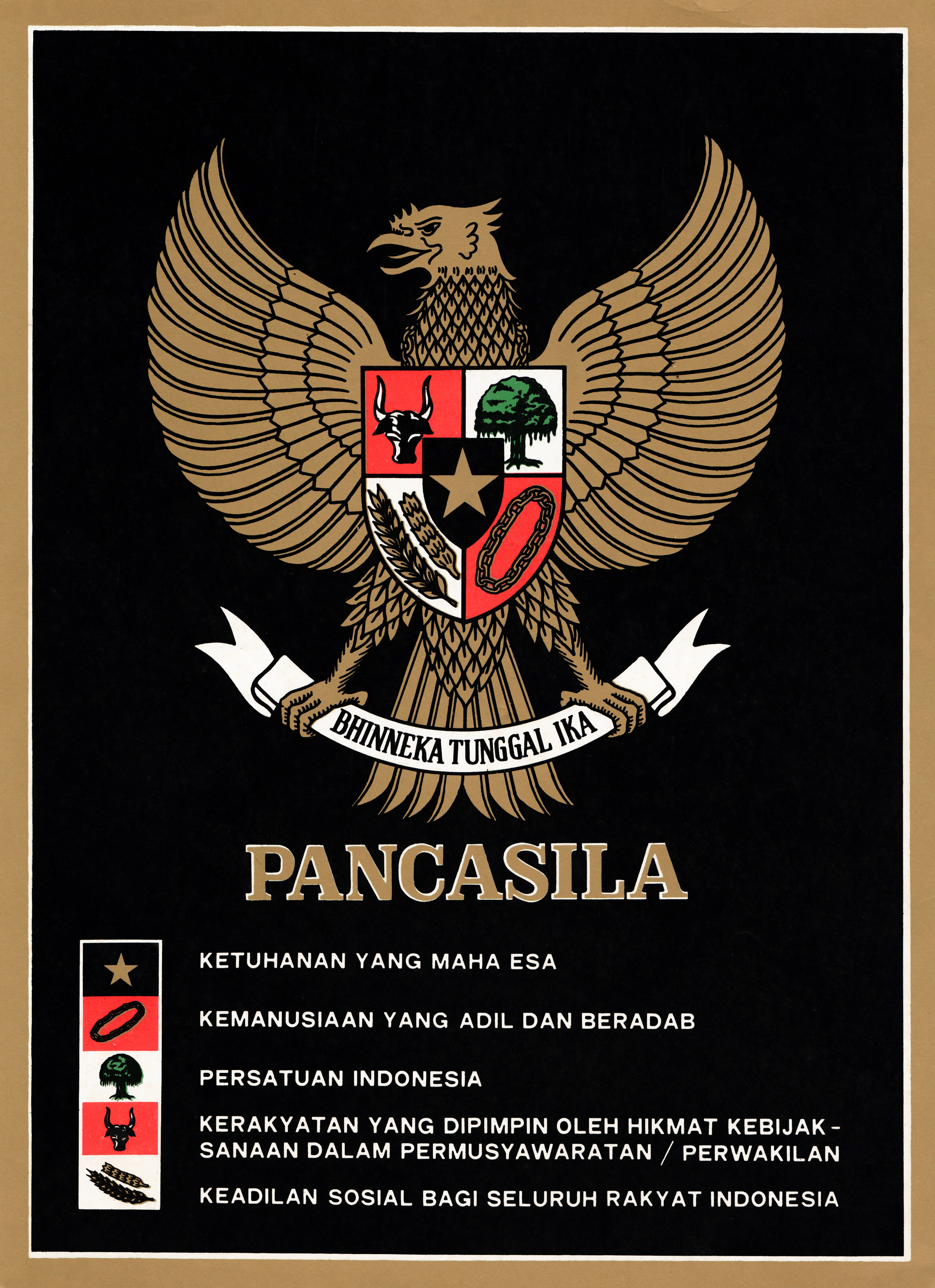
A depiction of the Garuda Pancasila on a c. 1987 poster; each tenet of the Pancasila is written beside its symbol.

The National Emblem is used to symbolize Indonesian government and as official emblem of Indonesian ministries, departments and institutions. It is commonly displayed in Indonesian state palaces, monuments, government offices, buildings and also Indonesian embassies abroad. It is also used in private offices and buildings, also in the classes of public schools, placed on the wall slightly upper than the President's and Vice-President's photographs that flanked the emblem. Also, it is used on the front of every Naval vessel, denoting governmental status of the vessel. Moreover, every governor and head of cities or regencies wears the National Emblem on their headgear's badge. The President uses it on every plane he/she travelled with. Every Ministry, Provincial, Military and Police flag also uses it on one side.

The Indonesian National Emblem is used as part of governmental institutions' and organisations' emblems. Such as being included within the emblems of Corruption Eradication Commission (KPK), General Elections Commission (KPU), People's Representative Council (DPR), and Regional Representative Council (DPD).

In sports, many sport branches uses the National Emblem as their uniform insignia, such as football, creating the nickname for the Indonesia national football team as the "Garuda Team".

However, some elements of Garuda Pancasila is used in some on non-national and non-governmental organisation. For example, the Great Indonesia Movement Party (Gerindra) used the head of Garuda Pancasila as the main part of their symbol. The rallying symbol of Prabowo Subianto's 2014 presidential campaign also used the Garuda Merah (red Garuda), a red silhouette of Garuda Pancasila, which raised the controversy and protest whether a partisan non-governmental organisations should be allowed on using the national emblem as rallying symbol. The controversy also raised from pro-Prabowo musician Ahmad Dhani who campaigned through a music video that displays golden Garuda Pancasila — which looks like the German imperial eagle, in aesthetic imagery reminiscent of Nazi's style fascism. The red Garuda is again used as part of Prabowo's campaign for presidency in the 2019 election.

== Symbolism ==
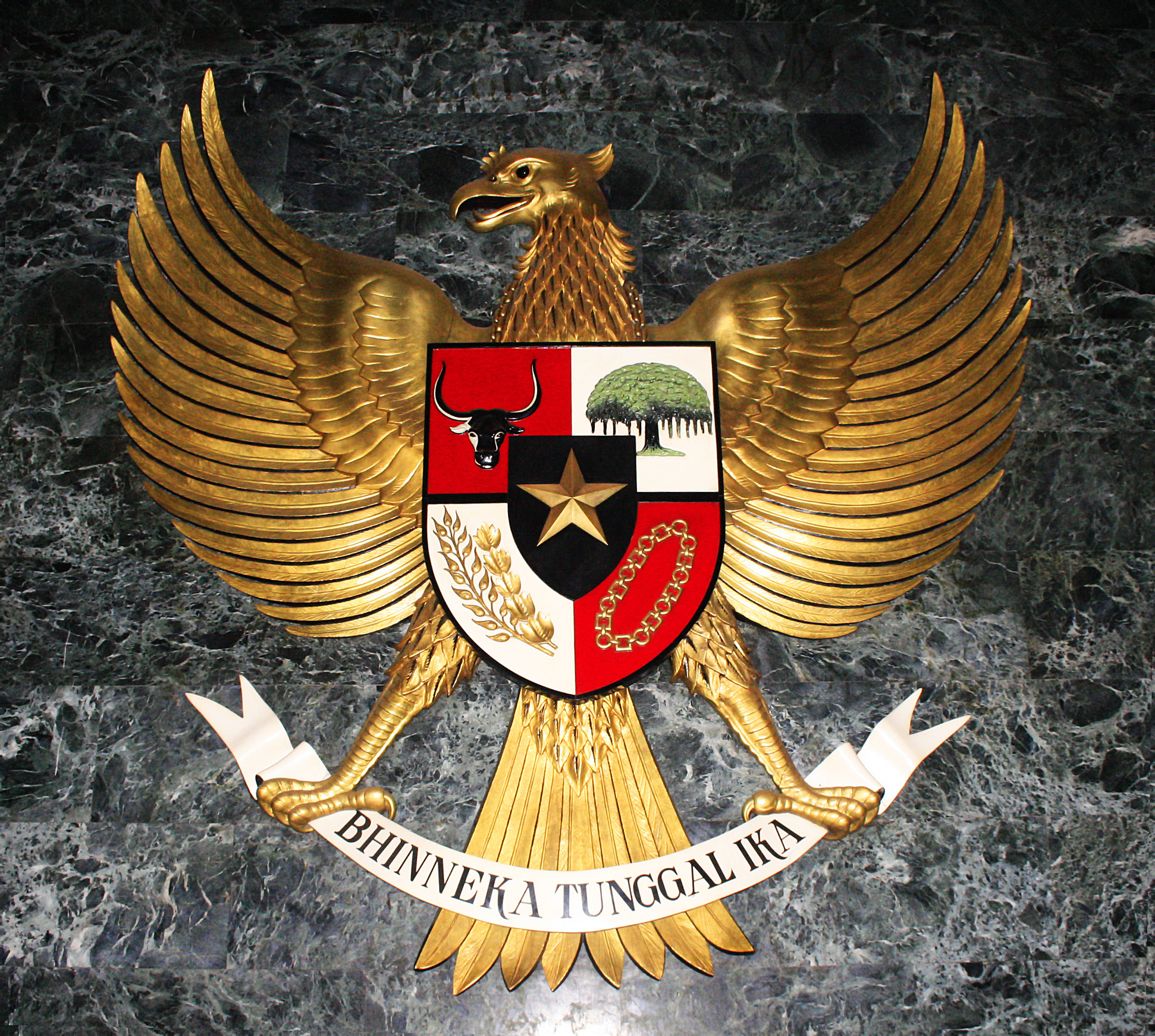
The statue of Garuda Pancasila displayed in the Ruang Kemerdekaan (Independence Room) at the National Monument (Monas), Jakarta.

=== Garuda ===
The Garuda is the golden eagle, common to both Hinduism and Buddhism. The Garuda has the wings, beak, and feet of the golden eagle, but a man's arms and trunk. The Garuda is commonly used as an emblem in South and Southeast Asian nations. The use of the Garuda in Indonesia's coat-of-arms invokes the pre-colonial Hindu kingdoms that spanned across the archipelago, from which the present-day Republic of Indonesia is understood to be descended.

However, unlike the traditional anthropomorphic form of Garuda as featured in the temples of Java, the Balinese Garuda, or the national emblem of Thailand, the design of Indonesia's Garuda Pancasila is rendered in modern naturalist style. The design of Garuda Pancasila was inspired by the elang Jawa or Javan hawk-eagle (Nisaetus bartelsi), an endangered raptor endemic to the mountainous forest regions of Java. The Javan hawk-eagle's resemblance to the Garuda Pancasila is most obvious with the prominent crest crowning its head and the plumage colored dark-brownish to chestnut-gold. By presidential decree, the Javan hawk-eagle was legally registered as the national bird of Indonesia, and thus attributing the endangered species very high protection.

As for the national emblem, the Garuda symbolizes strength and power, while the gold colour symbolizes greatness and glory.

The feathers on the Garuda of the Indonesian coat-of-arms are arranged so that they invoke the date of 17 August 1945, the officially recognized Indonesian Day of Independence. The total number of feathers symbolizes the date of the proclamation of Indonesian independence:

- The number of feathers on each wing totals 17
- The number of feathers on the tail totals 8
- The number of feathers below the shield or base of tail totals 19
- The number of feathers on the neck totals 45

These numbers of feathers correspond to "17/8/1945" international date format for Indonesian Independence Day.

=== Symbols ===
Each section of the shield has a symbol corresponding to the Pancasila principles laid down by its founder, President Sukarno. The numbers of some elements in these symbols might evokes certain numbers, such as 17 and 5 which represents the date of independence and the number of principles in Pancasila, respectively.

=== Escutcheon ===
The escutcheon (in heraldic terms) or shield is a martial symbol, representing the defence of the country. It is divided into five sections: a background divided into quarters, colored red and white (the colors of the national flag) in a checkerboard pattern; and a smaller, concentric shield, black in background. A thick, black line lies horizontally across the shield, symbolizing the equator which passes through the Indonesian archipelago.

==== Star ====
The black shield bearing the golden star at centre corresponds to the first Pancasila principle: "Belief in One Supreme God". The colour black represents the colour of nature. Upon this shield at centre is a golden, five-pointed star. This is a symbol common not only among Indonesia's sanctioned faiths of Islam, Protestantism, Hinduism, Catholicism, Buddhism and Confucianism, as well as among some of the Aliran Kepercayaan (native religions), but of the secular ideology of socialism as well.

This tenet of Pancasila has been criticized, for it suggests compulsory religious belief as well as compulsory monotheism. Supporters of Sukarno's legacy, however, believe that this tenet was meant to unify Indonesia's population who have diverse beliefs and faiths from every part of the country (the star being a prominent symbol used by these faiths).

==== Chain ====
In the bottom right quarter, on a red background, is a chain made up of 9 round links representing women and 8 square links representing men, together they sum the number 17. This chain represents successive human generations. It corresponds to the second principle of the Pancasila, the principle of "Just and Civilized Humanity". The chain is in gold colour, representing the country's mineral wealth and its shape as a necklace is an indirect reference to its maritime wealth as it is a reminder of pearl necklaces made from sea pearls abundant in its waters.

==== Banyan tree ====
At the upper right quarter, on a white background, is the banyan tree (Indonesian: beringin). This symbol corresponds to the third Pancasila principle, the principle of "The Unity of Indonesia". The banyan is known for having expansive above-ground roots and branches. The Republic of Indonesia, as an ideal conceived by Sukarno and the Nationalists, is one country out of many far-flung cultural roots, made up of millions of people from a number of ethnic communities and groups and from 38 provinces from far west of Sumatra to far east of Papua. It also thus represents Indonesia's indigenous flora and forests. The tree, common in many parts of the country, was for many years till the present the party symbol of Suharto's Golkar and thus one of the more recognizable symbols of the New Order period.

==== Bull ====
In the upper left quarter, on a red background, is the head of the Javanese wild bull, the banteng. This represents the fourth principle of Pancasila, the principle of "Democracy that is Guided by the Inner Wisdom in the Unanimity Arising Out of Deliberations Amongst Representatives". The banteng was chosen to symbolize democracy as Indonesians saw it as a social animal. The bull is a symbol of Indonesia's fauna and wildlife. The banteng was also adopted as a symbol of Sukarno's Nationalists, and later by his daughter Megawati Soekarnoputri's Indonesian Democratic Party of Struggle.

==== Rice and cotton ====
In the lower left quarter, on a white background, are a gold-and-white paddy and cotton. There are 17 seeds of rice and 5 cotton buds. These represent the fifth Pancasila principle, the principle of "Social Justice for the Entire People of Indonesia". The rice and cotton represent sustenance and livelihood and also of industries, a symbol of food and non-food crops grown and cultivated in the country. Rice is a staple food among Indonesians while cotton-related industries form part of Indonesia's non-food production for consumer products.

== Mars Pancasila ==
The Mars Pancasila (lit. 'Pancasila March'), colloquially and significantly better known by its incipit Garuda Pancasila, was composed by Sudharnoto as a patriotic song to commemorate the Indonesian struggle.

Lyrics

Garuda Pancasila
Akulah pendukungmu
Patriot proklamasi
Sedia berkorban untukmu

Pancasila dasar negara
Rakyat adil makmur sentosa
Pribadi bangsaku
Ayo maju maju
Ayo maju maju
Ayo maju maju

Literal translation

O, Garuda Pancasila
I am your supporter
A patriot of Proclamation
(I am) willing to sacrifice for you

Pancasila the basis of the country
The people right and prospering
My nation's character
Let us go forth
Let us go forth
Let us go forth

Poetic translation

O, Garuda Pancasila
A soldier for you, I am
A vanguard of Proclamation, I stand
I place my life and fortune in your hands

Pancasila the law of the land
People prospering hand-in-hand
Our nation's pride and joy
Onwards, march all
Onwards, march all
Onwards, march all

== Gallery ==
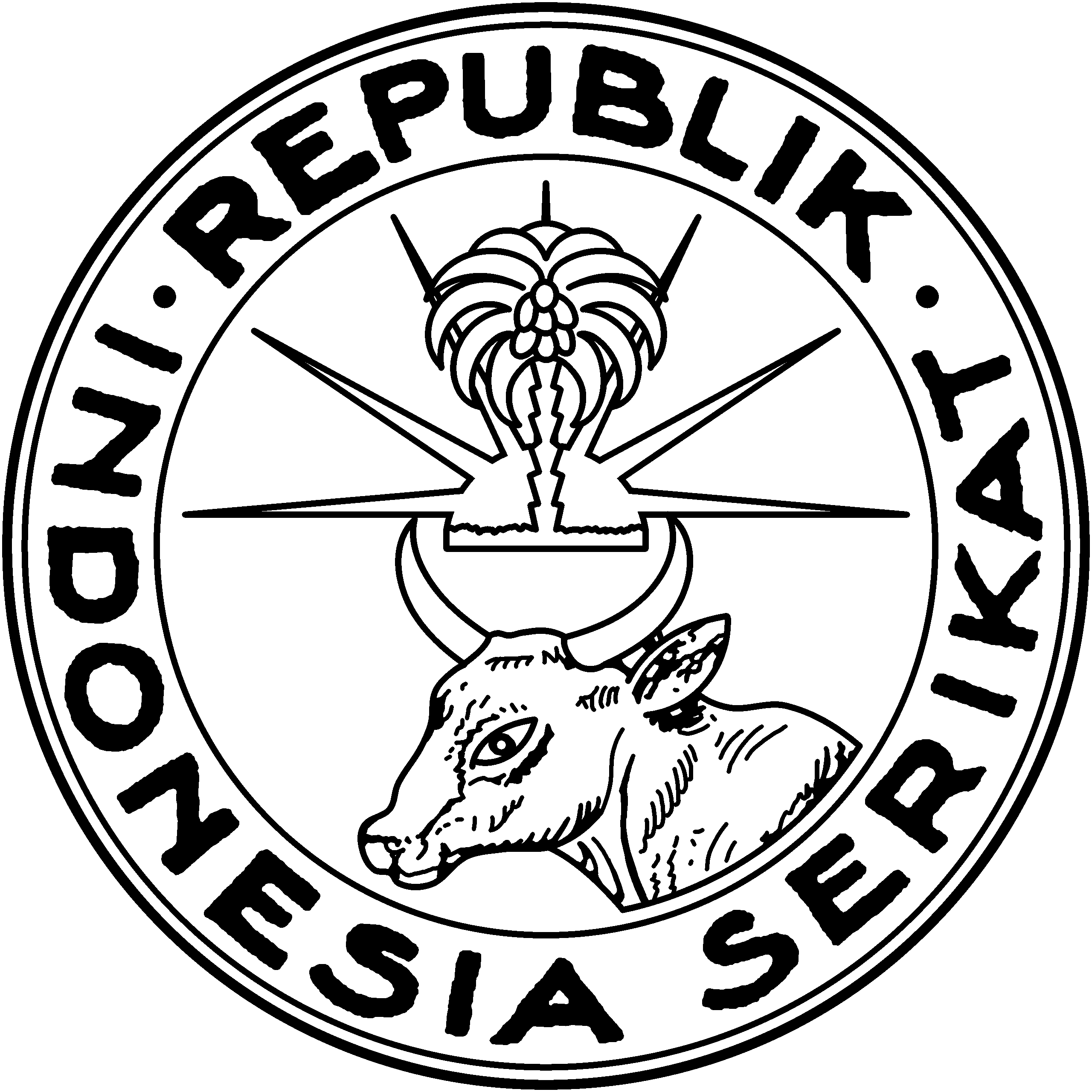
Mohammad Yamin's first proposed seal design for the United States of Indonesia, rejected, deemed too similar to the Rising Sun Flag (1949–1950)

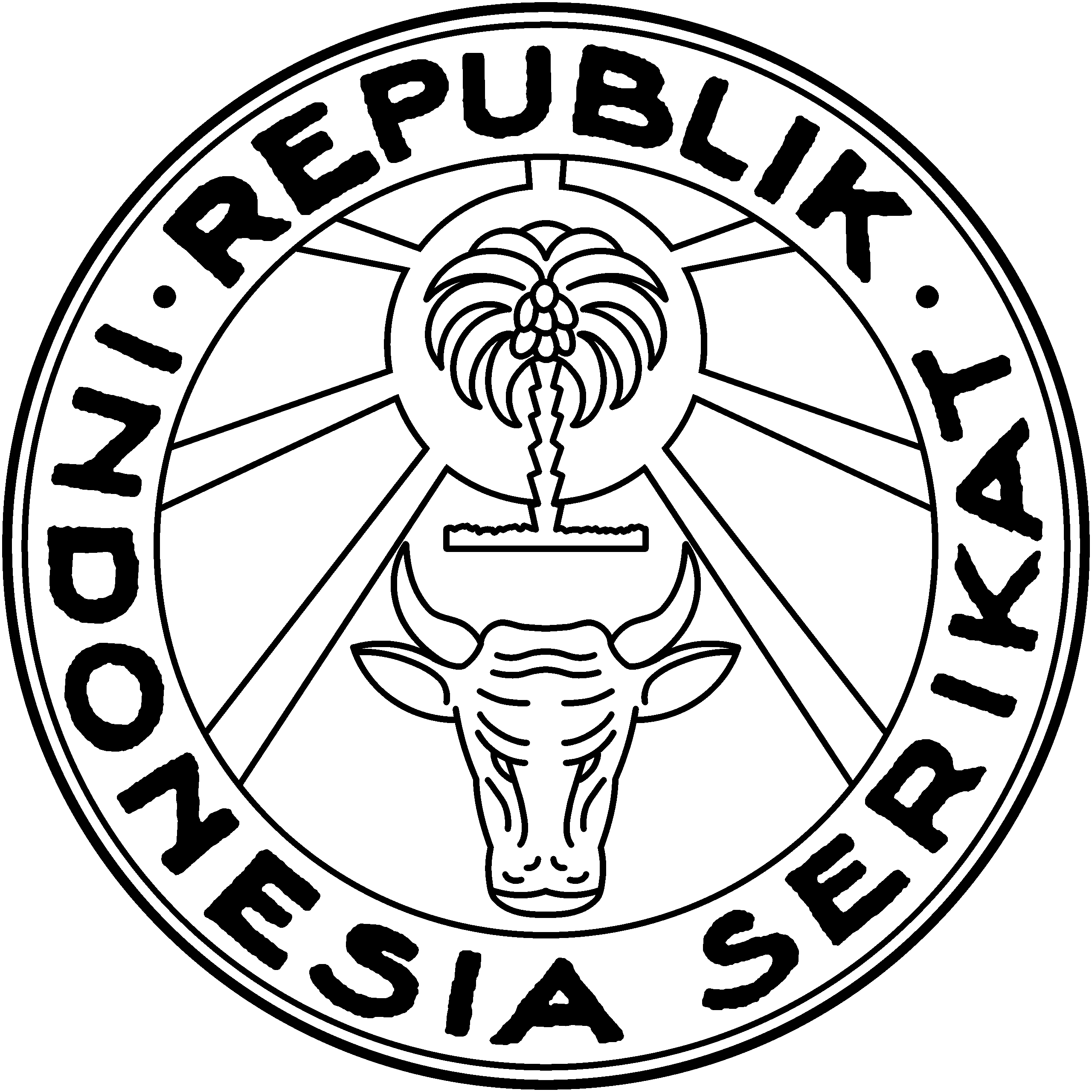
Mohammad Yamin's second proposed seal design for the United States of Indonesia, rejected, deemed too similar to the Rising Sun Flag (1949–1950)

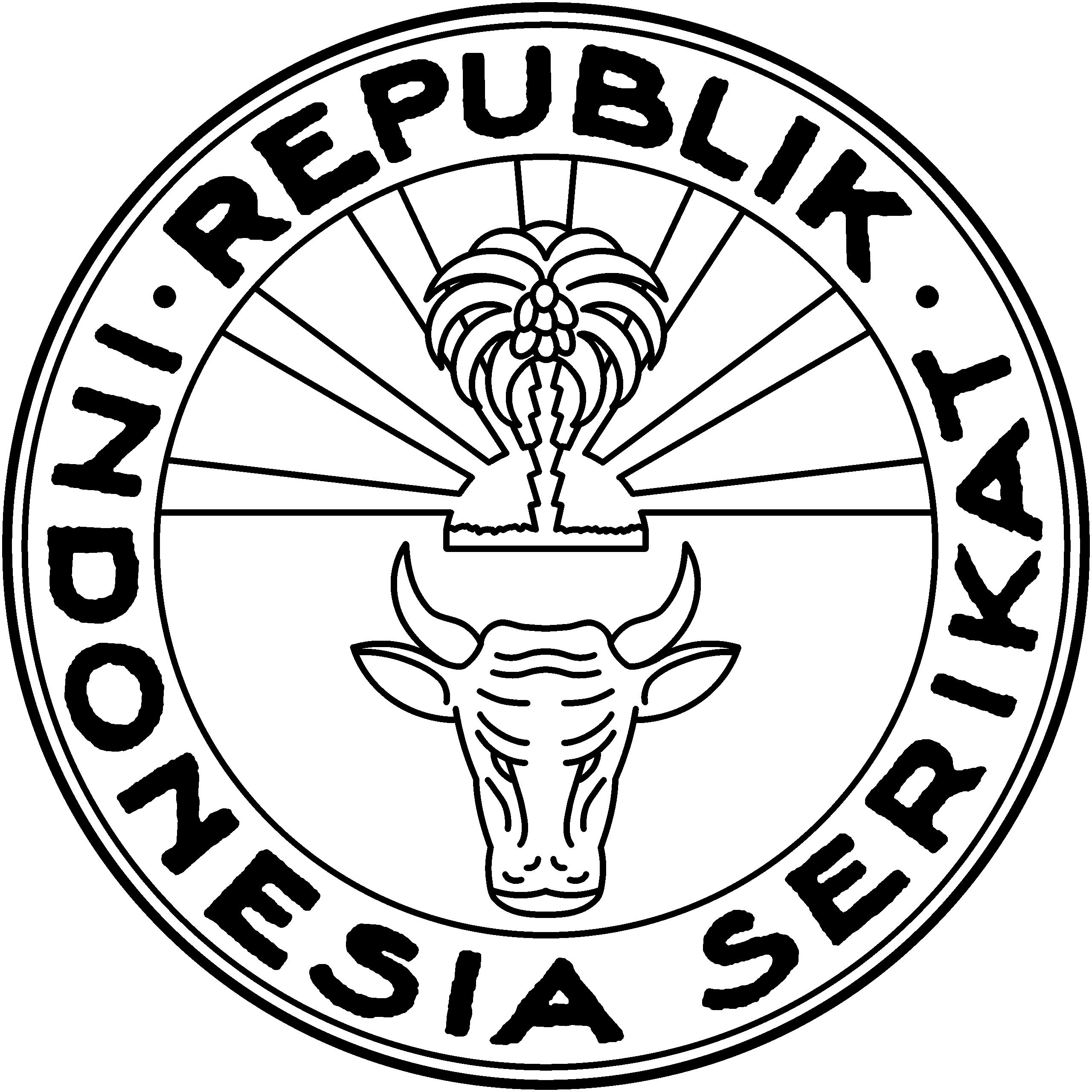
Mohammad Yamin's third proposed seal design for the United States of Indonesia, rejected, deemed too similar to the Rising Sun Flag (1949–1950)

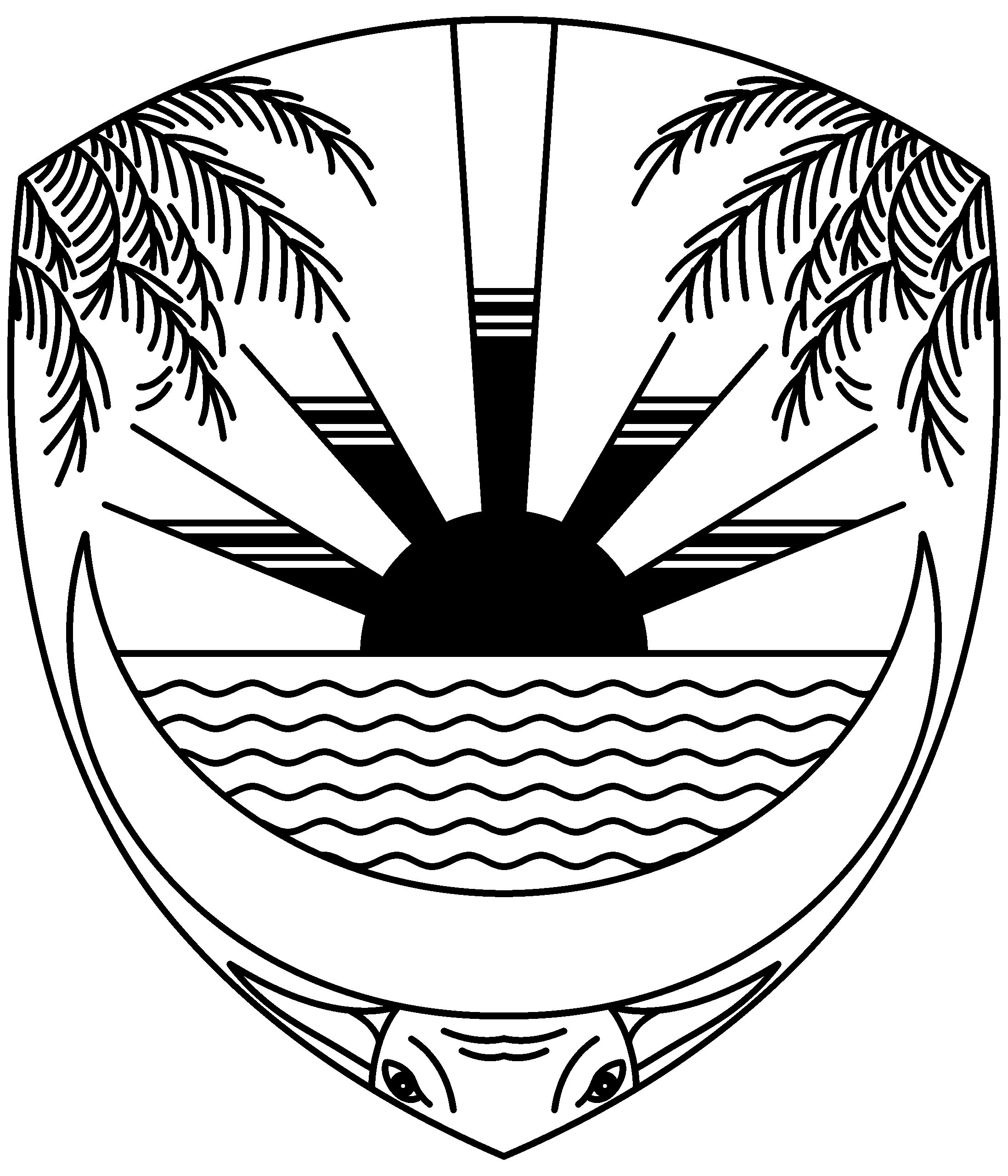
Mohammad Yamin's proposed escutcheon design for the United States of Indonesia, rejected, deemed too similar to the Rising Sun Flag (1949–1950)

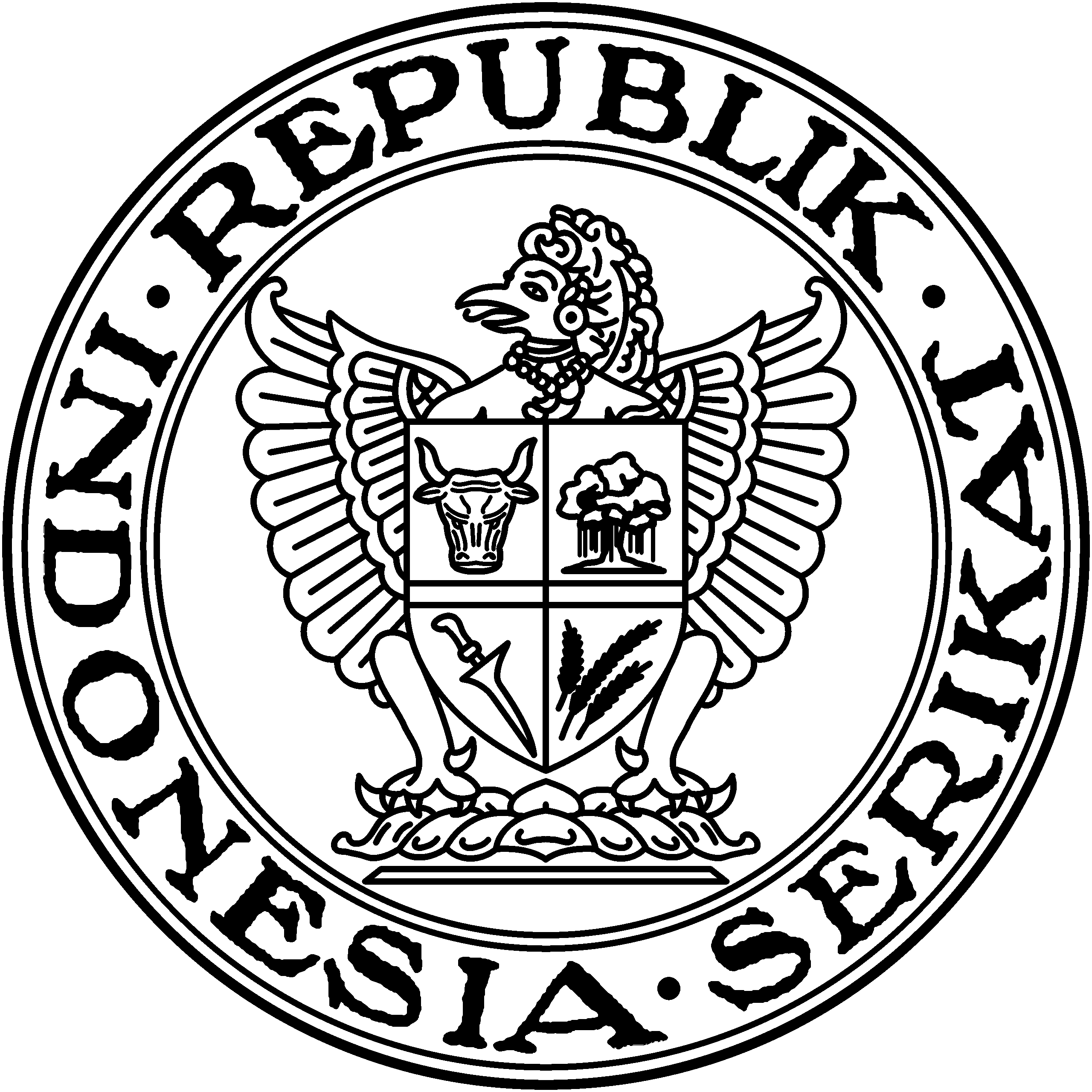
First proposed seal design for the United States of Indonesia (1949–1950)

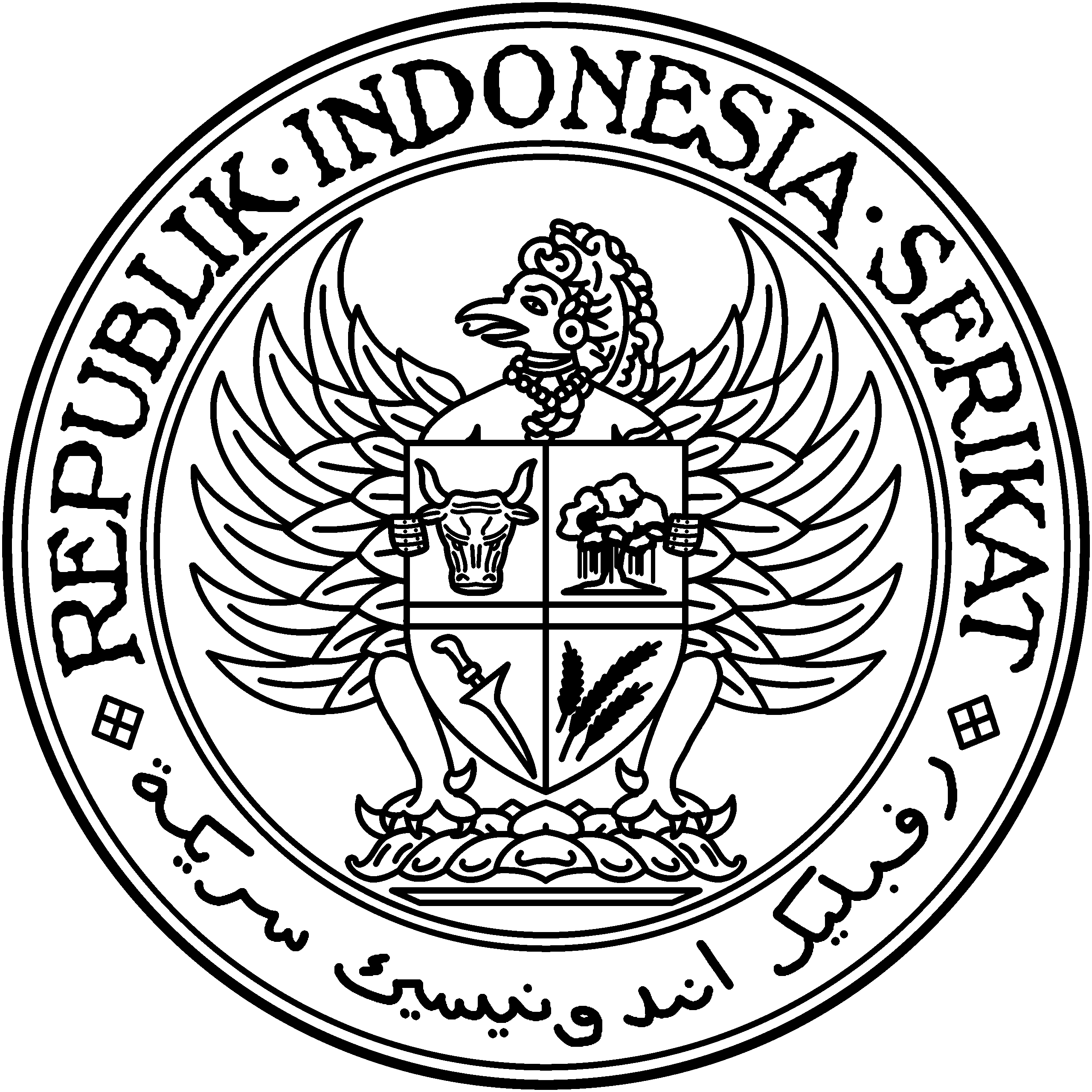
Second proposed seal design for the United States of Indonesia (1949–1950)

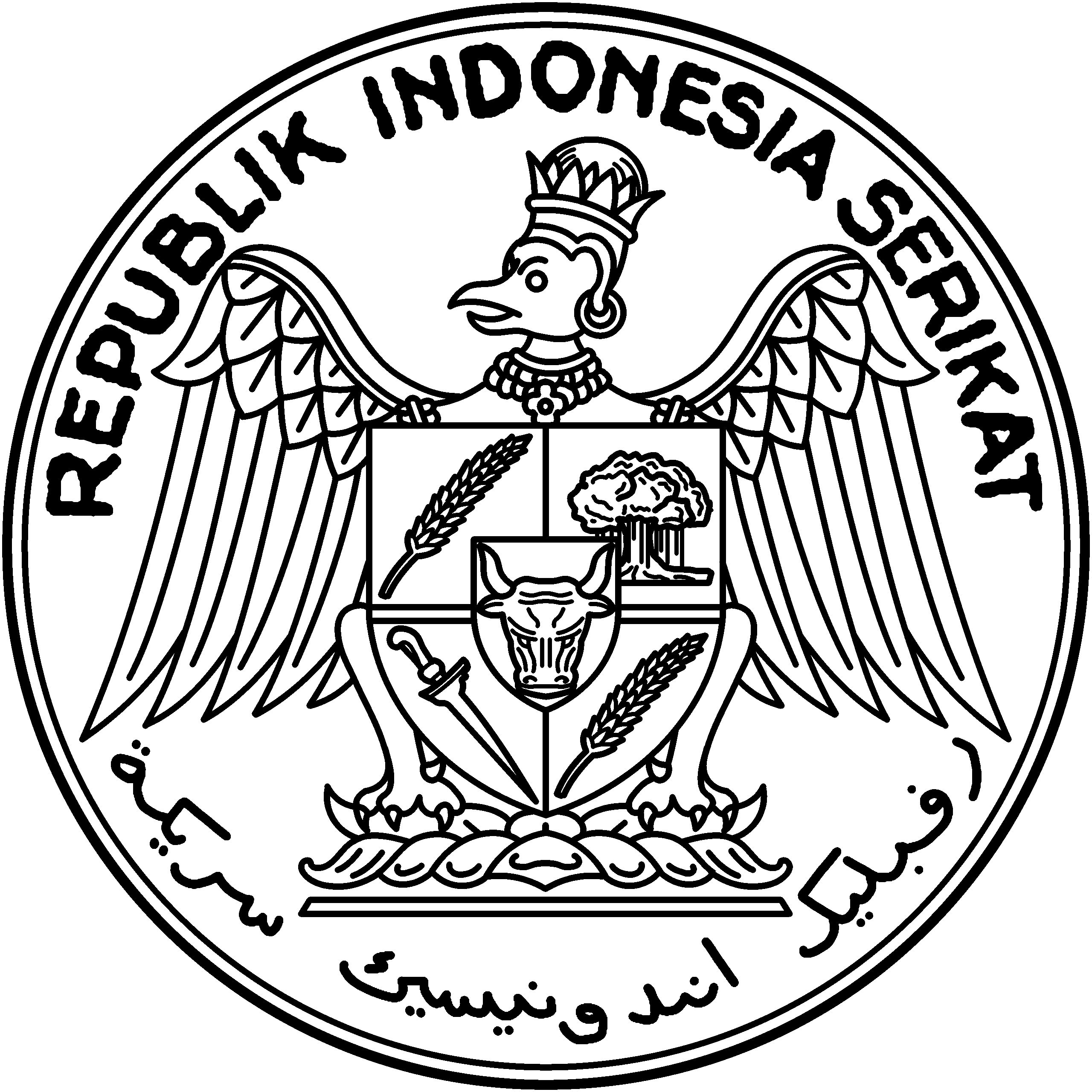
Third proposed seal design for the United States of Indonesia (1949–1950)

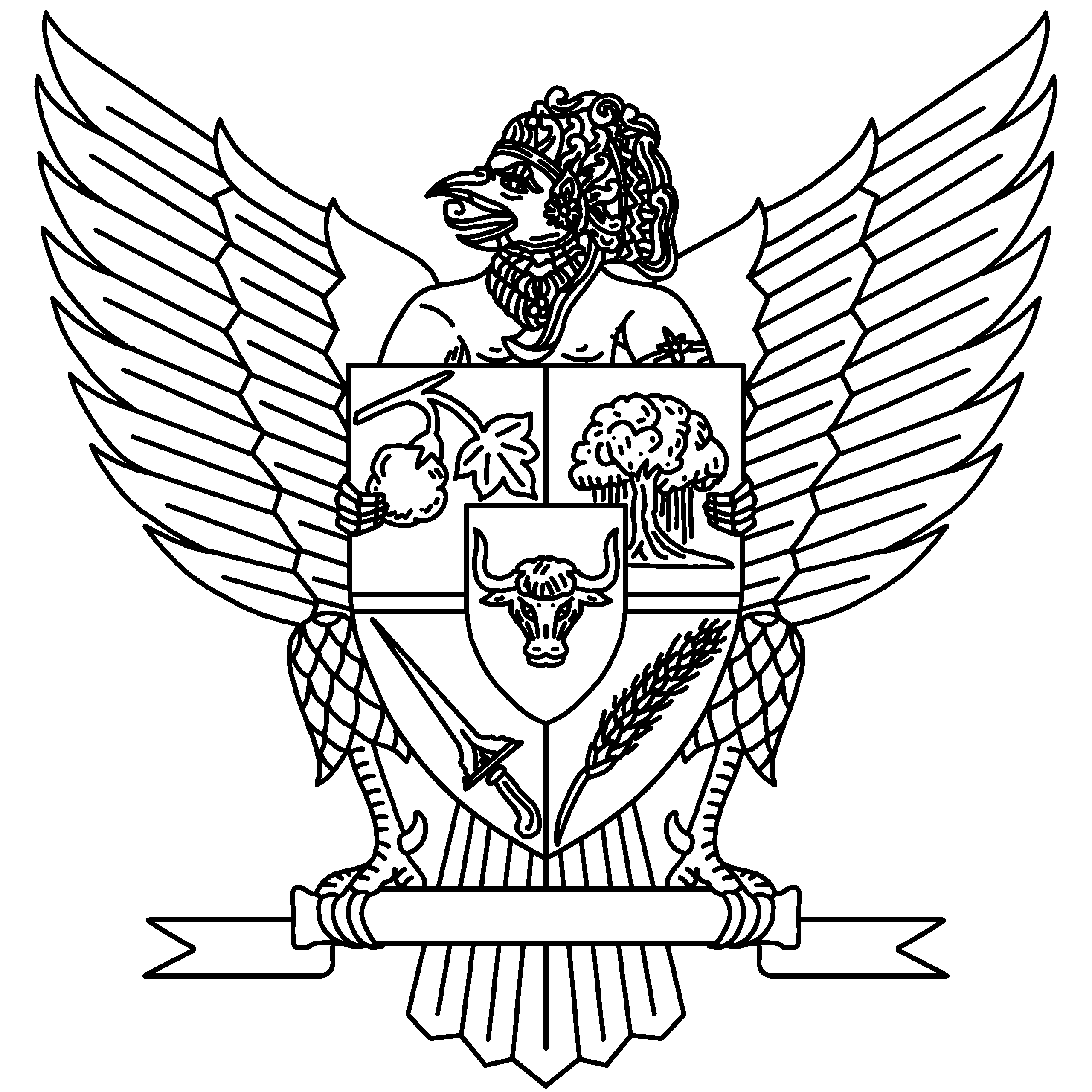
One of the early design of the coat of arms of United States of Indonesia (1949–1950)

Final design of the coat of arms of the United States of Indonesia, deemed too mythical by Masyumi (1949–1950)

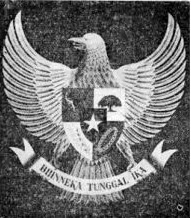
Prototype of the present national coat of arms, deemed too similar to the United States bald eagle (1950)

Coat of arms of Indonesia (1950–present)

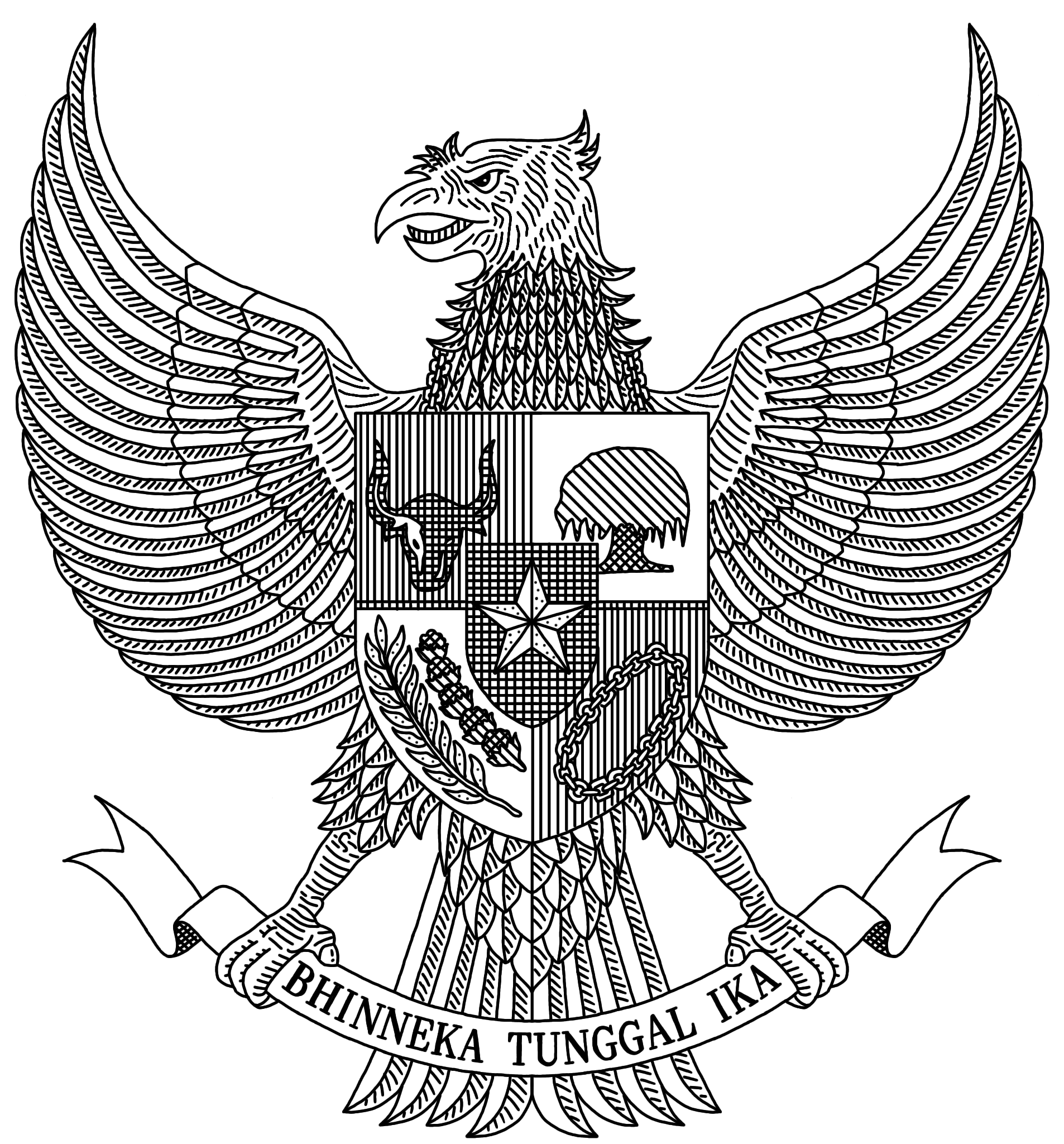
Hatched coat of arms of Indonesia (1950–present)

== See also ==
- Garuda
- Garuda Indonesia
- Emblems of Indonesia
- Pancasila
- Similarly designed armorial of Asia:
  - Emblem of Thailand, which also adopted the Garuda as a supporter.
  - Armorial of Sabah and Sarawak, which adopted similar bird motifs in the past or present.
