= Wiki Indaba =

Regional conference for African Wikimedians

WikiIndaba
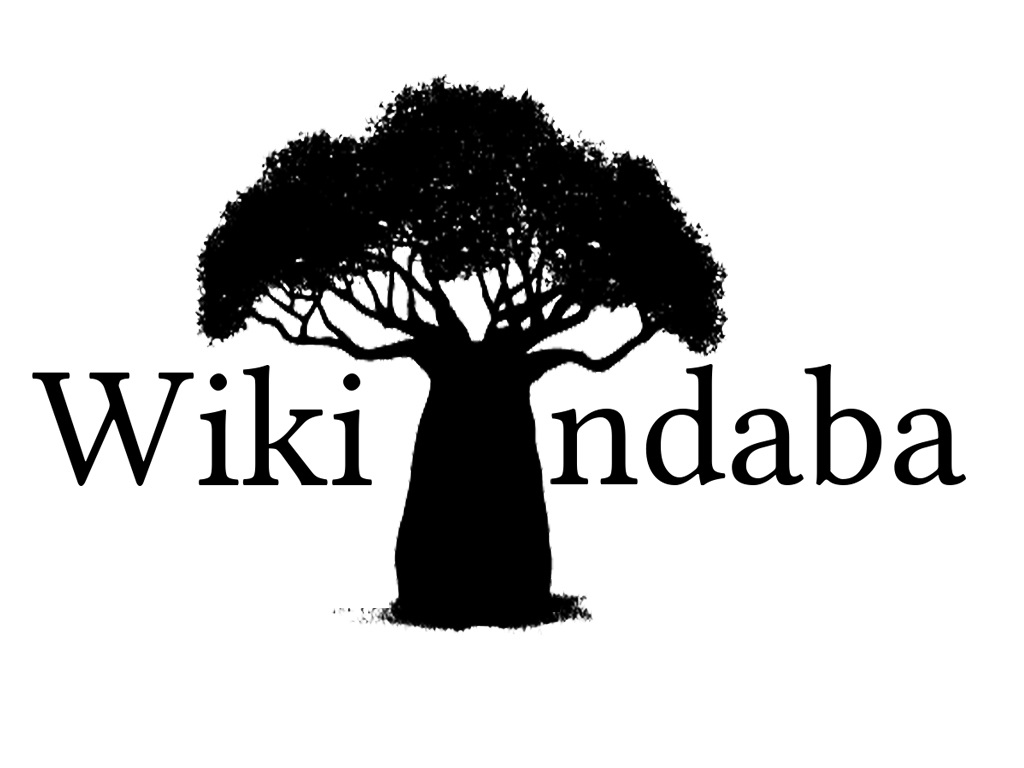
- Status: Active
- Genre: Conference
- Location: Various
- Inaugurated: 2014; 12 years ago
- Most recent: 2025
- Previous event: Wiki Indaba 2024
- Organiser: Local volunteer teams
- Filing status: Non-profit
- Website: meta.wikimedia.org/wiki/Wiki_Indaba

Welcoming words of Wiki Indaba 2023 in Agadir, Morocco.

Wiki Indaba is a regional conference for African Wikimedians both within the continent and in the diaspora. Topics of presentation and dialogue include Wikimedia projects such as Wikipedia, other wikis, open-source software, free knowledge, free content and how these projects affect the African continent.

== COVID-19 impact ==
Before the COVID-19 pandemic, affiliate usergroups selected to host the conference would organise to host it in-person. However since the onset of COVID-19, the format has changed to hybrid where participants can attend both online and physical. Uganda was the recent affiliate country to host it solely online in 2021 which saw the numbers of participants double from when it hosted in person.

== Overview ==
Logo	Conference	Date	Host country
	WikiIndaba 2014	June 20–22	Johannesburg, South Africa
	WikiIndaba 2017	January 20–22	Accra, Ghana
	WikiIndaba 2018	March 16–18	Tunis, Tunisia
	WikiIndaba 2019	November 8–10	Abuja, Nigeria
	WikiIndaba 2021	November 5–7	Kampala, Uganda
	WikiIndaba 2022	November 4–6	Kigali, Rwanda
	WikiIndaba 2023	November 3–5	Agadir, Morocco
	WikiIndaba 2024	October 4–6	Johannesburg, South Africa

== Pictures ==
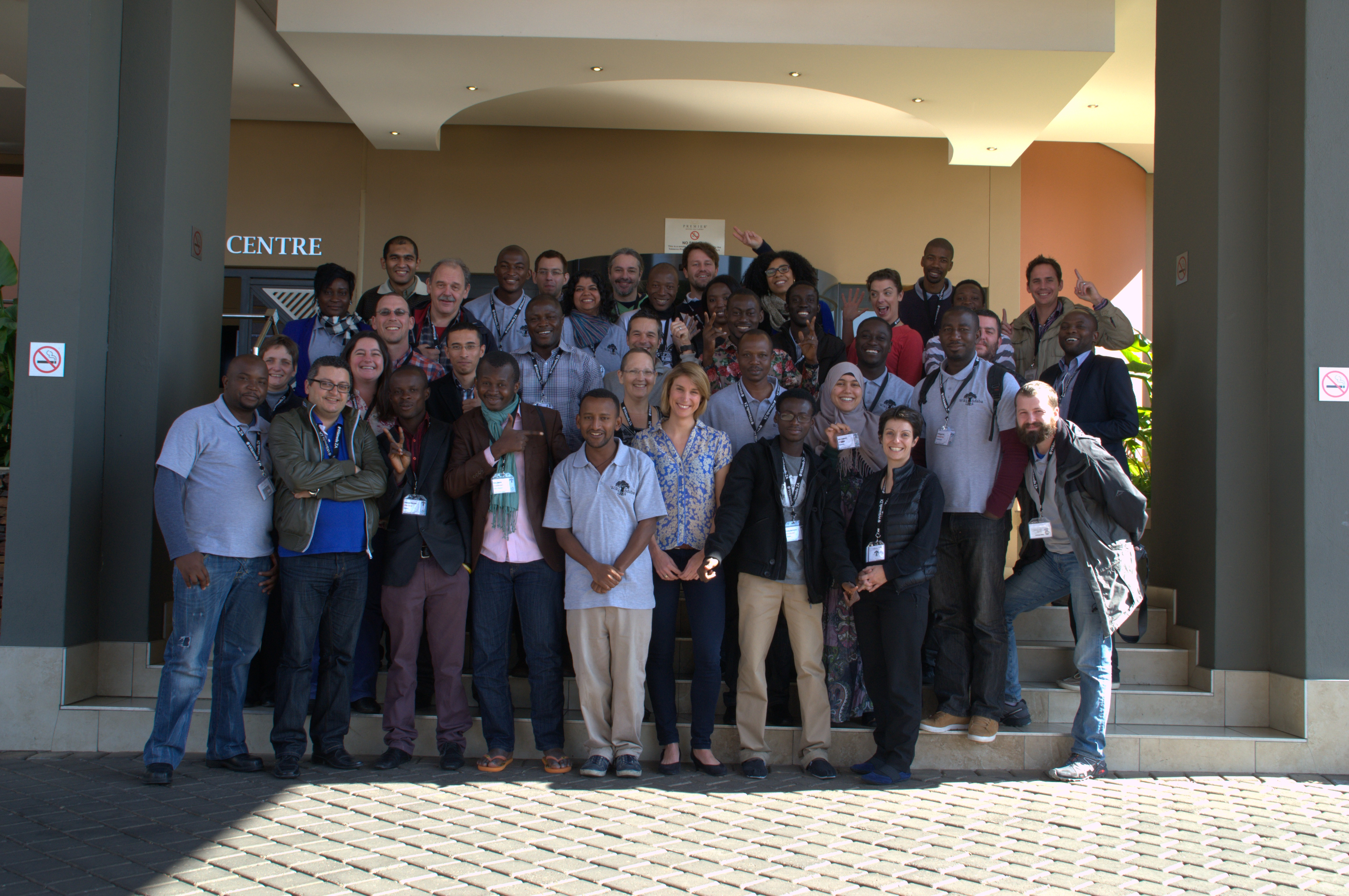
2014

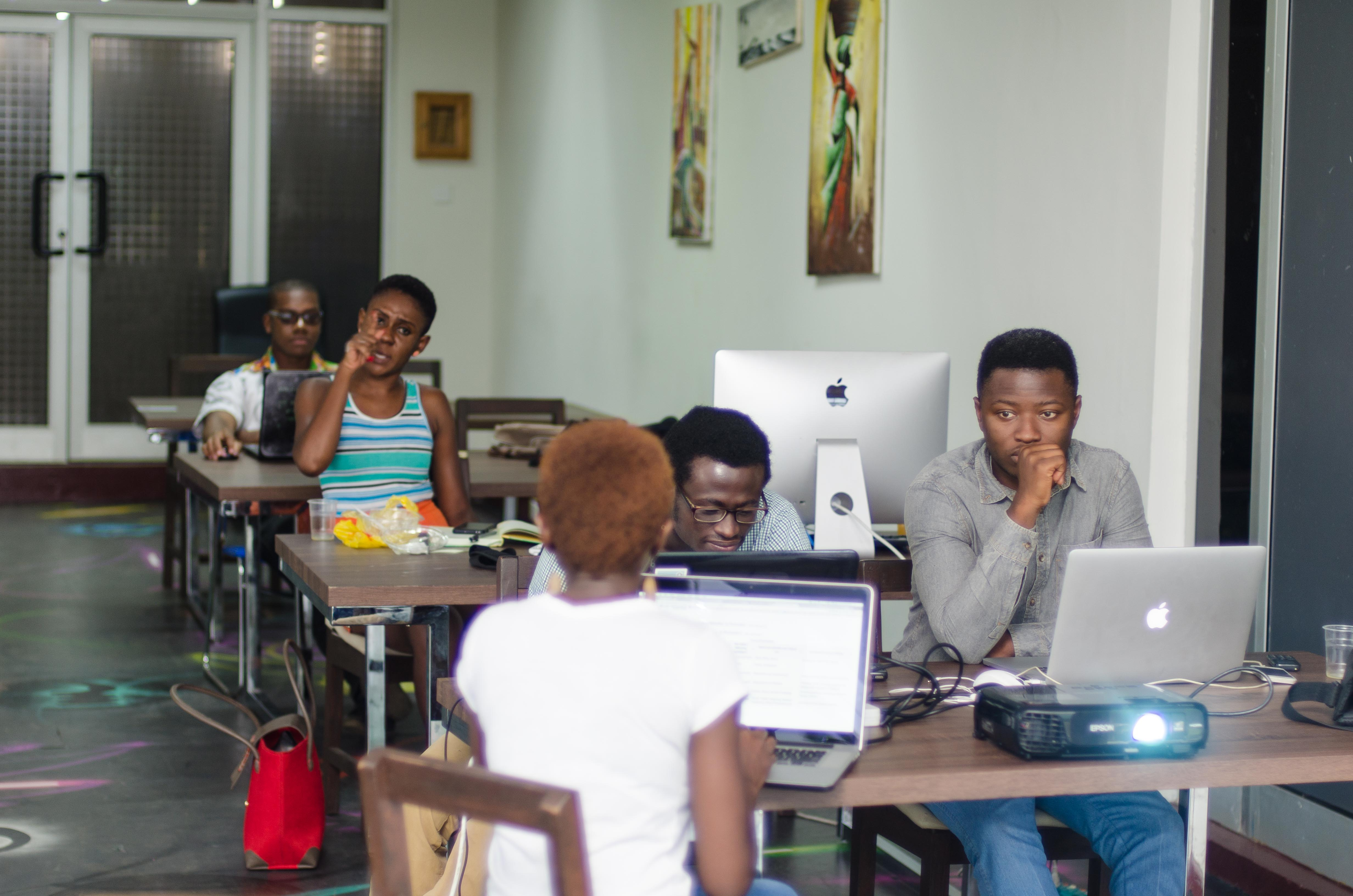
2016

2017

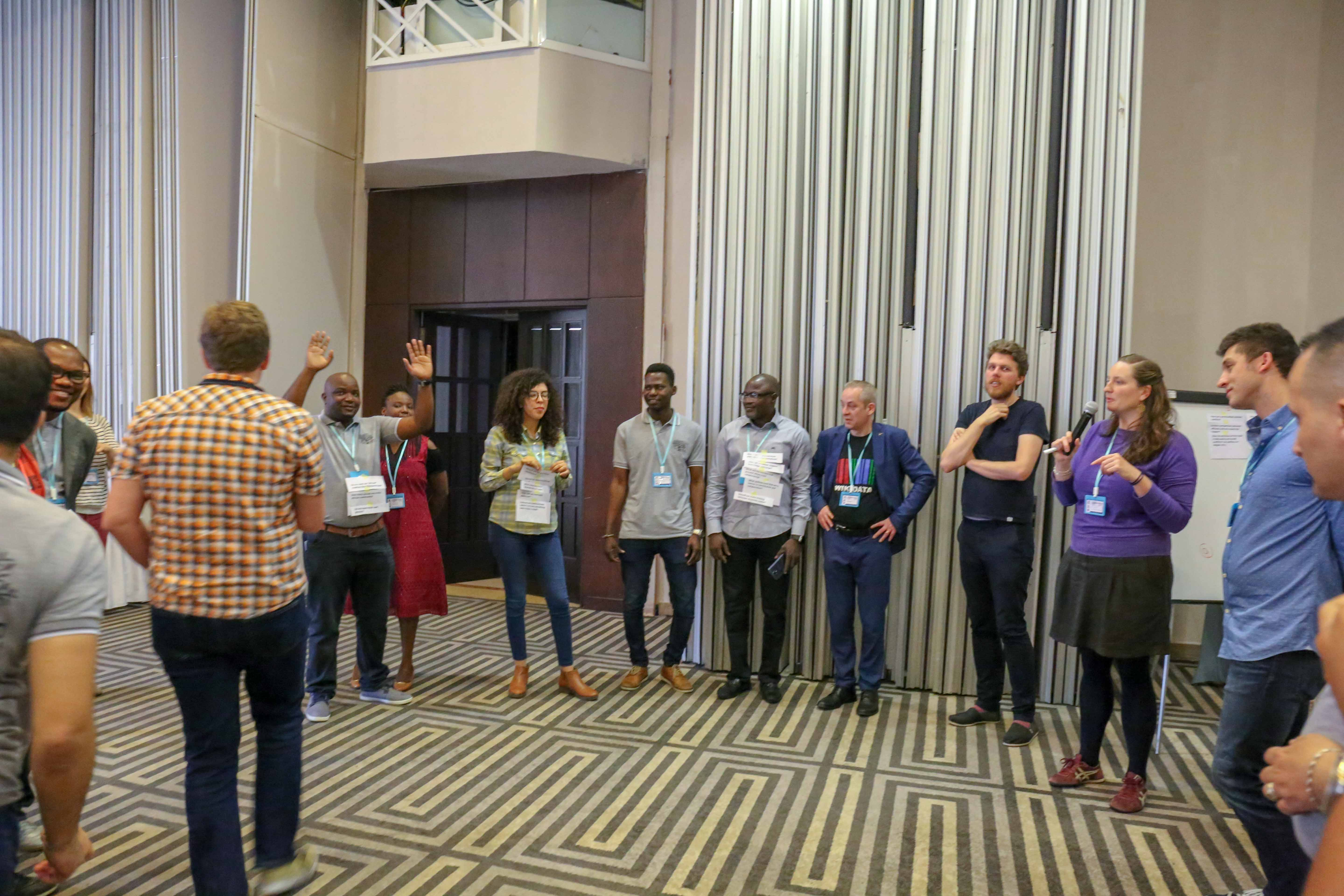
2018

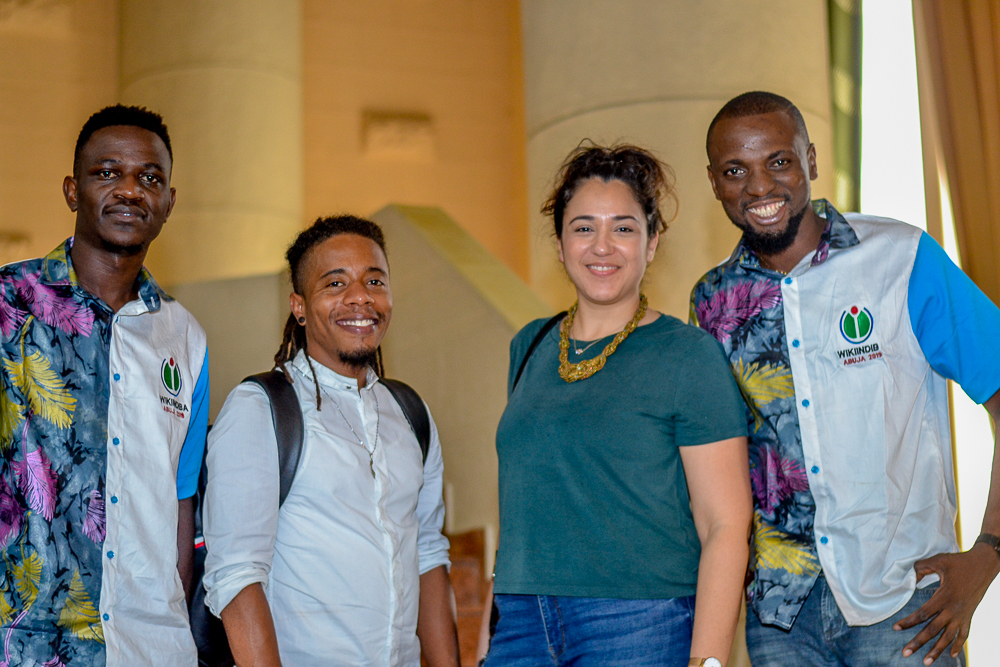
2019

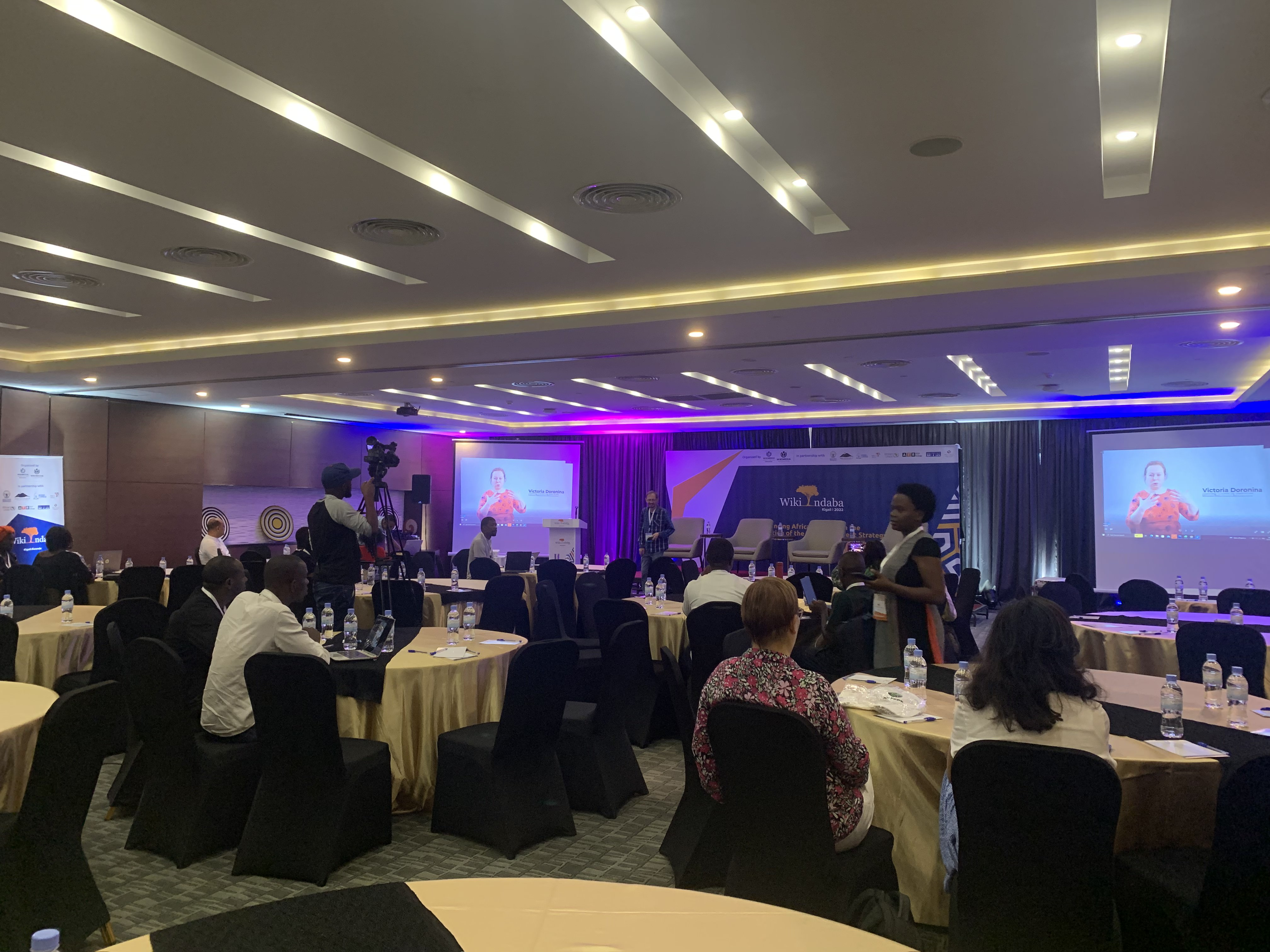
2022

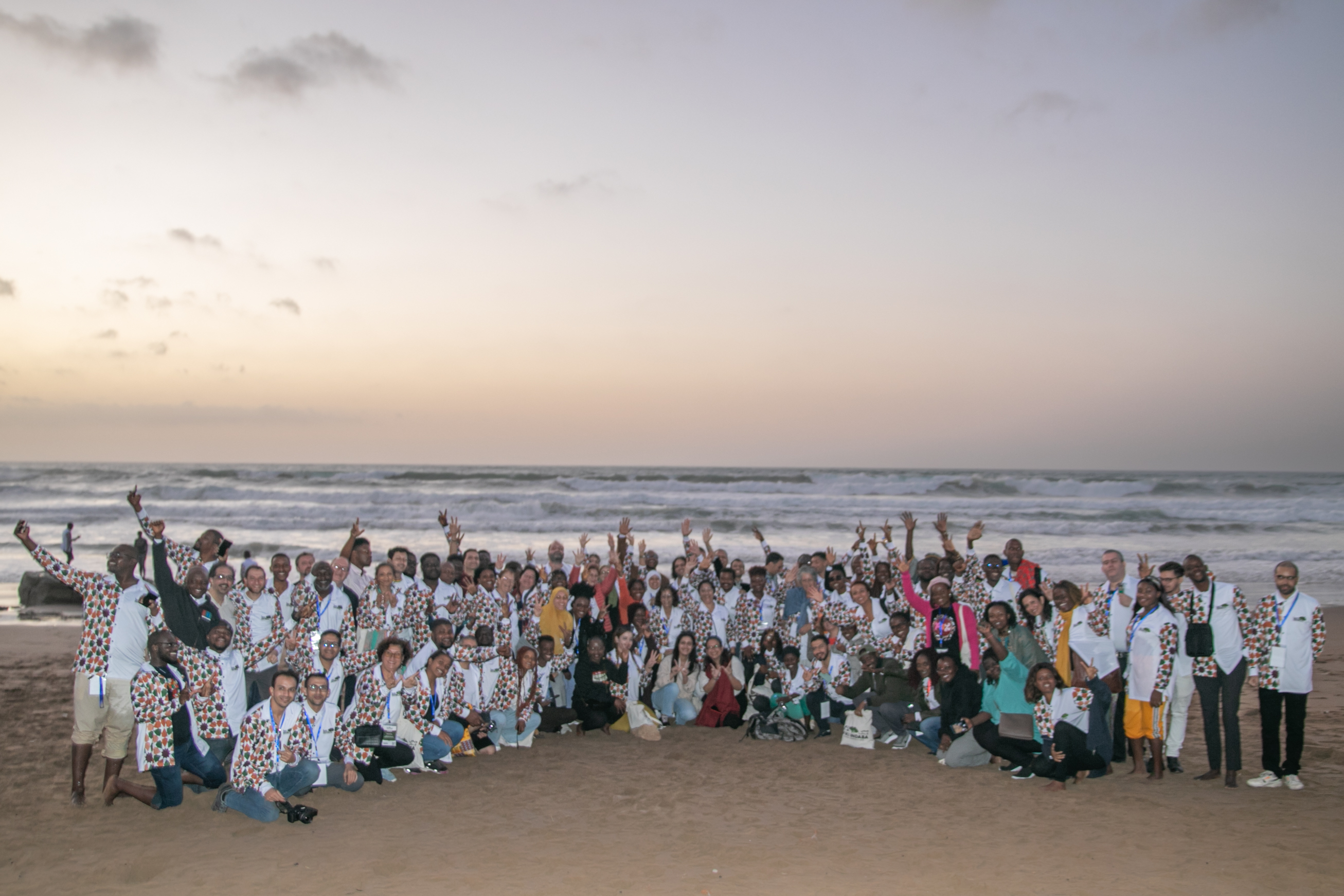
2023

== See also ==
- WikiAfrica
- WikiConference India
- WikiConference North America
- Wikipedia Summit India
- Wikimania
