= Rubik =

Rubik may refer to:

- Rubik (surname)
- Rubik (town), town in Albania
- Rubik (band), Finnish pop/rock band

== See also ==
- Rubik's Cube
- Ernő Rubik, creator of the Rubik's Cube
- Alfrēds Rubiks (born 1935), Latvian politician
