= Rubric (translation organisation) =

Localization and translation service provider

- Logo since 2021
- Founded: 1994; 32 years ago
- Type: Employee ownership trust
- Location: Edinburgh, Scotland
- Region served: Worldwide
- Method: Translations
- Website: www.rubric.com

Rubric, Inc. is a global language service provider, offering localization and translation services for companies across the technology, software, marketing, media publishing, manufacturing and tourism industries.

Rubric was founded in the UK 1994 and expanded into the United States in 1997. Today, Rubric offers translation services in 135 different languages. The company is headquartered in Edinburgh.

Rubric supports Translators Without Borders. Through its Access to Knowledge Awards, Translators Without Borders has recognized Rubric twice, awarding the company a Donor Award Honorable Mention in 2012 and a Donor Award in 2013.

Rubric became an Employee Ownership Trust in 2022.

== Projects ==
=== The Ebola Health Information Project ===
In response to the 2014 Ebola virus epidemic in West Africa, Rubric worked with WikiAfrica and Wiki Project Medicine to translate health information about Ebola into South African languages, including, Zulu, Setswana, Sesotho, Siswati, Ndebele, Xitsonga, Tshivenda, Xhosa and Sepedi. The project increased the number of articles covering “Ebola” from 40 languages to more than 110. In October 2014 during the annual summit of One Young World, Wikipedia founder Jimmy Wales spoke about the Ebola Health Information Project.

=== The Mozilla Firefox Project ===
In 2013, Rubric translated the Mozilla Firefox Web browser to Xhosa.

In 2021, Rubric translated the Mozilla Firefox Web browser to Scots.

== Clients ==
Rubric clients include Amway, Toshiba, British Broadcasting Corporation, Bose, Oxford University Press, AccuWeather and SuccessFactors, an SAP company.

== Outreach ==
Rubric employees participate in the annual job fair at Heriot-Watt University.
