= WikiAfrica =

Project to improve African content on Wikimedia projects

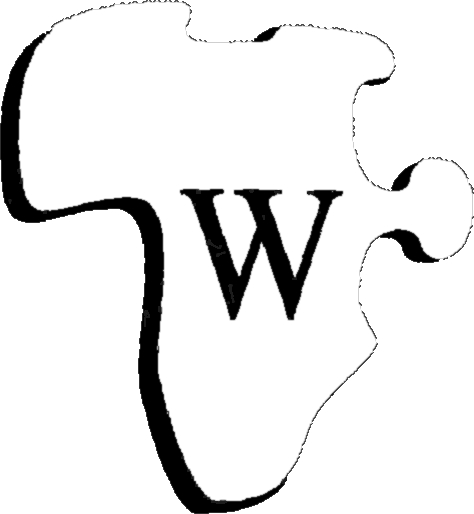
- Website type: Wikiproject
- Available in: Multilingual (3 active Main Page translations)
- Owner: Wikimedia Italia
- Website: wikiafrica.org
- Commercial: No
- Registration: No
- Launched: 2007; 19 years ago
- Current status: Active

WikiAfrica focuses on getting external Africa-based, cultural organisations, museums and archives, as well as bloggers and journalists, to contribute their knowledge to Wikipedia. The project is an international collaboration that intends to Africanise Wikipedia by creating and expanding 30.000 articles on Wikipedia over two years. The principal reason for this focus is for people with the greatest knowledge of the African continent to participate in the online representation of Africa. This project will contribute to building a free and open encyclopedia that provides greater access and visibility to current information and historic archives about Africa.

== History ==
WikiAfrica began in 2007, its leadership focusing on producing content, ensuring the involvement of experts and institutions, assessing and utilizing other assets and dealing with other critical aspects of the project.

Non-profit foundation Lettera27 and contemporary art platform Africa Centre joined together in order to obtain more information from Africans about Africa. In terms of marking events, people and places of global historic importance, literature, science, art or any other information Africa has been the least visible continent on the internet. It was decided to not merely translate the English Wikipedia, but to expand the coverage of Africa and its culture.

== Topics and materials ==
Pan-African based organisations and WikiAfrica users are asked to create new articles, expand the African content across multiple Wikipedias and improve the information that has already been given. This can be done by sharing knowledge and translating articles.

WikiAfrica operates with free sharing of materials produced by the project, having adopted of Open Access and Creative Commons licenses CC BY-SA and the GNU Free Documentation License.

== Network and participants ==
WikiAfrica is principally a collaboration between the lettera27 Foundation and the Africa Centre, with aid from Wikimedia Italia.

Lettera 27 and Wikimedia Italia promote WikiAfrica through networks, research, publications and events.

== See also ==
- Wiki Indaba
- Women in Red
