= Arjunawijaya =

Fourteenth century Javanese palm-leaf manuscript

Kakawin Arjunawijaya is an Old Javanese poem in poetic meters (kakawin or kavya), written by Mpu Tantular between 1374 and 1379 CE.

Manuscripts of this work have been found both in Bali and Java.

Another famous kakawin by him is the Sutasoma, which states that Shiva and Buddha are one. Sutasoma has been the source the motto of Indonesia, Bhinneka Tunggal Ika, which is usually translated as Unity in Diversity, although it means '(Although) in pieces, yet One'. Arjunawijaya also states that Shiva and Buddha are one. The kernel of the story is the combat between Dasamukha and Waisrawana, followed by that between Dasamukha and Arjuna Sahasrabāhu.

== Bibliography ==
- Poerbatjaraka, Raden Mas Ngabei; Hadidjaja, Tardjan (1952), Kepustakaan Djawa, Djambatan
- Supomo, S (2017-11-17), Arjunawijaya : a kakawin of mpu Tantular
