= Rubik (surname) =

The surname Rubik may refer to:

- Anja Rubik (born 1983), Polish fashion model
- Ernő Rubik (aircraft designer) (1910–1997), Hungarian aircraft designer, father of Ernő Rubik
- Ernő Rubik (born 1944), Hungarian professor and inventor, famous for inventing the Rubik's Cube, son of Ernő Rubik (aircraft designer)
- Piotr Rubik (born 1968), Polish composer
