= Mpu Tantular =

Javanese poet

- Occupation: Old Javanese Writer
- Known for: Bhinneka Tunggal Ika
- Notable work: Book of Arjunawijaya, Book of Sutasoma

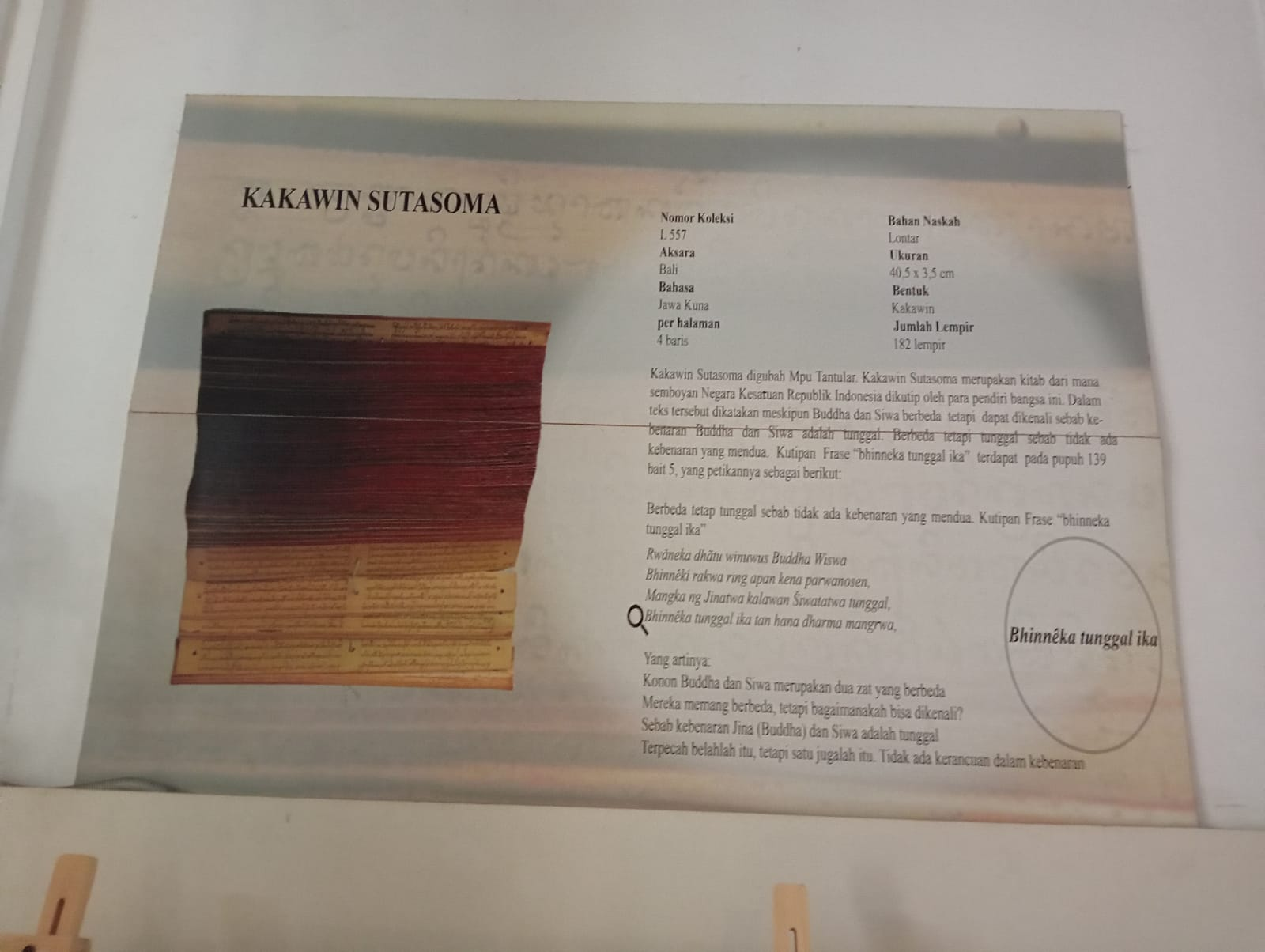
Kakawin Sutasoma of Mpu Tantular, 14th-century manuscript of Indonesia

Mpu Tantular (c. 14th century) was a famous Javanese poet of Javanese literature who lived in the 14th century, during the reign of king Hayam Wuruk. Tantular was a Buddhist, and was respectful to other religions. This can be seen in two items of kakawin or poetry, the Kakawin Arjunawijaya and Kakawin Sutasoma. One of the verses from the Kakawin Sutasoma was later taken as the motto or motto of the Republic of Indonesia: "Bhinneka Tunggal Ika" or different but one.

== Name ==
The name "Mpu Tantular" itself means "not" (tan) and "affected" (tular). Thus, the image of Mpu Tantular as his name implies is that of a mpu (scholar, thinker, poet) who has a firm stand, and is not easily influenced by anyone.

== Bhinneka Tunggal Ika ==
Mpu Tantular's Kakawin Sutasoma was quoted by Mohammad Yamin in formulating the nation's motto, namely Bhinneka Tunggal Ika. The quote from the phrase Bhinneka Tunggal Ika is found in the canto 139 stanza 5. Translated word for word, the word bhinnêka means "variety" and consists of the words bhinna and ika, which are combined. The single word means "one." The word ika means "it". Literally, Bhinneka Tunggal Ika is translated as "The Diversity of One," which means that despite being diverse, the Indonesian people are still one unit. This motto is used to describe the unity and integrity of the Nation and the Unitary State of the Republic of Indonesia which consists of various cultures, regional languages, races, ethnicities, religions and beliefs. As head of the Faculty of Philosophy of Gadjah Mada University, Rizal Mustansyir, writes, "the motto of Bhinneka Tunggal Ika explains clearly that there is diversity in various aspects of life that makes the Indonesian nation a unified and unified nation."
