= Kakawin Sutasoma =

Old Javanese poem

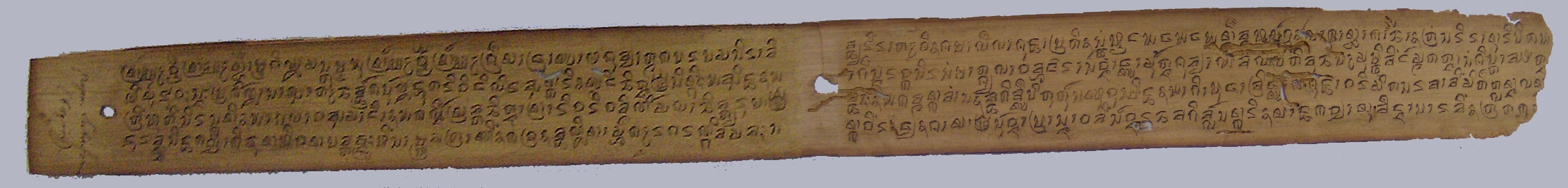
Palm leaf manuscript of Kakawin Sutasoma, a 14th-century Javanese poem

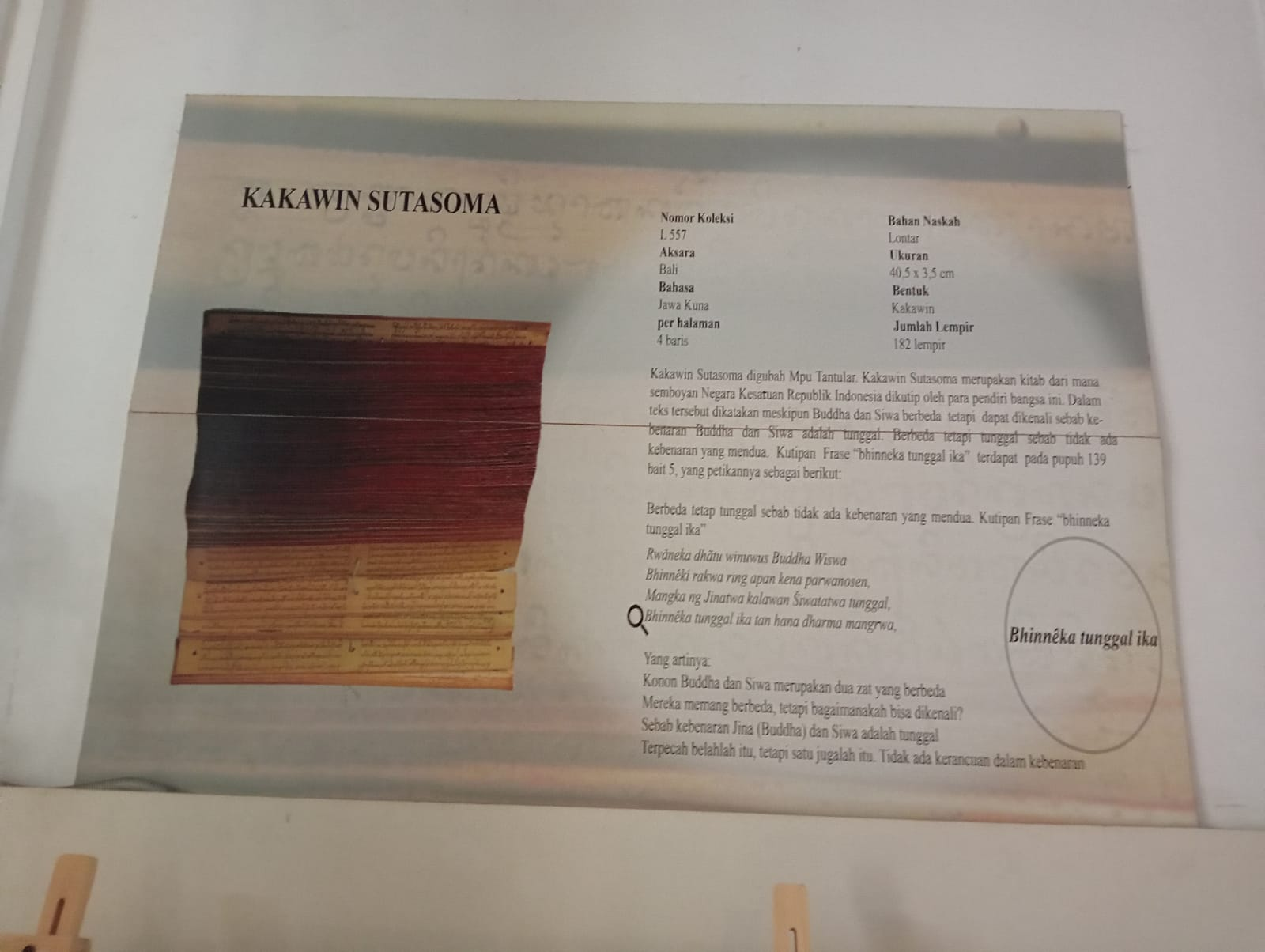
Kakawin Sutasoma of Mpu Tantular, 14th century manuscript at Perpustakaan Nasional Republik Indonesia, Jl. Medan Merdeka Selatan, Jakarta

Kakawin Sutasoma is an Old Javanese poem in poetic meters (kakawin or kavya), based on Mahasutasoma Jataka. It is the source of the motto of Indonesia, Bhinneka Tunggal Ika, which is usually translated as Unity in Diversity, although it means '(Although) in pieces, yet One'. It is not without reason that the motto was taken from this kakawin as the kakawin teaches religious tolerance, specifically between the Hindu and Buddhist religions.

The Kakawin tells the epic story of Lord Sutasoma, and was written by Mpu Tantular in the 14th Century. The poem is played in wayang theater.

== Historical context ==
Kakawin Sutasoma was written by Tantular during the golden age of the Majapahit empire, in the reign of either Prince Rajasanagara or King Hayam Wuruk. It is not known for certain when the Kakawin was authored, but it is thought most probably between 1365 and 1389. 1365 is the year in which the Kakawin Nagarakretagama was completed, while 1389 is the year in which King Hayam Wuruk died. Kakawin Sutasoma was written after Kakawin Nagarakretagama.

Existing copies of Kakawin Sutasoma have survived in the form of manuscripts, written both on lontar and on paper. Nearly all surviving copies originated in Bali. However, there is one Javanese fragment surviving which forms part of the Merapi and Merbabu Collection. This is a collection of ancient manuscripts originating from the region of the mountains of Merapi and Merbabu in Central Java. The survival of this fragment confirms that the text of Kakawin Sutasoma is indeed Javanese rather than Balinese in origin.

Tantular is also known to have written Kakawin Arjunawijaya. Both kakawin use very similar language and have a very similar style. Kakawin Sutasoma is considered unique in Javanese literature because it is the only Kakawin that is Buddhist. Kakawin Sutasoma is one of the most well-known kakawin in Bali and was popularized by I Gusti Bagus Surgriwa, an expert in Balinese literature who included the studies of kakawins.

== Summary ==
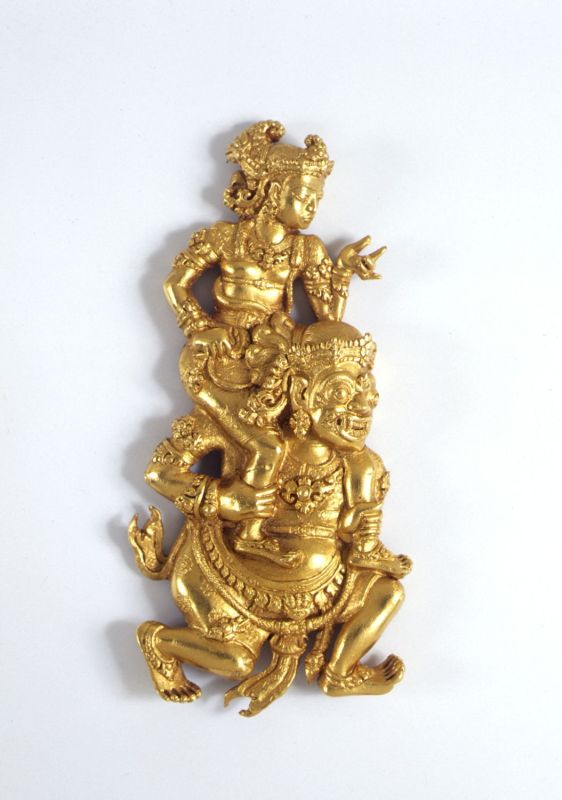
A figure of gold from the Majapahit period representing Sutasoma being borne by the man-eater Kalmasapada

The poem starts with a Bodhisattva reincarnated as Sutasoma, the son of the King of Hastinapura. As an adult, he was very pious and devout and did not wish to be married and crowned king. Therefore, Sutasoma fled from his father. When his absence was discovered, the palace was in tumult, this made his parents sad. When Sutasoma arrived in a forest, he prayed in a shrine. The Goddess Widyukarali appeared before him and told him that his prayers had been heard and would be granted. Sutasoma then climbed into the Himalayas in the company of several holy men, when they arrived at a certain hermitage, he was told a story of a king who had been reincarnated as a demon who liked eating humans.

In the court of the king, Purusada (or Kalmasapada), the meat set aside for the king was eaten by dogs and pigs. The chef was concerned, and hurriedly sought out alternatives, but could not find any. In desperation, he went to a graveyard cut off the leg of one of the corpses, and prepared it for his king. Because he had been reincarnated as a demon, he enjoyed the food, and he asked his chef what type of meat it was. The chef admitted it was human meat, and from that moment on, the king loved eating humans. Soon there were no people left in his kingdom, either he had eaten his subjects, or they had fled. Soon the king suffered a wound in his leg which would not heal, and he became more demonic and began to live in the jungle.

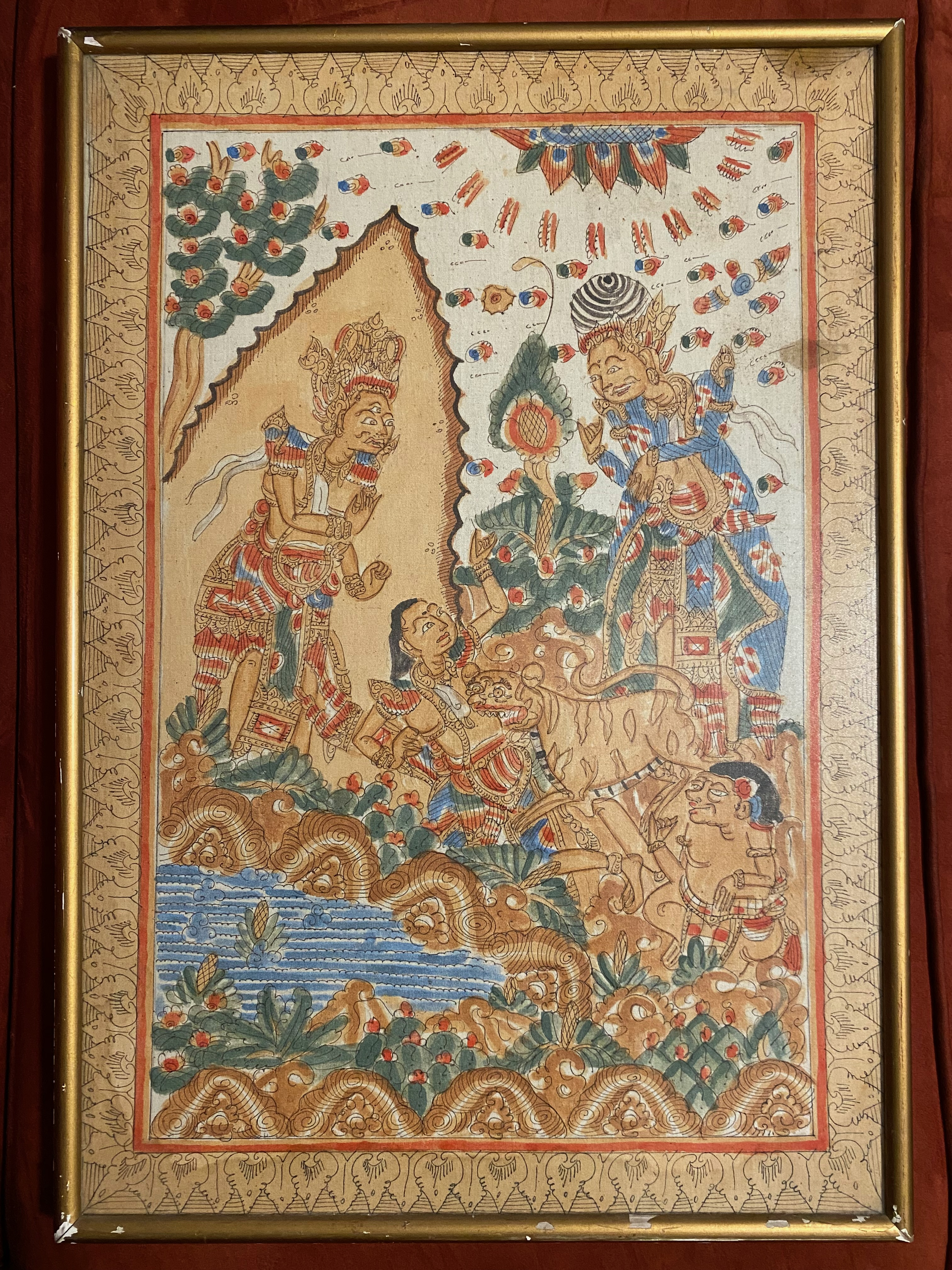
Traditional Balinese cloth painting (Story Cloth), framed depicting the story of Prince Sutasoma being devoured by a hungry tigress

By the time of Sutasoma's visit to the hermitage, the king had sworn that he would make an offering of 100 kings to the God Kala if he would cure him of his illness. The holy men begged Sutasoma to kill this demonic king, but he refused. Even the Goddess Prithvi beseeched him to kill the king, but he would not, since he wanted to be an ascetic. Later, he met a demon with an elephant's head who preyed upon humans. Sutasoma nearly became his victim, but he fought the beast and struck him down.

The demon surrendered and received a sermon from Sutasoma about Buddhism and that it is forbidden to kill any living creature. Afterward, the demon became Sutasomo's disciple. Later, he met a dragon and defeated it which also became his disciple. Finally, Sutasoma met a hungry tigress who preyed on her children, but Sutasoma stopped her and told her why she should not do that. However, the tigress persisted and Sutasoma offered his own body as food for the tigress. She jumped on him and sucked out his blood. The tigress realized she had done was wrong, and began to cry and repent. Then the God Indra appeared and made Sutasoma live again. The tigress also became his disciple, and they all continued the journey.

By this time, there was a war between the demon king Kalmasapada and King Dasabahu, a cousin of Sutasoma. King Dasabahu happened to meet with Sutasoma and invited him home so that he could marry his daughter. Sutasoma was married and returned home to Hastinapura. He had children and became King Sutasoma. Later, he gathered 100 kings to offer to the God Kala, but Kala did not want to accept them, instead he wanted Sutasoma to be offered instead. Purusada made war with Sutasoma, but because Sutasoma did not resist, he was captured and sacrificed to Kala. Sutasoma was prepared to be eaten so that the 100 kings could go free. Purusada was so affected by this sacrifice that he tried to atone for it, which resulted in the 100 kings being released.

== Publication ==
Between 1959 and 1961, I Gusti Bagus Sugriwa worked on an edition of the text which included the Old Javanese version of the text accompanied by a translation into Indonesian. It was also translated and published in English by Soewito Santoso. Extracts of the text were published in 1975. Another English translation was published in 2008 by Kate O'Brien.

There have been many extracts published in Bali, although they have Balinese characteristics and are translated into Balinese.
