= WikiConference India =

National Wikipedia conference

- Status: Active
- Venue: Kochi
- Locations: Kochi, India (4-6 September 2026)
- Inaugurated: 2011
- Most recent: 2026
- Previous event: WikiConference India 2026
- Filing status: Non-profit
- Website: Wiki Conference India 2026

WikiConference India is the national Wikipedia conference organised in India. The flagship conference took place in Mumbai, in 2011. The conference is organised with support of the Wikimedia Foundation and allied knowledge partners, and is open to participation from citizens of all nations. The focus is on matters concerning India on Wikipedia projects and other sister projects in English and other Indian folk languages. The fourth edition of the conference took place in Kochi, Kerala from 4 - 6 September 2026.

== History ==
=== 2011 ===
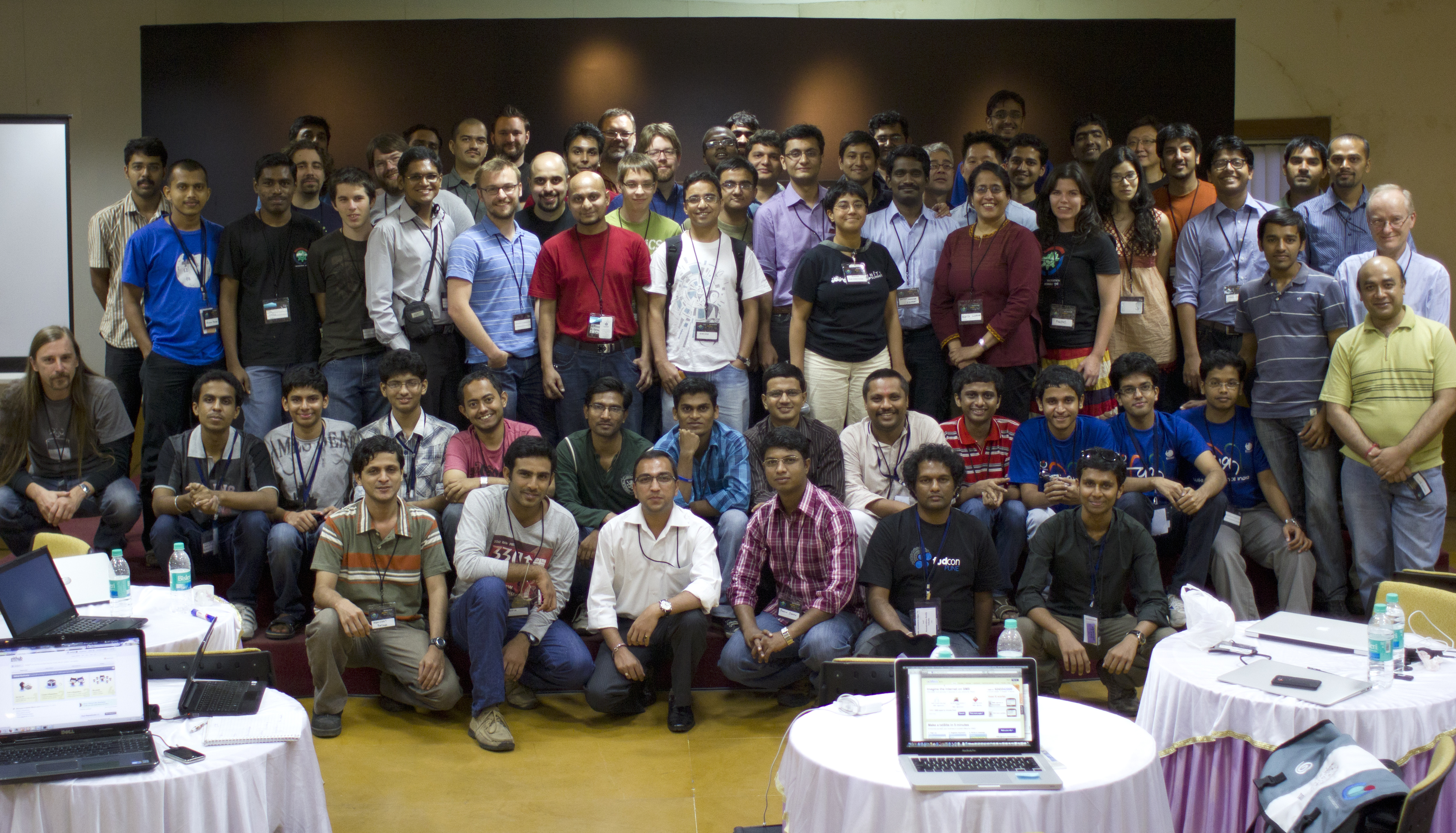
A Hackathon (attendees pictured) was held in concurrently with the conference.

WikiConference India aims to provide a common platform for all Indian Wikimedians to interact, share ideas and collaborate. The conference ran from 18 to 20 November 2011 and was held at Mumbai University in South Mumbai, the largest talks in the university's historic convocation hall.

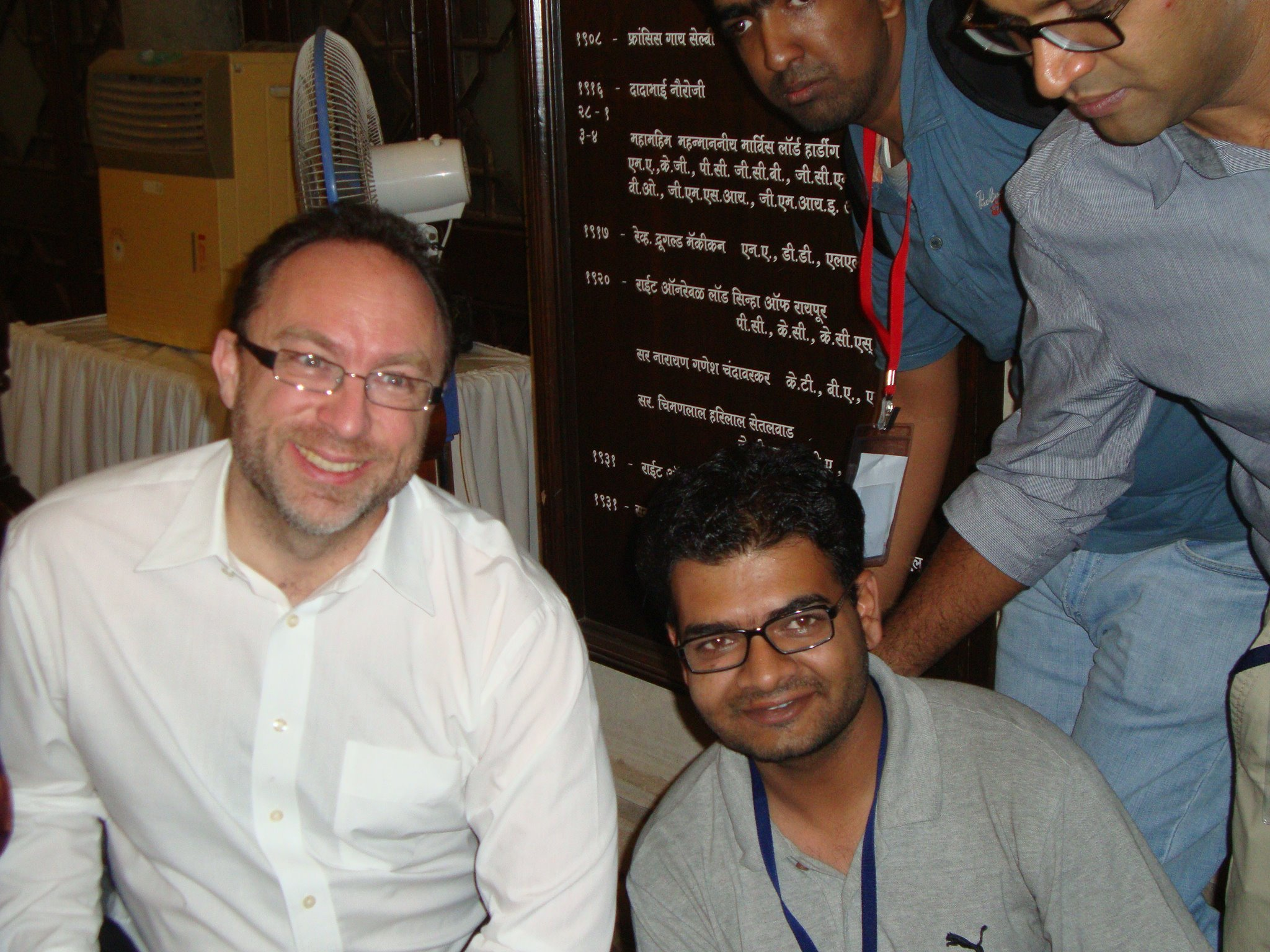
Jimmy Wales with one of the contributors to the Wikipedia before the Keynote address

The conference was inaugurated by a keynote address by Jimmy Wales. Arnab Goswami spoke on "Neutrality" as an invited guest speaker. Barry Newstead spoke on the last day.

Tracks showcased at the Conference included topics such as Wikipedia Impact, Gender Gap, Indic Language wiki track, MediaWiki Translation Sprint, Institutions and Wikipedia, Fair use Workshop, etc. It also included Editathon and WikiAcademy sessions. Various sessions on topics such as:

- Free knowledge and free content
- Legal Aspects of Wiki Culture
- Usage of Ajax and jQuery in Wiki
- Wiki Bhasha: Our Experiences with Multilingual Content
- Wiki Women Web: Bridging the Gender Gap
- GLAM (Galleries, libraries, archives and museums) project initiation in indic language Wikipedias

Concurrent with the conference was a Hackathon, hosted by the Maharashtra Chamber of Commerce, Industry and Agriculture (MACCIA) Kala Ghoda, South Mumbai. Other activities included a city tour and a Heritage walk. Wikimedians and non-Wikimedians from all over India and other countries, Wikimedia Foundation staff and co-founder A hundred applicants got scholarships based on their experience and contribution to Wikipedia and other projects. More than 700 people attended the conference. Microsoft Research, Omidyar Network, Kalnirnay, Yebhi.com, were the sponsors; and eRegNow.com, Avignyata Inc., Kores India Ltd., Text100, Digital Signage Networks (DSN) and Panache were the partners. There was a demonstration outside the conference by protesters against the map used by Wikipedia to show the borders of India.

=== 2016 ===
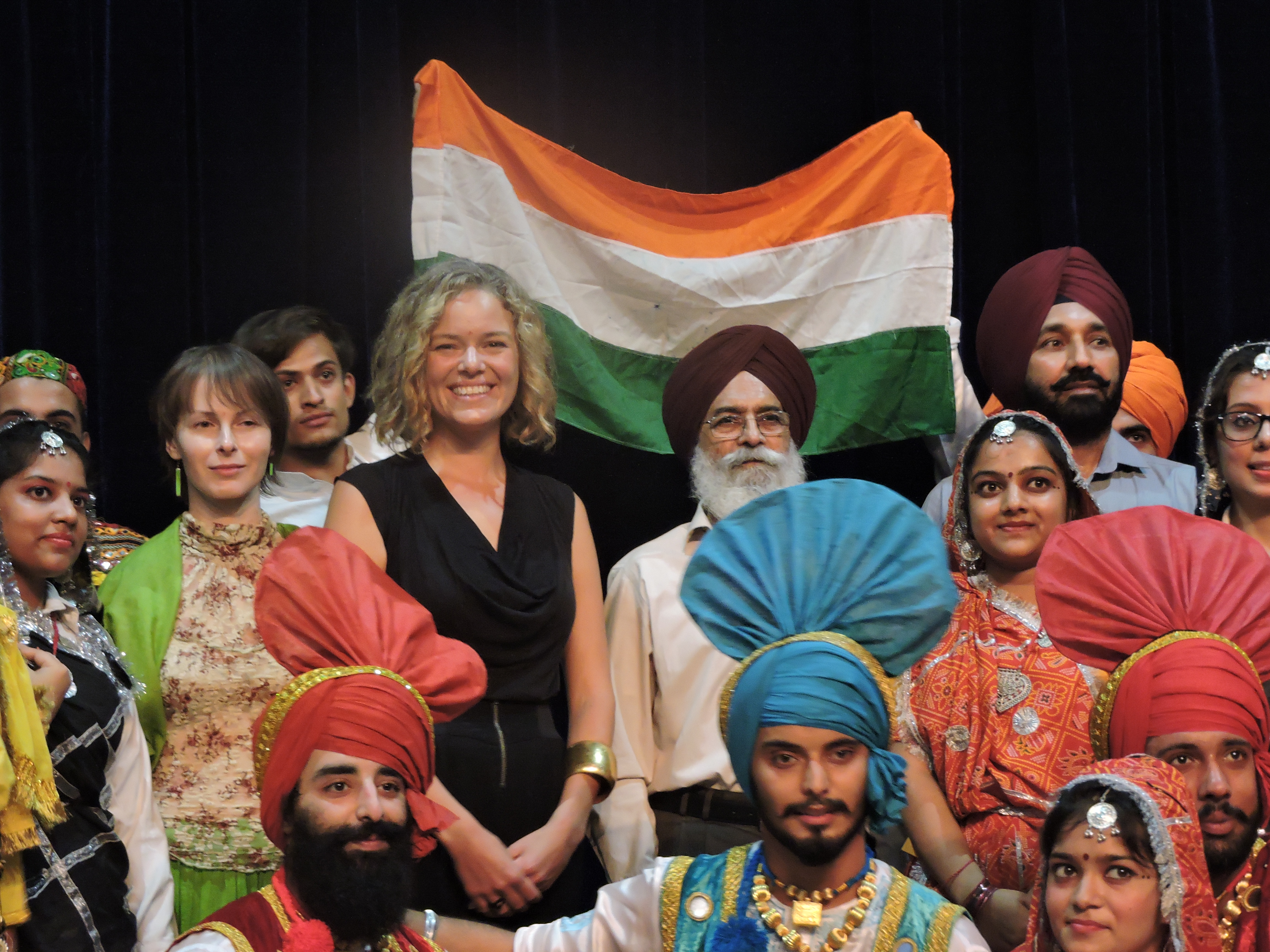
Katherine Maher and eminent poet Punjabi writer and poet late Surjit Patar with the cultural group

The second WikiConference India was held in Mohali, a city of Punjab State near Chandigarh. The venue of the Conference was CGC Landhran. Katherine Maher, Executive Director of WMF, and Nataliia Tymkiv, Board Member of WMF, attended this conference.

=== 2023 ===
WCI 2023 was a national-level conference that provided a common platform for Wikimedians and stakeholders interested in Indic-language Wikimedia projects and other aspects of the movement in India and a few South Asian regions. This was a space to meet, connect, share stories, learnings, best practices, and challenges, and discuss the future strategy of the region. The conference took place in Hyderabad from 28 to 30 April 2023.

=== 2026 ===
WCI 2026, the fourth edition of the national-level Wikimedia conference, took place in Kochi from 4 to 6 September 2026. It brought together Wikimedians and allied stakeholders engaged in Indic-language Wikimedia projects and the broader open knowledge movement across India and South Asia.

== See also ==
- Wikimania
- WikiConference North America
- Wiki Indaba
