= Irwan Prayitno =

Indonesian politician

Irwan Prayitno Datuak Rajo Bandaro Basa
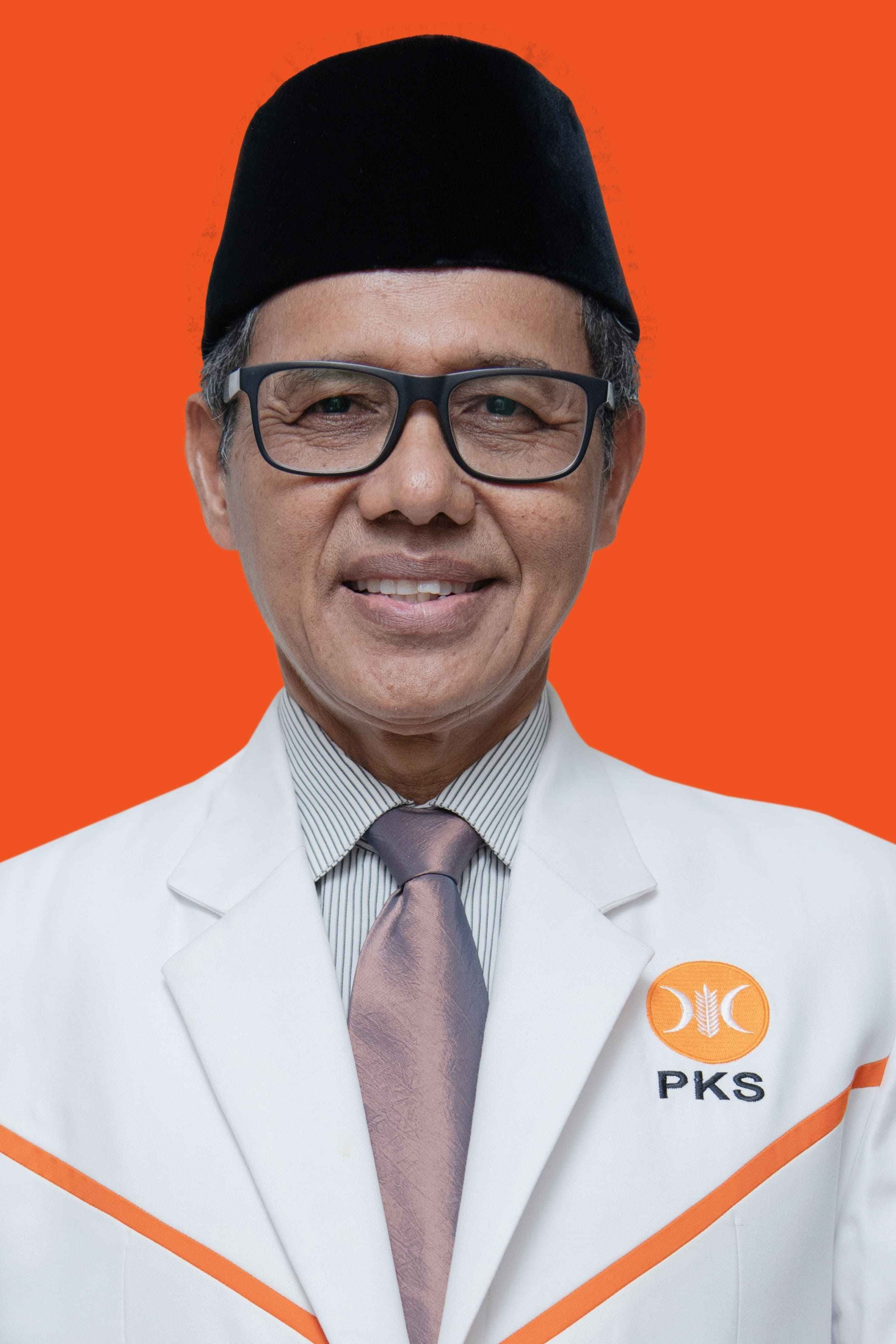

9th Governor of West Sumatra
- In office 15 August 2010 – 12 February 2021
- Lieutenant: Muslim Kasim; Nasrul Abit
- Preceded by: Marlis Rahman
- Succeeded by: Mahyeldi Ansharullah

Member of the People's Representative Council
- In office 1 October 1999 – 15 August 2010
- Succeeded by: Hermanto
- Constituency: West Sumatra (1999—2004); West Sumatra I (2004—2010)

Personal details
- Born: 20 December 1963 (age 62) Yogyakarta, Indonesia
- Party: PKS
- Spouse: Nevi Zuairina
- Children: 10
- Relatives: Adib Alfikri (younger brother)
- Education: University of Indonesia; University of Putra Malaysia
- Profession: Psychologist, academic, Politician
- Website: irwan-prayitno.com

Academic background
- Thesis: Pembinaan dan Aplikasi Pengukuran Psikologi dalam Model Pembangunan Sumber Manusia Bagi Sektor Industri di Indonesia (2000)
- Doctoral advisor: Azimi Hamzah, Sidek Mohd. Noah, & Khaidzir Ismail

Academic work
- Discipline: Psychology
- Sub-discipline: Industrial psychology

Irwan Prayitno (born 20 December 1963 in Yogyakarta, Indonesia), bearing the title Datuak Rajo Bandaro Basa or commonly known by his initials IP, is an Indonesian psychologist, academic, and politician. He served as the Governor of West Sumatra for two terms, following his victories in the 2010 and 2015 gubernatorial elections. Previously, he was a member of the People's Representative Council for three terms starting in 1999, representing the Prosperous Justice Party (PKS). He is known as the founder of the Adzkia Foundation, and he has remained active in teaching and Islamic preaching (da'wah) throughout his career.

Irwan completed his secondary education in Padang. He became involved as a da'wah activist while studying at the Faculty of Psychology at the University of Indonesia in 1982. Graduating in 1988, he returned to Padang to establish the Adzkia Education Foundation while working as a part-time human resources development consultant for various companies and as a lecturer in industrial psychology. Following the establishment of the Justice Party (PK) in 1998, Irwan formed and chaired the PK representation in Malaysia while pursuing his doctoral studies at University of Putra Malaysia. Through PK, which later became PKS, Irwan was elected as a member of the DPR representing West Sumatra for three terms following the 1999, 2004, and 2009 elections.

During his time in parliament, Irwan contributed his perspectives to the drafting of several bills, including the use of geothermal alternative energy. As a politician, he was noted for his lobbying skills and once turned down an offer to become a minister. Outside of parliament, Irwan is a professor of HR management at the Muhammadiyah University of Jakarta, an active writer, and continues his preaching. He is also an extraordinary professor of psychology at the State University of Padang (UNP).

Since 15 August 2010, he began serving as the Governor of West Sumatra, facing the devastation of public infrastructure and facilities following the 2009 earthquake, which impacted economic growth. The rehabilitation and reconstruction efforts under his leadership received appreciation from the central government.

Since August 2021, after completing his term as Governor of West Sumatra, Irwan became the Rector of Adzkia University on 30 September 2021. Currently, Irwan is a professor at the Indonesian International Islamic University (UIII) in the Faculty of Economics and Business since August 2024. Irwan also serves as the Chairman of the PKS Central Executive Board's Expert Council for the 2020-2025 term. Additionally, Irwan is on the management board of PB Inkanas and a Member of the Inkanas Board of Teachers, as a karateka holding a 7th Dan black belt.

== Background ==
Born in Yogyakarta on 20 December 1963, Irwan Prayitno is the first of four children to a Minangkabau couple, Djamrul Djamal (father) and Sudarni Sayuti (mother). His father is from Simabur, Tanah Datar, while his mother is from Nagari Pauh IX—which is now administratively part of Kuranji district, Padang. Despite his Minangkabau blood, Irwan's parents gave him a Javanese name rather than a Minangkabau name as a consequence of the Revolutionary Government of the Republic of Indonesia (PRRI) incident. Although not explicitly stated by his parents, Irwan suspects he was given a Javanese name to "quickly get a job" and because it possesses a good meaning.

His father and mother were both lecturers. They both graduated from PTAIN Yogyakarta (now Sunan Kalijaga State Islamic University Yogyakarta). After giving birth to their first child, the couple briefly settled in Semarang until Irwan was three years old, and moved to Cirebon when Irwan entered elementary school. After Irwan graduated from elementary school in Cirebon in 1976, they moved to Padang due to teaching duties at IAIN Imam Bonjol.

Later, Irwan was crowned as the penghulu of the Tanjung clan with the title Datuak Rajo Bandaro Basa in his mother's village, Kuranji. The title was previously held by Irwan's maternal uncle (ninik mamak), Saumar. The title inauguration ceremony took place on 13 February 2005, attended by Vice President Jusuf Kalla, MPR Chairman Hidayat Nur Wahid, and several ministers from the United Indonesia Cabinet.

== Education ==
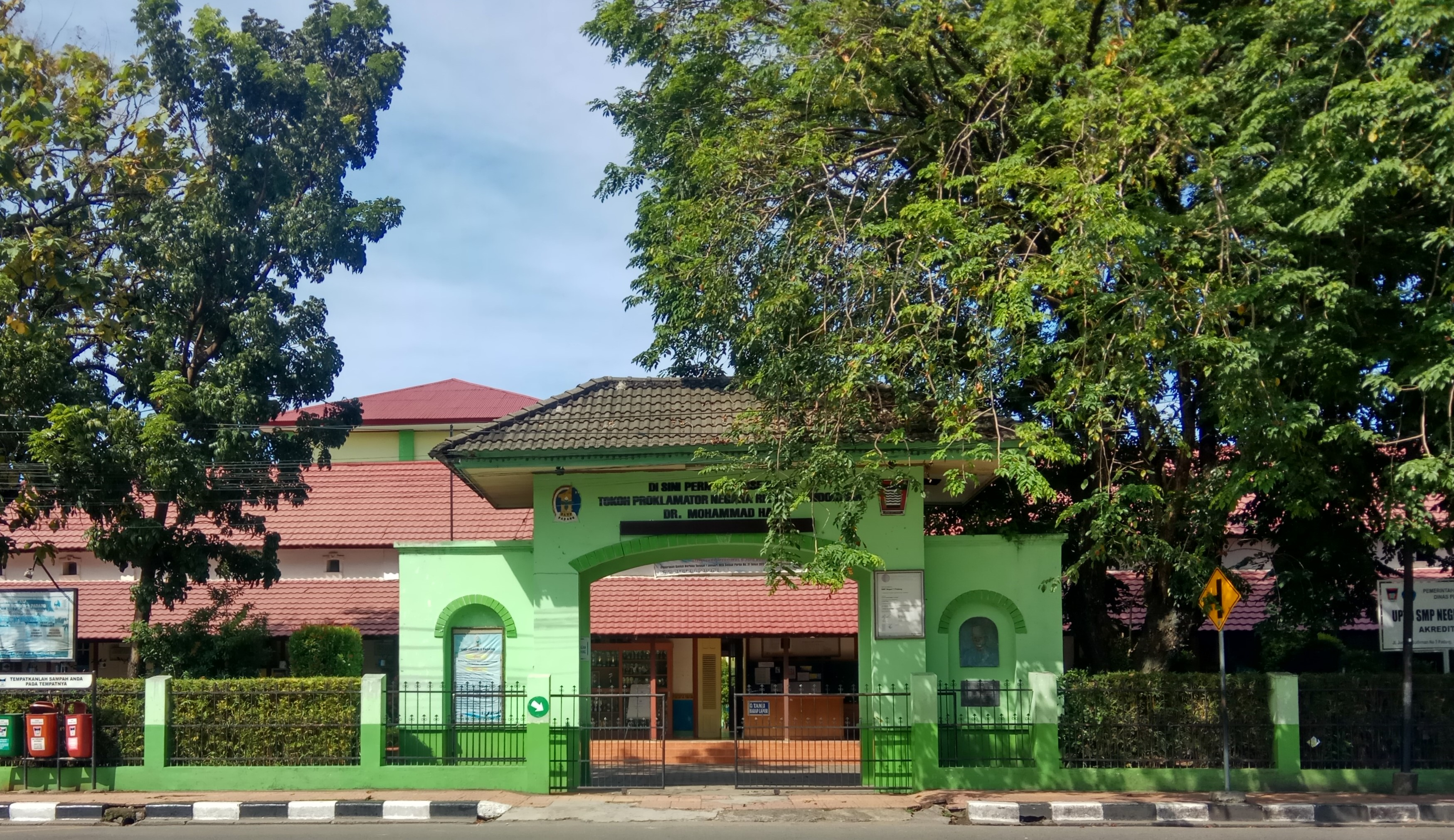
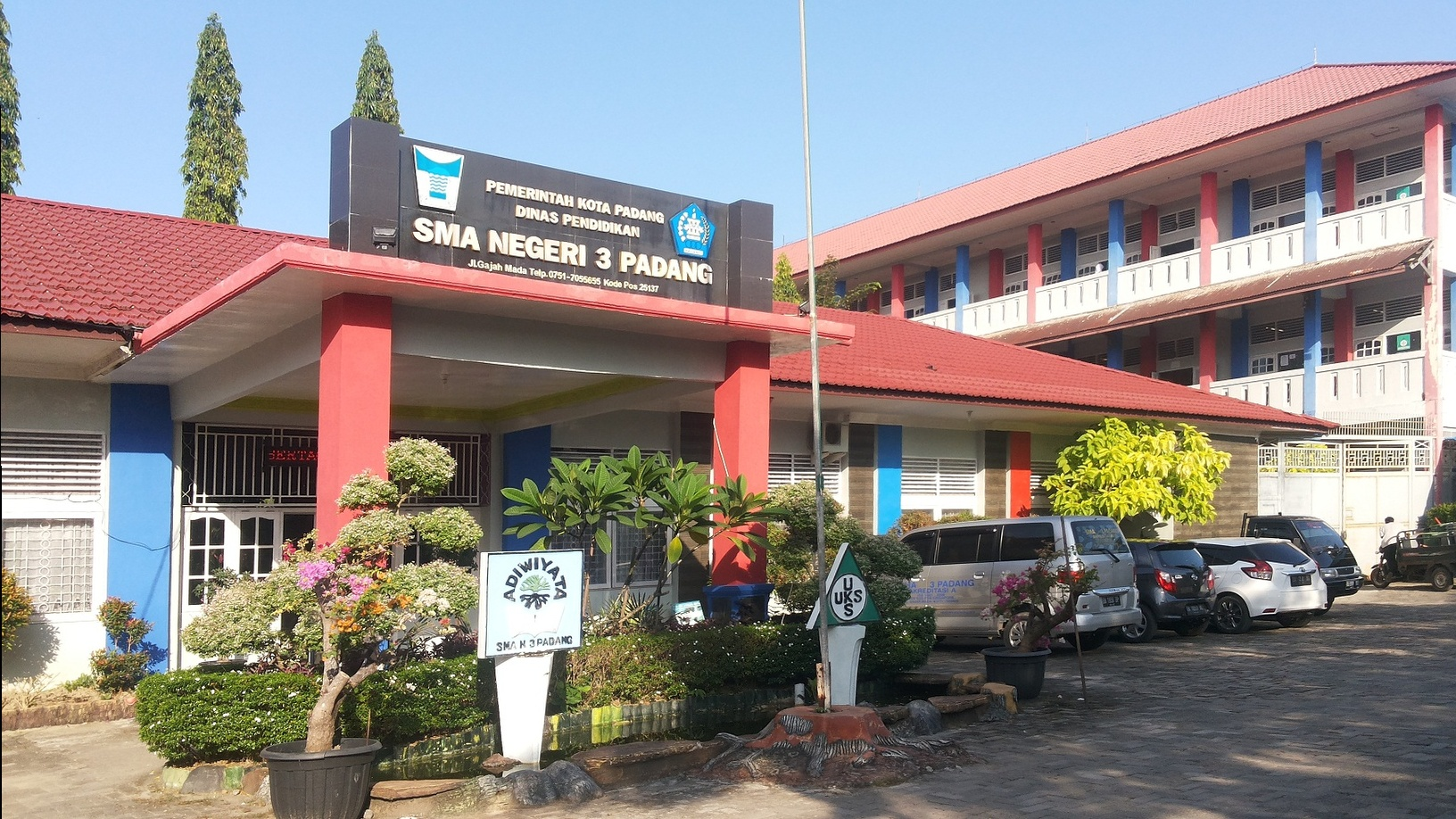
SMP Negeri 1 Padang (top) and SMA Negeri 3 Padang, Irwan Prayitno's alma mater

Irwan attended secondary education at SMP Negeri 1 Padang (1976–1979) and SMA Negeri 3 Padang (1979–1982). During high school, he became involved in organizational activities, joining the student council board in his second and third years. Throughout high school, he was always trusted as class president and achieved class valedictorian and overall valedictorian honors. Irwan initially wanted to continue his studies at the Bandung Institute of Technology (ITB) along with his friends. However, due to an eye problem, he changed his choice to the University of Indonesia (UI) and was accepted into the Faculty of Psychology.

In college, Irwan actively participated in Islamic discussions and student associations. He joined the Jakarta branch of the Muslim Students' Association (HMI). There, he experienced the repressive style of Suharto's New Order government towards Islamic movements. In 1984, he was appointed Chairman of the HMI Commissariat of the UI Faculty of Psychology. In 1986, following government intervention forcing the adoption of Pancasila as the sole ideology, HMI changed its basis to Pancasila; concurrently, Irwan resigned from his HMI membership. After that, he followed smaller-scale Islamic movements, shifting to campus mosques through Tarbiyah groups oriented towards the development of Islamic creed (aqidah) and morals (akhlaq).

Together with his friends, Irwan frequently attended halaqah/liqo. After two meetings of the Campus Da'wah Institution Gathering Forum in 1984, he was involved in socializing the LDK struggle guidelines or khittah, traveling to cities in West Sumatra. He met and found young preachers like Mahyeldi Ansharullah, Marfendi, and Rafdinal, who later became involved in the management of the Prosperous Justice Party (PKS).

During his studies, aside from keeping busy with various student activities, he spent a lot of time outside campus preaching, becoming a counselor at SMA Islam PB Sudirman Jakarta, SMP Muhammadiyah 39, and the Nurul Fikri tutoring center. Academically, he became a research assistant. In 1985, at the age of 22, Irwan married Nevi Zuairina, a UI chemistry student he met during his third semester. With his wife, Irwan continued to preach and was active in social and community activities. Irwan's busy schedule caused his studies to slow down. According to him, what he sought in education was not merely grades, but self-development. He completed his degree after six years with a low GPA of 2.02 because he had to divide his time to earn a living. Nevertheless, he was among the fastest graduates in his class. After graduating, Irwan and his wife's da'wah activities continued by developing da'wah activities at Andalas University and IKIP Padang (now State University of Padang).

== Founding Adzkia ==
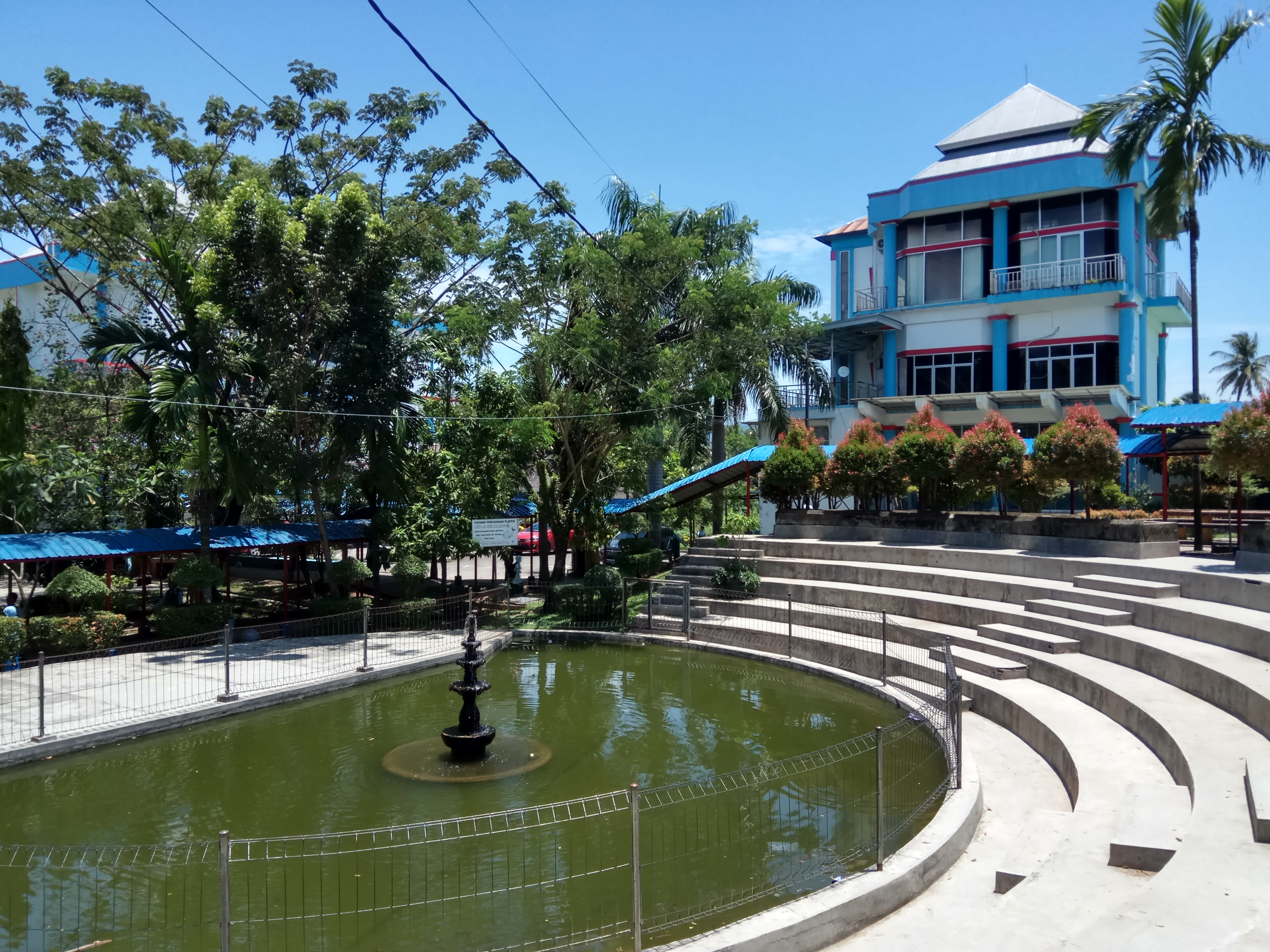
Park with an amphitheater in the Adzkia educational complex in Kuranji, Padang

After graduating from UI, Irwan decided to return to Padang to preach, teach courses, and work as a psychologist. He also taught as an industrial psychology lecturer at Aqabah, Bukittinggi and Andalas University, Padang. Meanwhile, he pioneered and established a foundation in the field of education with a capital of Rp15,000. Initially, Irwan opened the Adzkia tutoring course in Lolong in 1987 (the forerunner of PT Adzkia Masa Depan, which has at least 19 branches in Indonesia). At that time, he was assisted by Mahyeldi Ansharullah as manager and Syukri Arief as a teacher. In 1988, the course classes moved to the Islamic Teachers Association (PGAI) school complex in Jati. Starting from a tutoring course, Irwan formed the Adzkia Education Foundation which gradually accommodated kindergartens up to higher education. In 1994, Adzkia had a higher education level, in addition to kindergarten, elementary school, middle school, and vocational school. In fostering students, he poured the psychological knowledge he gained in college.

In 1992, he was accepted to continue his studies at the Agricultural and Mechanical College of Texas with the help of Nur Mahmudi Ismail, but because he failed to obtain a visa, he changed his choice to Malaysia. In 1995, Irwan took classes in Selangor, Malaysia while bringing his wife and children. However, due to his low GPA, his application was rejected several times. Undeterred, with the help of Prof. Sahrim Hj. Ahmad, he was finally accepted on probation. To the Rector of University of Putra Malaysia (UPM) Prof. Azimi Hamzah, he guaranteed he could complete his studies in three semesters. He took a master's degree in Human Resource Development at UPM, Selangor. Graduating one and a half years early in 1996, he continued his doctoral studies at the same campus.

Every day in Selangor, he had to work hard to take care of his family. At that time, he already had seven children. He and his wife shared the duties because there were no helpers. Irwan admitted that among his activities, he only allocated about 10 to 20 percent for college. His da'wah activities continued. In fact, he preached as far as London, England; Maryland, USA; Sydney and Perth, Australia. He had to do his coursework while traveling in cars, planes, or trains.

When he was nominated by the Justice Party as a legislative candidate for the DPR, Irwan was preparing for his final doctoral exams. Despite campaigning for the Tanah Datar electoral district in the 1999 Indonesian legislative election, he managed to complete his studies for a PhD with a cum laude GPA of 3.97 in 2000. Returning to Indonesia, he divided his duties in the legislature and his academic activities. Since 2003, he taught postgraduate programs at the Muhammadiyah University of Jakarta and was inaugurated as a professor on 1 September 2008. Until he became the Governor of West Sumatra since 2010, he still managed to teach 12 times in one semester.

== People's Representative Council ==
Irwan Prayitno when serving as a member of the People's Representative Council for the 1999–2004 period.

When the Justice Party was inaugurated on 20 July 1998, Irwan was appointed as the Chairman of the PK Representation in Malaysia. He was asked for his willingness to be nominated as a legislative candidate by PK representing the West Sumatra electoral district. Following the results of the 1999 Indonesian legislative election, PK only received 1.4 million votes or 1.7% of the total voters. PK secured seven cadres in the DPR, including himself. Together with the National Mandate Party (PAN) which gathered 37 DPR seats, the two parties joined to form the Reform Faction with Hatta Rajasa as chairman and Irwan Prayitno as vice chairman. The faction led Irwan to become the Chairman of Commission VIII. He led Commission VIII which among other things deals with energy and mineral resources issues. During his time in the DPR, Hatta admitted their faction was militant. A. M. Fatwa mentioned Irwan as the only commission chairman in the DPR who was irreplaceable for five years.

Approaching 1 April 2000, the government almost implemented an increase in fuel prices. Susilo Bambang Yudhoyono who was then serving as the Minister of Mines and Energy, called Irwan the night before the announcement of the fuel price increase, asking about the readiness for the fuel price hike. "I said, we in the DPR are not ready for that increase," Irwan recalled. On the announcement day 31 March 2000, President Abdurrahman Wahid decided to postpone the plan to raise fuel prices. After discussions with the DPR, the government officially enacted the fuel price hike on 1 October 2000.

As the government continued to reduce fuel subsidies since October 2000, Irwan proposed the use of geothermal energy as an alternative energy source by initiating the discussion of the draft bill through Commission VIII. According to him, the use of geothermal energy would help the government drive independence in energy supply, especially through power plants. "The use of geothermal energy allows the government not to be burdened by foreign currency as in the provision of fuel and avoids long-term oil dependence." However, the bill was initially ignored by the government because geothermal energy was considered expensive. He continued to lobby the executive to pass the bill, until the government finally ratified it into the Geothermal Law No. 27 of 2003. At that time, this law had not been followed up with a Government Regulation.

On 23 July 2001, Megawati Sukarnoputri ascended to the presidency, replacing Abdurrahman Wahid who was impeached. In the vice presidential election, PK nominated Hamzah Haz, preceding PPP's official stance. In an effort to gain support from parliament to back Hamzah, Irwan lobbied key figures from his faction such as Amien Rais, A. M. Fatwa, and Hatta Rajasa. Irwan even threatened to leave the faction if the faction did not support Hamzah Haz. Coinciding with Hamzah Haz's rise, Megawati appointed several cross-faction members as ministers. He was offered the position of Minister of Research and Technology, but out of party consideration he declined. This position was transferred to Hatta Rajasa, Irwan's faction and commission colleague.

Entering 2003, the government announced simultaneous increases in basic electricity tariffs (TDL), telephone tariffs, and fuel prices. The Reform Faction stated its insistence on canceling these three agendas. Irwan even threatened to walk out of the DPR along with six other Justice Party members if the simultaneous tariff hikes were still enforced. "Considering the public cannot bear the burden of the crisis, the alternative of cancellation is the most appropriate," Irwan said. In an interview with Republika, Irwan expressed his disappointment over the government's response which gave the impression as if the enforcement of the hikes had been approved by the council. "Let alone approving it, we didn't even discuss it. We were never invited to discuss the fuel price hike and when that decision could be implemented. The public has clearly been lied to," he stated. Although PK did not withdraw its members from parliament, the government responded by aborting the electricity and telephone tariff increases. Regarding his threat, Irwan called it a lesson for politicians and cadres. "If we are no longer able to guard the mandate and the aspirations of the people can no longer be heard, then it is only fitting that we step out of the DPR."

Irwan Prayitno when serving as a member of the People's Representative Council for the 2004–2009 period.

In the April 2004 legislative elections, Irwan was nominated by the party which had changed its name to PKS as a legislative candidate for the West Sumatra I electoral district. West Sumatra province sent two representatives to the DPR from PKS, namely him and Refrizal. During his second term in the DPR, he returned to chair the same commission until 2005 before moving commissions and being appointed as Chairman of Commission X starting in 2006. After leading the commission dealing with education issues, he confronted the government regarding the evaluation of the National Examination (UN) implementation. He criticized the UN implementation if it was only a determinant for student graduation, arguing that the UN results should be used for college admissions. He proposed the implementation of SPMB to recruit students free of charge. Irwan once argued that the implementation of student admissions should be handled autonomously by each respective university.

Approaching the 2004 Indonesian presidential election, Irwan, who from the beginning directed his support to Amien Rais, was appointed by the party to forge a coalition partnership with Amien. Irwan also carried the mission of securing Amien Rais's victory in West Sumatra. Amien received majority support in West Sumatra, but nationally lost the popular vote and failed to enter the second round of the presidential election. Towards the second round of the presidential election, Irwan convinced PKS to support Susilo Bambang Yudhoyono. In the government, Irwan and SBY had established a relationship in Irwan's capacity as Chairman of Commission VIII and SBY as Minister of Mines and Energy. Based on the vote recapitulation results, SBY received a unanimous 84.4% support from West Sumatra. Vice President-elect Jusuf Kalla noted that SBY had hoped Irwan would help strengthen the cabinet as Minister of Energy and Mineral Resources after the 2004 presidential election, but Irwan preferred to concentrate in the DPR. "This gave me the impression that brother Irwan carries out his duties well when entrusted and holds the mandate."

In the election of MPR leaders, Irwan Prayitno played a role in elevating Hidayat Nur Wahid to become MPR Chairman. Irwan's name had initially surfaced as a candidate for MPR Chairman, but Irwan declined his nomination. He was involved in drafting the MPR rules of procedure, proposing that candidates appear not individually but as a package with a 2-2 composition, two from the DPR and two from the DPD. The coalition where PK joined officially proposed Hidayat's package accompanied by three vice chairman candidates, namely A. M. Fatwa, Aksa Mahmud, and Mooryati Soedibyo. At that time, he was appointed to lead the lobby to all parties to support Hidayat. Hidayat was elected after receiving 326 votes, a two-point difference from the package proposed by the coalition backing Sutjipto.

In the 2009 general election, Irwan and Refrizal were re-elected representing West Sumatra. Irwan did not complete his third term after running as Governor of West Sumatra. The position he left was filled by Hermanto.

== Governor of West Sumatra ==
=== Nomination ===
Irwan Prayitno previously ran as a gubernatorial candidate for West Sumatra in the 2005 West Sumatra gubernatorial election. Along with his nomination, he left his party positions. Irwan ran accompanied by Ikasuma Hamid with parliamentary support from PKS and the Reform Star Party. Ikasuma Hamid is a former two-term Regent of Tanah Datar and an incumbent member of the West Sumatra DPRD. Irwan, who was 41 years old at the time, competed with Jeffrie Geovanie who was four years younger, and Gamawan Fauzi who was 46 years old. In the election contested by five candidate pairs, Irwan and his running mate recorded 25.11% of the vote. The vote recapitulation showed Gamawan Fauzi's victory, with Irwan Prayitno in second place, and Jeffrie Geovanie in third.

Despite receiving fewer votes than elected governor Gamawan Fauzi, Irwan initially had no plans to run again in the 2010 West Sumatra gubernatorial election. He was suddenly asked by the PKS Central Executive Board (DPP) to run, two days before the registration deadline. Irwan admitted he was somewhat angry because PKS had previously prepared its cadre, West Sumatra DPRD Vice Chairman Trinda Farhan Satria. After several refusals, the PKS West Sumatra Regional Executive Board (DPW) came directly to ask Irwan in Jakarta. "I still refused, because the party at that time only ordered me to become an ambassador. I moved to Commission I at that time to prepare to be an ambassador," Irwan admitted as quoted by KlikSumbar news release.

Previously, PKS had planned to nominate Trinda Farhan Satria and had aggressively promoted him as a candidate for vice governor, but canceled because they could not secure a coalition partner. Irwan finally declared to run in the election as a candidate for Governor of West Sumatra after the PKS DPP asked for his willingness to be nominated again. With the support of PKS, PBR, and the Hanura Party, Irwan ran with his running mate Muslim Kasim, who was a former two-term Regent of Padang Pariaman. Irwan, who arrived in Padang on the afternoon of the last day of registration, 8 April 2010, together with Muslim registered at the West Sumatra General Election Commission (KPU) office, 50 minutes before the end of the registration period. In the 2010 general election, Irwan competed with Ediwarman and Marlis Rahman who had academic backgrounds, Fauzi Bahar who was then the Mayor of Padang, and an economist Endang Irzal.

Irwan was officially declared as the governor-elect after garnering 32.44% of the votes. He was recorded as the first Governor of West Sumatra originating from a political party. Together with his deputy Muslim Kasim, Irwan was inaugurated as Governor of West Sumatra on Sunday, 15 August 2010 by the Minister of Home Affairs Gamawan Fauzi on behalf of the President of the Republic of Indonesia. The inauguration took place in the former car garage room of the West Sumatra DPRD because the main building was severely damaged by the earthquake.

=== First term ===
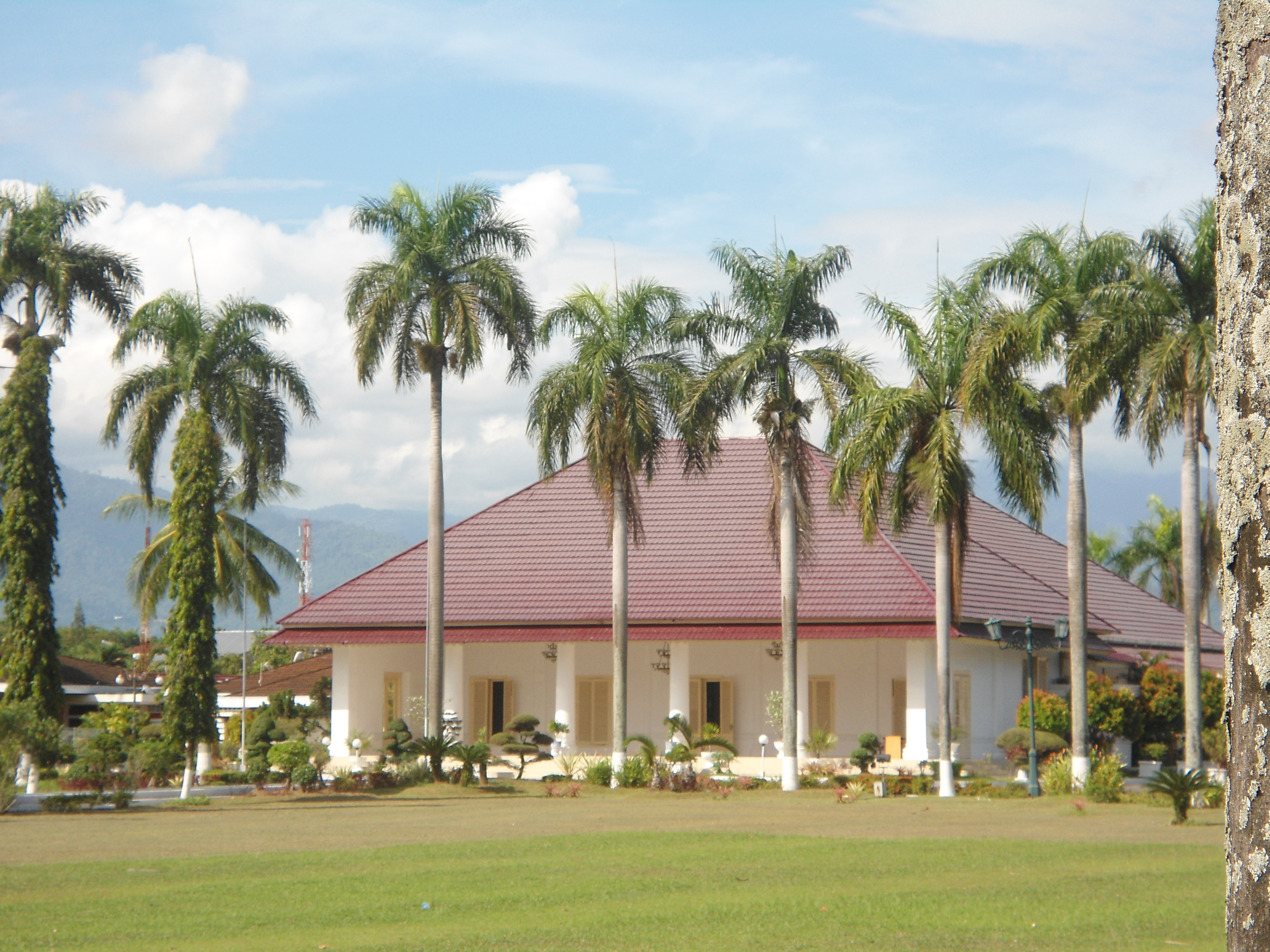
Gubernuran on Sudirman street, Padang, the official residence and office of the Governor of West Sumatra Irwan Prayitno.

Irwan was inaugurated as governor on 15 August 2010, less than eleven months after an earthquake shook West Sumatra. The inauguration of the governor and vice governor-elect took place in the garage room of the West Sumatra DPRD. Undergoing his first term, Irwan led the spatial planning of a province devastated after the disaster. Through Irwan's policies, the rehabilitation and reconstruction of residential houses and public facilities received priority over the construction of government buildings. In 2011, the National Agency for Disaster Countermeasure (BNPB) awarded the "best" award for the emergency response carried out by the provincial government. Three years after the disaster, a total of 197,636 damaged residential houses had been rehabilitated and reconstructed so that BNPB in 2013 presented the "fastest" rehabilitation and reconstruction award to the provincial government.

During his first term of leadership, Irwan turned his official residence into an office. Irwan admitted that post-earthquake, many SKPDs (Regional Working Unit) temporarily operated in emergency rooms and were piled into one room. When the new office for the governor was ready to be occupied at the end of 2013, Irwan diverted its use for the SKPDs that were still crowded into the Gubernuran hall. Construction of new government buildings began in 2013, while repairs to the old governor's office followed at the end of 2014. As he entered his second term as governor, Irwan had still not occupied the official office, waiting for the retrofit of the old governor's office to be completed.

Local daily Padang Ekspres in its 15 August 2014 edition listed at least 137 awards achieved on behalf of the West Sumatra provincial government over the past four years. A number of awards for 2013 were handed over separately throughout the first half of 2014. On 13 May 2014, West Sumatra received an Unqualified opinion (WTP) from the BPK on the West Sumatra Regional Government Financial Report (LKPD) of 2013. This was for the second time after the previous year's LKPD received a similar opinion. On 24 February 2014, the government presented the Budget Absorption Evaluation and Supervision Team award. With a satisfactory predicate of three, West Sumatra's financial realization achievement ranked 6th nationally. In the implementation of the 2013 APBD, budget realization reached 98.92% of the Rp3.182 trillion target, while the absorption of Original Regional Revenue (PAD) exceeded the target, at 102.42%, which was Rp1.366 trillion from the target of Rp1.334 trillion.

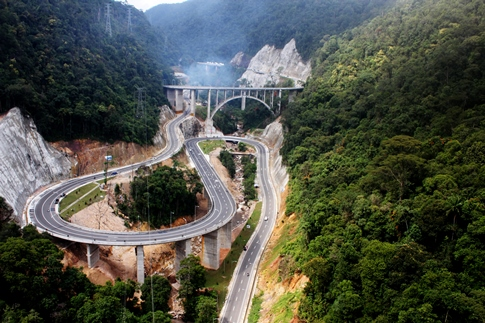
Kelok 9 overpass, inaugurated for use by President Susilo Bambang Yudhoyono in October 2013

In the infrastructure sector, Minister of Public Works Djoko Kirmanto once stated that infrastructure in West Sumatra was the best compared to other provinces in Indonesia. Data for 2013 revealed that national road stability touched 95.32%, drinking water service achievement reached 62.52%, and settlement sanitation service coverage was 45.58%. From the Ministry of Social Affairs, West Sumatra received the Social Solidarity Charter award for the implementation of social welfare programs on 7 March 2014. The poverty rate percentage continued to drop since 2010 from 9.5% to 7.5% in 2013. The province's Human Development Index score is 74.70 or ranked 9th nationally. From the Ministry of Industry, the government handed over the second-place national award in increasing the use of domestic products in October 2014.

On 18 July 2014, West Sumatra earned the best national predicate with the highest score in compliance with Law Number 25 of 2009 concerning "Public Services" from the Ombudsman RI. The award was received by Governor Irwan Prayitno from Coordinating Minister for Political, Legal, and Security Affairs Djoko Suyanto in Jakarta. Ombudsman Chairman Danang Girindrawardana had conveyed the assessment results when meeting Irwan at the Gubernuran on 15 May 2014. Irwan as the regional head was deemed to have a responsive attitude and commitment to realizing the needs and public service system in accordance with the law. Previously, the National Civil Service Agency included West Sumatra as the best province in the implementation of the 2013 CPNS recruitment with the Computer Assisted Test (CAT) system.

From the Ministry of Tourism, West Sumatra received the highest award in the tourism sector, The Most Improved Travel Club Tourism Award, on 20 November 2014. Previously, West Sumatra won one category of the National Procurement Award 2014 from the Ministry of National Development Planning for the role of the province's LPSE. On 8 December 2014, the Minister of Culture, Primary and Secondary Education Anies Baswedan awarded the 2014 Inclusive Award for the implementation of inclusive education in regions of West Sumatra. On 10 December, Minister of Trade Rachmat Gobel presented a certificate of appreciation for West Sumatra's participation in supporting the Formation of Orderly Measuring Regions and Orderly Measuring Markets activities.

As governor, Irwan played a role in improving coordination among regional governments and lobbying the central government to obtain budget support. In a coordination meeting of regional heads throughout West Sumatra on 3 March 2014, a request emerged for a budget of Rp8.8 trillion to the central government for the implementation of priority development in West Sumatra. After a joint meeting with the Ministry of Public Works on 6 May 2014, Minister of Public Works Djoko Kirmanto approved a budget allocation to accelerate infrastructure development. Through the Ministry of Public Works, the government disbursed Rp3 trillion over three fiscal years 2014–2016 for the acceleration of infrastructure development in West Sumatra.

Geothermal Power Station (PLTP) in Muara Labuh, South Solok, West Sumatra

In addition to receiving numerous awards for the province, Irwan received an award from the state as a regional head. On 12 October 2012, Irwan received the Prabawa award from the Ministry of Energy and Mineral Resources for his attention and commitment to the development of renewable energy (EBT) potential. Having handled energy and mineral resource issues while in the DPR, Irwan paid attention to the development of new and renewable energy as an alternative energy source for electricity development in West Sumatra. In an effort to accelerate geothermal energy empowerment, he as the regional head collaborated with several countries to bring in investors, facilitated the inventory of EBT potential, research, and promotion. Besides delivering EBT utilization policies to the West Sumatra legislature, he encouraged regional heads to develop EBT autonomously. Currently, West Sumatra has a one-stop integrated service unit to facilitate investment licensing. Regarding geothermal management, West Sumatra has Regional Regulation Number 7 of 2012, followed by a legal umbrella for electricity provision in Regional Regulation Number 2 of 2013. (Note: Located in an active volcano belt with hilly topography where many rivers originate, West Sumatra has the potential for geothermal energy, hydropower sources, and solar energy simultaneously due to its location facing the ocean under the equator line. Data from the Directorate of Mineral Resources Inventory in 2013 revealed that there is geothermal potential with an estimated 1,656 Megawatts in West Sumatra spread across 16 points. Five of them are being tested while one point is entering exploration works in South Solok Regency. Specifically, wave and wind power energy are being empowered in the Mentawai Islands area through cooperation with Germany.)

On 29 November 2013, Irwan received the Adhikarya Pangan Nusantara Award, the highest award from the National Food Security Council. In achieving food security, some of the programs run by Irwan included increasing farmers' working hours by adding business branches. The food diversity of West Sumatra recorded a Desirable Dietary Pattern (PPH) score reaching 77.50. From the National Library, Irwan won the Nugra Jasadarma Pustaloka award on 29 October 2013. He was considered to give extra portion to reading interest, through his efforts to find a replacement building for the regional library destroyed post-earthquake. On 27 November 2013, Irwan received an award from Minister of Trade Gita Wirjawan as a regional head for his attention and concern towards consumer protection. At the end of 2014, the Ministry of Women Empowerment and Child Protection awarded the Anugerah Parahita Ekapraya (APE) 2014 to the Governor of West Sumatra.

=== Leadership style ===
Irwan asked anyone not to force him to change according to protocol provisions. "Do not force me to change my lifestyle, because to me any position facilities are sunnah (optional), authority is instead an obligation for me," he said. Rather than using the available budget, Irwan optimized the use of existing facilities. He rejected suggestions to buy a new official car and still occupied the old official residence. When presented with the reason to cover up shame towards ministers or other state officials who came to visit, Irwan preferred to use his private car to be made into a red-plate car (official vehicle). During the reconstruction of government offices severely damaged by the 30 September 2009 earthquake, a budget was allocated for the construction of a new office for the governor. However, Irwan diverted its use for three SKPDs whose offices were damaged, choosing to work temporarily in the old official residence on Jalan Sudirman.

On 22 January 2014, a student with a drawn knife entered the West Sumatra Governor's Office, threatening to kill the governor. Escaping the guarding of the on-duty Satpol PP, the student, who was later identified as an ITB graduate, managed to go up to the second floor of the building while shouting before leaving the building's courtyard driving a car. After examination by the police the following week, the perpetrator was handed over to his family for medical treatment because he was proven to suffer from a mental disorder. Regarding this incident, Irwan was understanding, "The security at the governor's office and official residence is indeed intentionally made minimalist and minimal in protocol." However, the seven Satpol PP officers on duty on the day of the incident were still sanctioned for negligence in carrying out their duties.

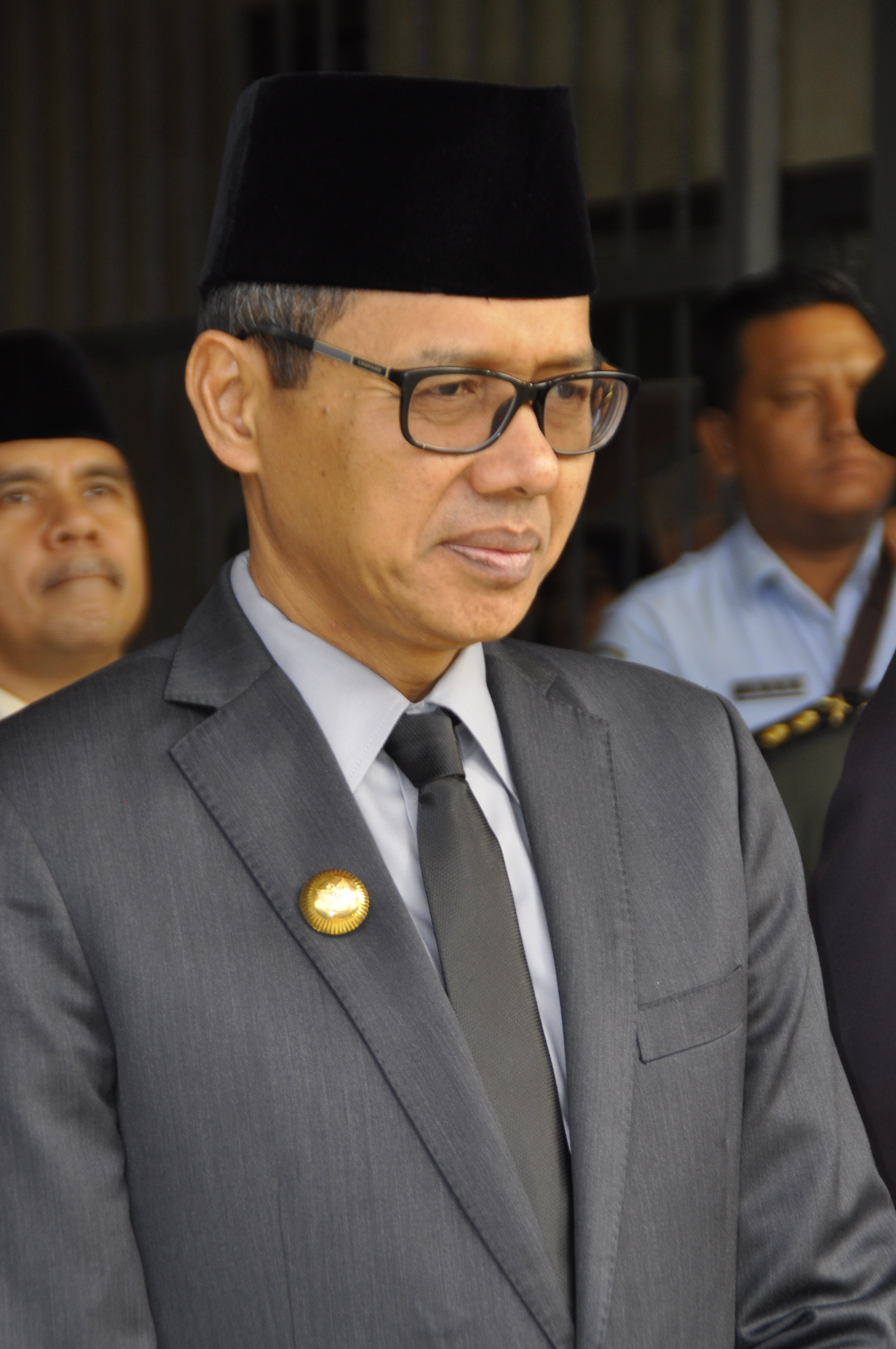
Irwan Prayitno with the badge on his chest which he rarely wears except when at the office or receiving guests for official business

In traveling outside the province, Irwan never chose specific airlines. He always chose and felt comfortable sitting in economy class. Poet Taufiq Ismail, who once found Irwan on the same flight in economy class, deemed it a special thing and an exemplary act. During the beginning of his five-year term, Irwan almost never wore the official badge of office on his chest. This became a spotlight in the media, until it was questioned by Fauzi Bahar during the candidate debate for the 2015 gubernatorial election. Irwan was accused of not appreciating and respecting state symbols, because the position of governor is considered among the symbols of the state. Regarding his simple appearance, without attributes and minimal protocol, Irwan stated he did not want there to be a barrier between him and the community. He admitted he could freely hear the public's complaints "without the public feeling hesitant to criticize the governor, even though they were talking to the governor."

Yongki Salmeno, who is close to Irwan Prayitno, wrote about his experiences with Irwan. He found Irwan's character wanting things to be fast and on time. Whenever making visits to the regions, the governor's entourage almost raced at high speed. Yongki found several SKPDs trying to avoid joining the governor's motorcade because they lacked the nerve. Irwan believed in the principle that it was better to arrive early than late. Within the city, he refused to use an escort car unless it was urgent. "Often the event host is still waiting for the governor's arrival by listening for the siren of the escort car. It turns out the siren is never heard, the governor has arrived on time without an escort and is instead already sitting with them," wrote Yongki.

Irwan continued to preach while serving as governor. Twice a month every Friday morning, he led a weekly recitation (wirid) attended by the ranks of the West Sumatra Provincial Government employees. The recitation activities were centered at the Grand Mosque of West Sumatra since early 2012, even though at that time the use of the mosque had not been officially inaugurated. During June and the fasting month of Ramadan in 2014, he gave tausiah (sermons) during visits to government agencies.

Irwan used his spare time for his family and sports. Irwan is fond of badminton, karate, and trail running. His free time is sometimes used to play music. He admitted he could sing since 2012. "Because as a governor I am often put on the spot to sing, I finally learned to sing." In Ramadhan 2013, he composed a song titled "Kau Istriku" and uploaded it via his official account on YouTube. "I saw at the Gubernuran there were many musical instruments left by previous governors, so I utilized them to try practicing. Even though I had never learned musical notes, scales and so on before," he said, revealing the beginning of his interest in playing music. Irwan has registered two of his songs, the other titled "Kepada-Mu", to the Regional Office of the Ministry of Law and Human Rights in West Sumatra.

=== Controversy ===
West Sumatra Governor's Office or nicknamed Rumah Bagonjong, facing the Gubernuran on Sudirman street, Padang

In early November 2010, Irwan as Governor of West Sumatra fulfilled the invitation of the Indonesian Embassy in Berlin to appear as a speaker outlining Indonesia's investment potential in a forum commemorating the bilateral relations of the two countries. At the same time, the emergency response period for the Mentawai tsunami was still ongoing. The tsunami struck the Mentawai Islands following an earthquake centered off the coast of West Sumatra on 25 October 2010. National media immediately raised opinions regarding Irwan's departure. The news site Kompas ran the headline "Citizens Are Starving, Governor Goes to Germany". Tempo quoted the opinion of political observer Burhanuddin Muhtadi who said the Governor of West Sumatra was insensitive. Member of the DPR Budiman Sudjatmiko commented, it was inappropriate for a regional head to leave their region hit by a disaster and proposed his commission to summon Irwan Prayitno, but it was canceled.

Prior to his departure, Irwan had been back and forth to Mentawai leading disaster management and had spent three nights at the refugee camps. In a one-and-a-half-day visit on 4–5 November, Irwan took the time to sign a cooperation agreement in investment, particularly in the tourism and renewable energy sectors, with the Bavarian Government. Irwan returned to Mentawai on the same day after landing in Padang. The Tempo newspaper ran the story "After Being Criticized, Irwan Prayitno Goes to Mentawai". Another DPR member, Nudirman Munir, deemed the media coverage of Irwan excessive. "The Governor spent three nights in Mentawai and it wasn't mentioned." Responding to the criticism directed at him, Irwan apologized, stating that the plan for his visit to Germany had been prepared long before the Mentawai tsunami.

During his tenure as governor, Irwan worked from his official residence. Irwan admitted that building houses and public facilities was a higher priority than building government offices. Rebuilding the severely damaged provincial department offices began in 2013, while retrofitting the governor's office only started at the end of 2014. This caught media attention ahead of the 2015 gubernatorial election, prompting opinions that "Irwan never goes to the office". He used his private home in Lubuk Kilangan as a temporary office. In his second term as governor beginning 12 February 2016, Irwan finally worked from the governor's office for the first time.

On 28 May 2018, Irwan sent a letter to the Minister of Communication and Information Technology Johnny G. Plate requesting the Ministry to remove a Minang-language Bible application created by Faith Comes by Hearing, citing consideration for the Islamic culture which is more closely aligned with West Sumatra. The banning of the Minang-language Bible drew plenty of criticism as well as support from the public.

== Personal life ==
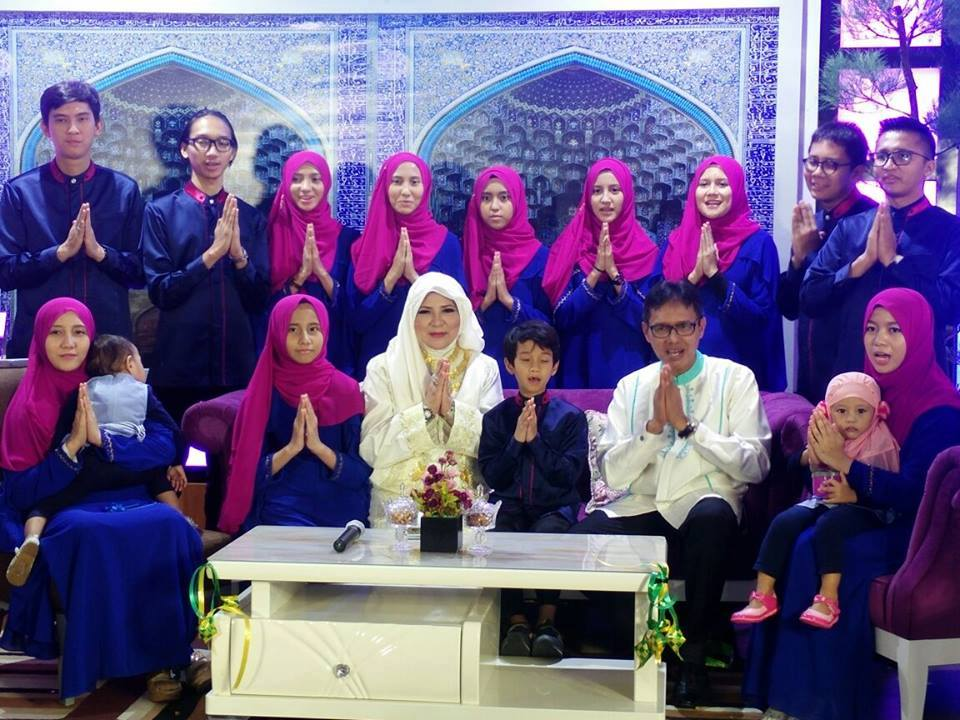
Irwan Prayitno and his family

Irwan Prayitno is married to Nevi Zuairina, who has successfully served as a Member of the Indonesian DPR from PKS since 2019. They were married in 1985 while both were still university students. Nevi was Irwan's junior at UI, studying in the Chemistry Department of FMIPA. From this marriage, they have been blessed with 10 children and 12 grandchildren (as of May 2023).

Their first child, Jundy Fadhillah, is an alumnus holding a Master of Business Administration (MBA) from Southern New Hampshire University, United States, who currently works in the private sector. The second child is Waviyatul Ahdi, a dental specialist who completed her undergraduate, professional education, and master's degree at the UI Faculty of Dentistry.

The third child, Dhiya’u Syahidah, is an alumna of the School of Business and Management at the Bandung Institute of Technology (ITB) and holds an MSc in Purchasing and Supply Chain Management from the University of Westminster, UK. Dhiya'u is currently the Director of Adzkia Day Care and Pre School in Jakarta.

The fourth child, Anwar Jundi, graduated with a bachelor's degree in Fisheries Engineering from IPB University and currently works as a private employee. The fifth child is Atika, who completed her bachelor's in Management at UI and her master's in Human Resource Management at the Melbourne University, Australia.

The sixth child, Ibrahim Irwan, is a Chemical Engineering alumnus from UI. Ibrahim followed in his parents' footsteps as a politician by joining PKS. The party nominated Ibrahim as a candidate for the Indonesian DPR from the West Sumatra I electoral district for the upcoming 2024 general election.

The seventh child, Shohwatul Ishlah, graduated with a medical degree from the Faculty of Medicine at Andalas University (Unand). The eighth child, Farhana, completed a dual degree bachelor's at the UI Faculty of Psychology and the Queensland University, as well as a master's degree at the London School of Economics and Political Science in London.

The ninth child, Laili Tanzila, previously studied at the Faculty of Engineering and the Faculty of Psychology at UI, as well as ESMOD Jakarta. Lastly, the youngest child, Taqiya Mafaza, pursued a bachelor's in Management at UI and is slated to graduate from Melbourne University, Australia (dual degree).

== Written works ==
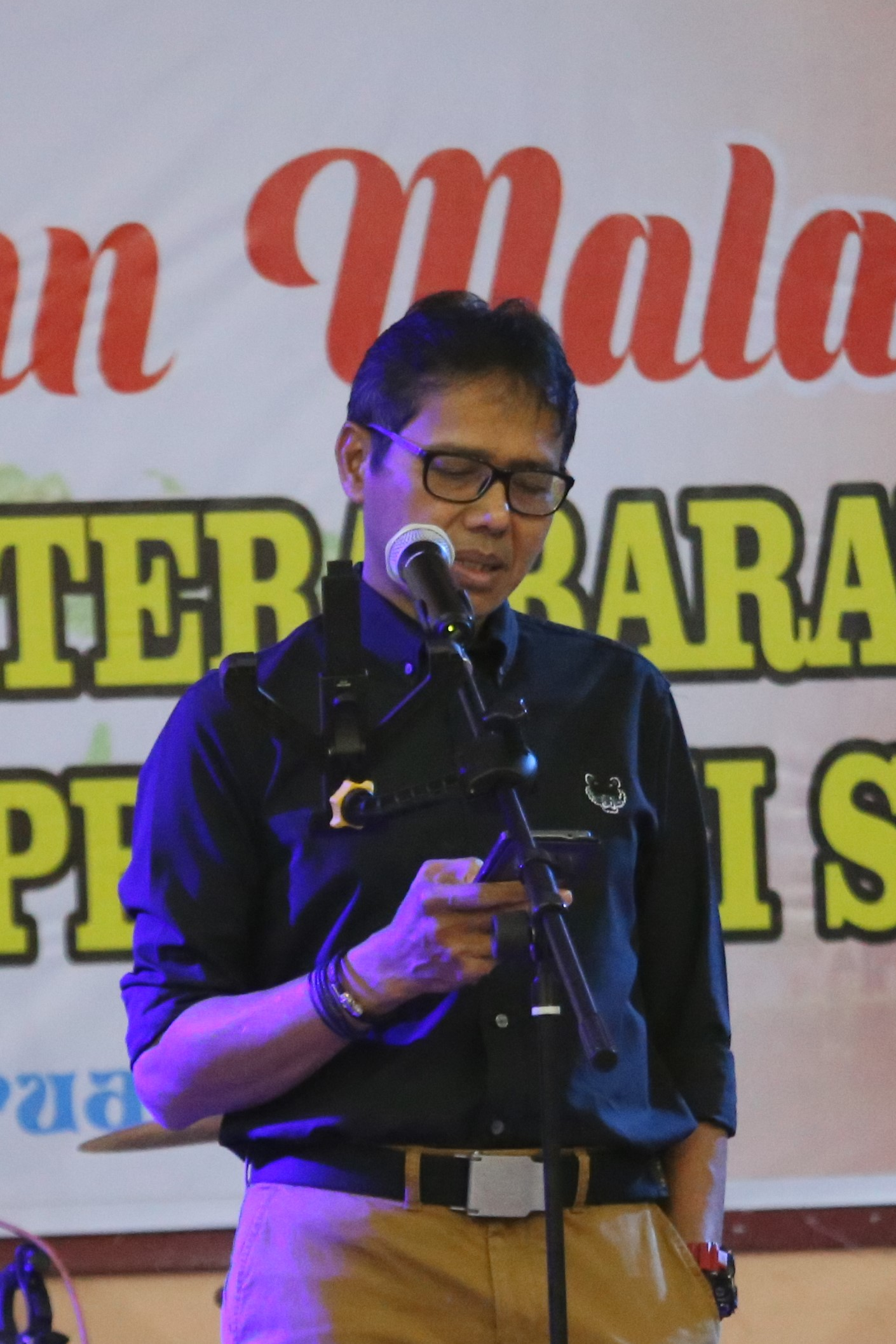
Among Irwan Prayitno's leadership styles is preserving the pantun, a classic Malay poetic form, when giving speeches.

By 2022, Irwan had completed 81 book titles and at least 25 research papers. At the end of the year, he published a book titled Inspirasi Untuk Negeri. Over 116 of his articles have been published in various mass media. Having a track record as an Islamic da'wah activist and a background in psychology, his works cover issues of children and family, HR management, politics, and da'wah. His works are widely used as references by Islamic movement activists in various public universities across Indonesia. On 11 November 2015, two books containing a compilation of writings by local and national media journalists regarding Irwan's leadership were launched.

Since February 2016, Irwan Prayitno has created as many as 60,000 pantuns compiled in a 30-volume book named Pantun Spontan ala IP. In 2017, he began publishing these pantuns in book form.

The following is a list of published books he has written:

- Pantun Spontan ala Irwan Praytno (30 volumes)
- Mari Membaca Pantun Nasihat Pernikahan (2018)
- Inspirasi Untuk Negeri (2013)
- Pemikiran Menuju Masyarakat Madani (2005)
- Anakku Penyejuk Hatiku (2004)
- Kepribadian Muslim (2003)
- Kepribadian Dai (2003)
- Pemuda Islam Generasi Penerus (2003)
- Wanita Islam Perubah Bangsa (2003)
- Mengkritisi Kebijakan Pemerintah (2003)
- Dai di Tengah Kegalauan Politik (2003)
- Dilema Kebijakan Energi (2003)

== Electoral history ==
Election	Legislative body	Electoral district	Political party	Votes	Result	Ref.
1999	People's Representative Council	West Sumatra	Prosperous Justice Party	Unknown	Elected	
2004	People's Representative Council	West Sumatra I	Prosperous Justice Party	46,677	Elected	
2009	People's Representative Council	West Sumatra I	Prosperous Justice Party	57,199	Elected	
2024	People's Representative Council	North Sumatra III	Prosperous Justice Party	41,008	Not elected	

Local election	Executive body	Electoral district	Political party	Votes	Result	Ref.
2005	Governor of West Sumatra	West Sumatra	Prosperous Justice Party	446,996 (24.50%)	Not elected	
2010	Governor of West Sumatra	West Sumatra	Prosperous Justice Party	657,763 (32.44%)	Elected	
2015	Governor of West Sumatra	West Sumatra	Prosperous Justice Party	1,175,858 (58.62%)	Elected	

== Honours ==
- Satyalancana Pembangunan (Medal for Contributing in the National Development) - 2017
- Satyalancana Wira Karya (Medal for Providing an Example of Meritorious Personality) - 2017
- Manggala Karya Kencana (Medal of Population and Family Development) - 2013
- Satyalancana Karya Satya (Medal of Civil Servants' Long Service of 30 years), 1st Class
- Satyalancana Karya Satya (Medal of Civil Servants' Long Service of 20 years), 2nd Class
- Satyalancana Karya Satya (Medal of Civil Servants' Long Service of 10 years), 3rd Class
- Lencana Melati (Badge of Melati)
- Lencana Darma Bakti (Badge of Darma Melati)
- Lencana Pancawarsa I (Badge of Pancawarsa I)

== Notes ==
Political offices
Preceded by Reydonnyzar Moenek as Acting Governor	Governor of West Sumatra; 2016–2021	Succeeded by Mahyeldi
Preceded by Marlis Rahman	Governor of West Sumatra; 2010–2015	Succeeded by Reydonnyzar Moenek as Acting Governor
