= 2020 West Sumatra gubernatorial election =

West Sumatra regional head election

- 9 December 2020
- Registered: 3,719,429
- Turnout: 62.19%
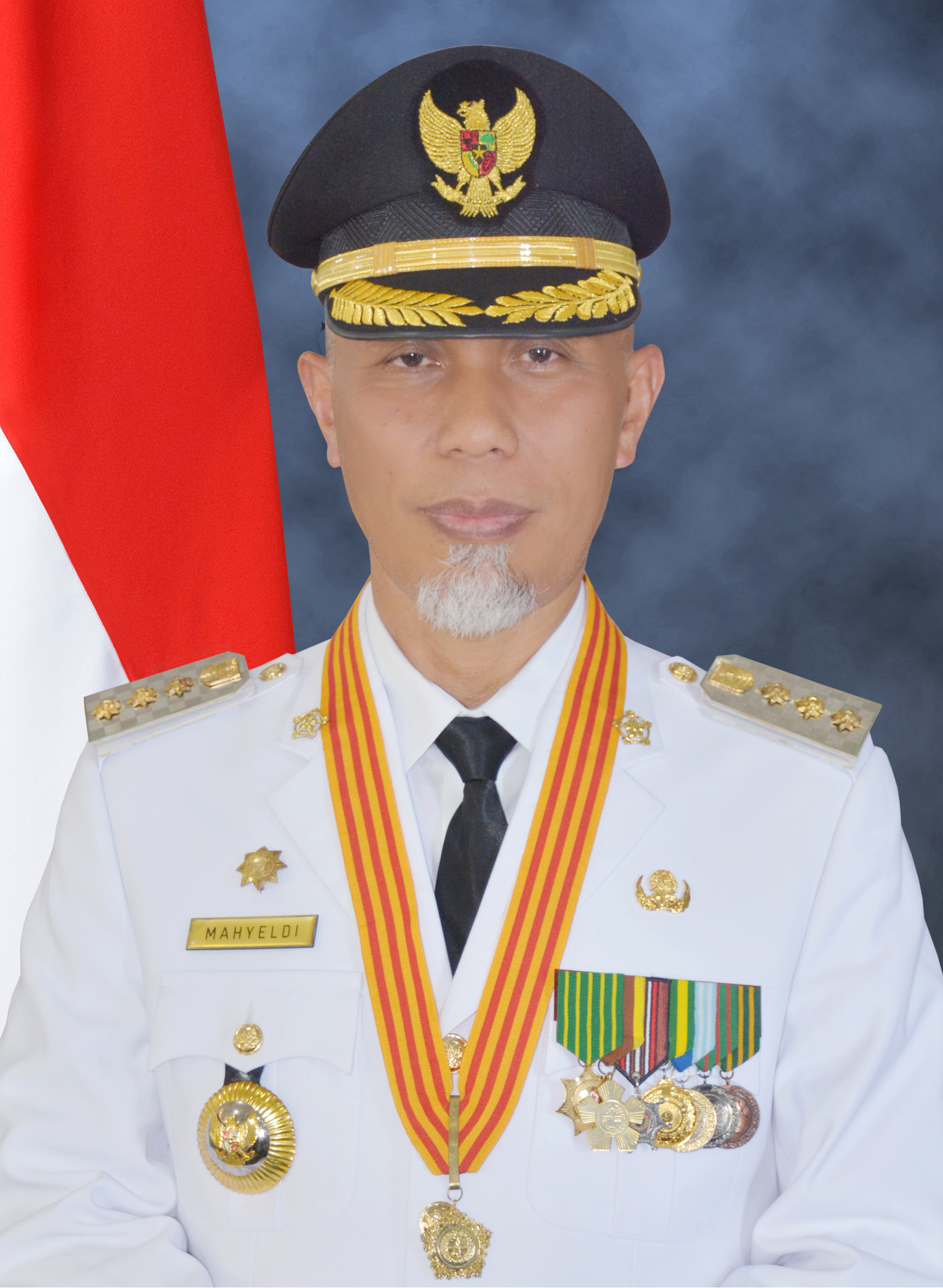

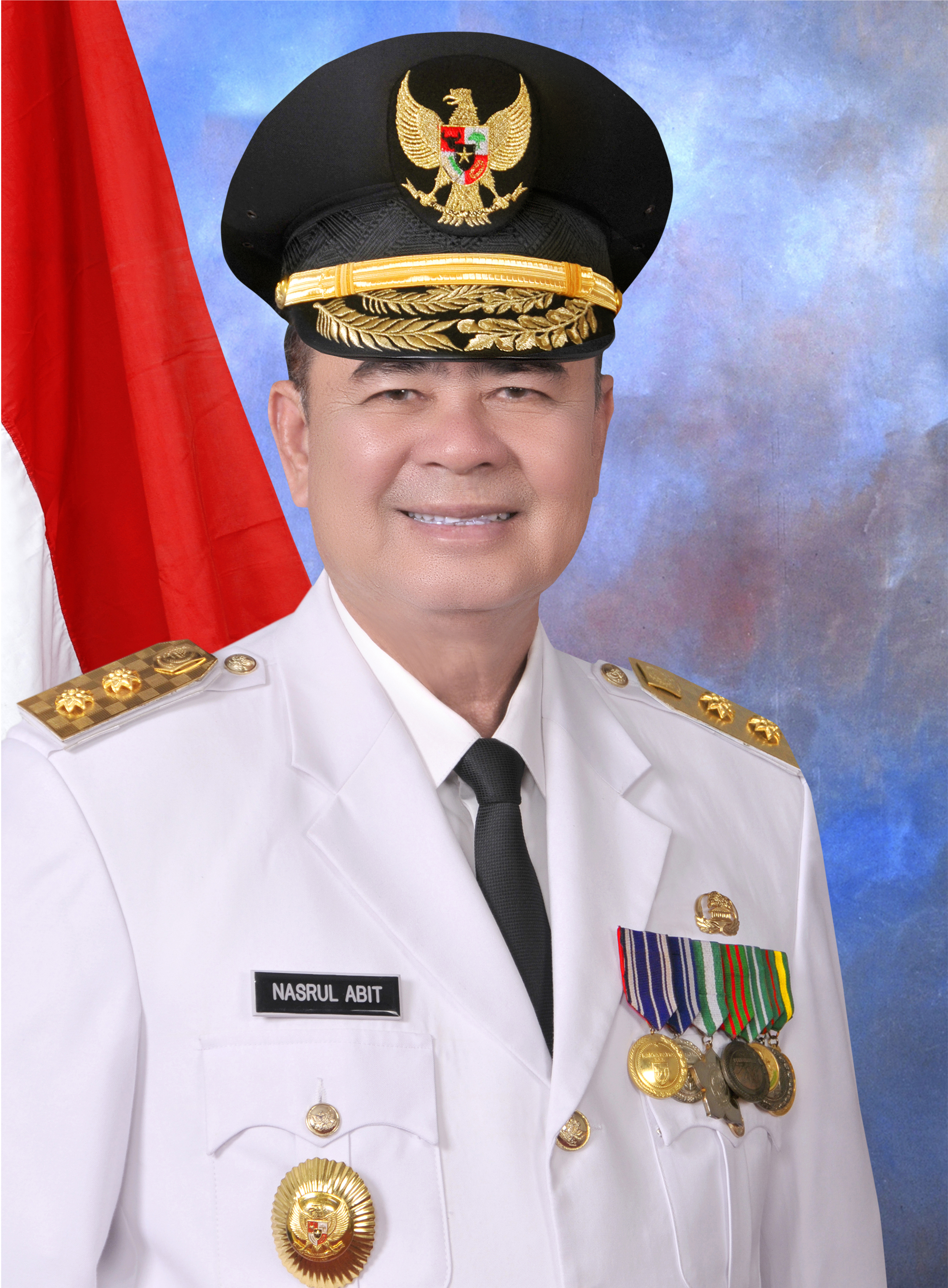

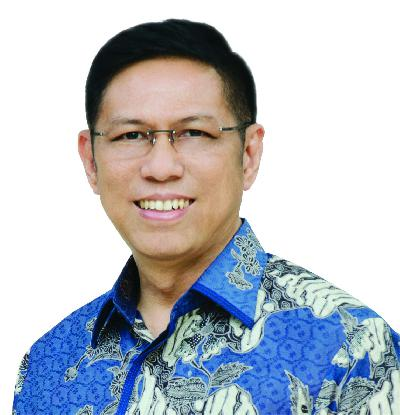

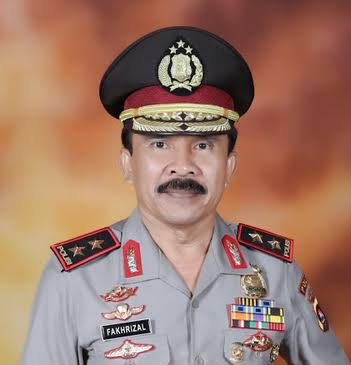

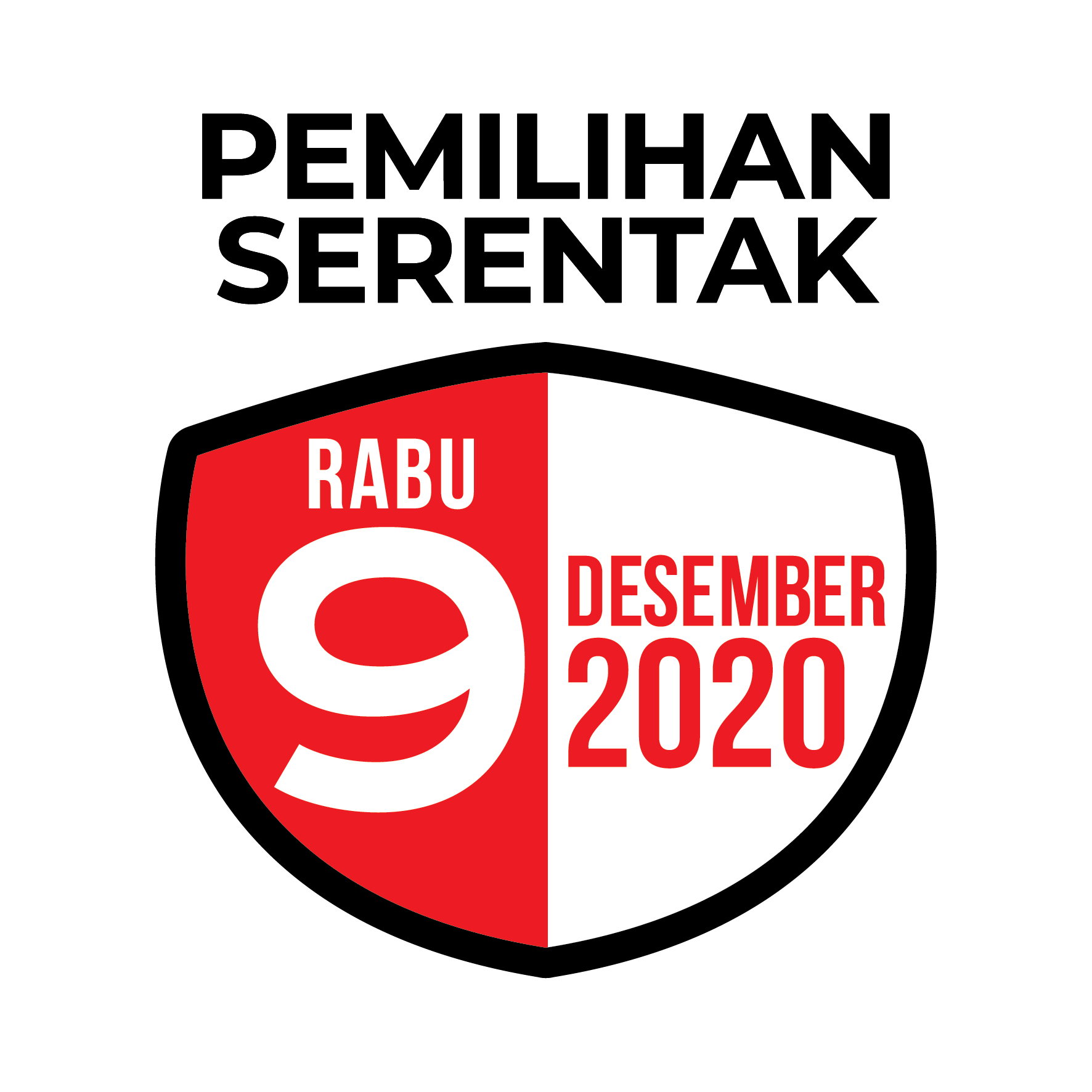

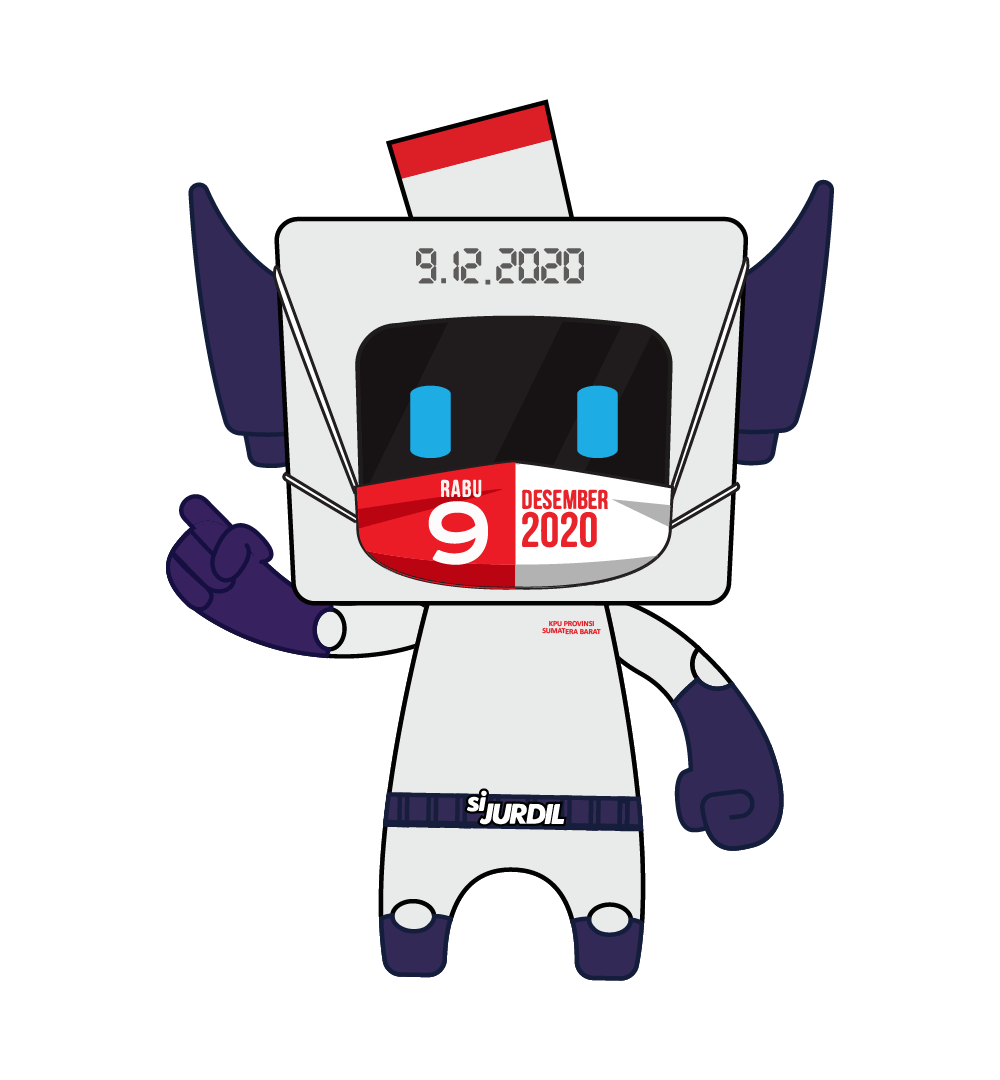
Nominee	Mahyeldi Ansharullah	Nasrul Abit
Party	PKS	Gerindra
Running mate	Audy Joinaldy	Indra Catri
Popular vote	726,853	679,069
Percentage	32.43%	30.3%
Nominee	Mulyadi	Fakhrizal
Party	Demokrat	Independent
Running mate	Ali Mukhni	Genius Umar
Popular vote	614,477	220,893
Percentage	27.42%	9.86%
Logo
Mascot
- Results by municipality

- Results by district
Governor before election
Irwan Prayitno
PKS
Elected Governor
Mahyeldi Ansharullah
PKS

The 2020 West Sumatra gubernatorial election was held on 9 December 2020 in West Sumatra, Indonesia, as part of the simultaneous local elections. This election was held by the West Sumatra Regional General Elections Commission (KPU), to elect the Governor of West Sumatra along with his deputy to a 2021–2024 mandate.

The incumbent Governor Irwan Prayitno was ineligible to run for a third term as he has already served two terms after winning the election in 2010 and being re-elected in 2015. The elected governor and deputy governor were inaugurated on 25 February 2021 by President Joko Widodo.

== Seats at the DPRD ==
There are 9 political parties that gained seats at the West Sumatra Regional House of Representatives (DPRD) in the 2019 legislative election.

Political party	Total		
Political party	Seats	%	▲ ▼ (2014)
Great Indonesia Movement Party	14 / 65	21.5%	▲6
Prosperous Justice Party	10 / 65	15.3%	▲3
Democratic Party	10 / 65	15.3%	▲2
National Mandate Party	10 / 65	15.3%	▲2
Golkar	8 / 65	12.3%	▼1
United Development Party	4 / 65	6.1%	▼4
NasDem Party	3 / 65	4.6%	▼3
Indonesian Democratic Party of Struggle	3 / 65	4.6%	▼1
National Awakening Party	3 / 65	4.6%	▲2

== Candidates ==
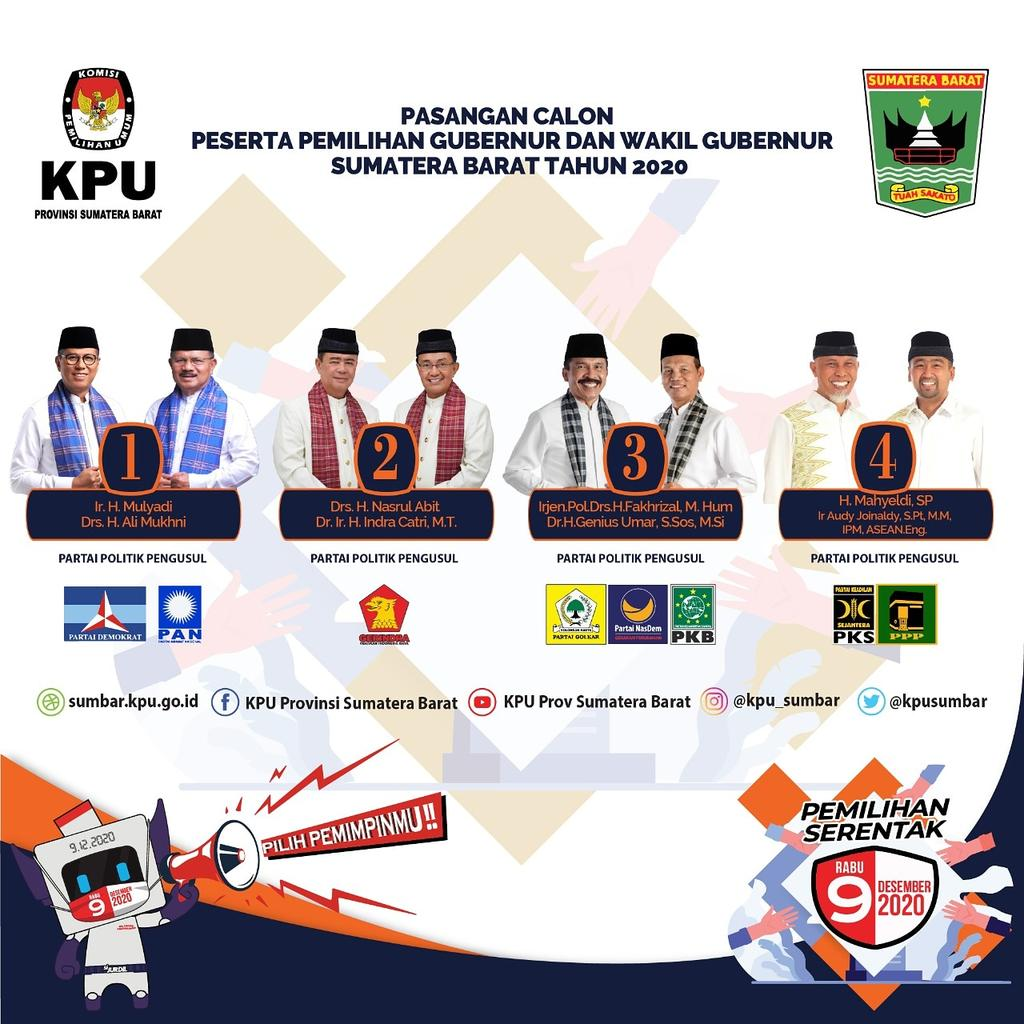
Announcement poster issued by the Regional West Sumatra KPU

Ballot number	Candidate for Governor and Deputy Governor		Nominator parties	Seats at the DPRD
1			Democratic Party; National Mandate Party	20 / 65
1	Mulyadi (Democratic Party)	Ali Mukhni (National Mandate Party)	Democratic Party; National Mandate Party	20 / 65
1	Member of DPR-RI (2009–2014, 2014–2019, 2019–2020)	Regent of Padang Pariaman (2010–2015, 2016–2021)	Democratic Party; National Mandate Party	20 / 65
2			Great Indonesia Movement Party	14 / 65
2	Nasrul Abit (Great Indonesia Movement Party)	Indra Catri (Great Indonesia Movement Party)	Great Indonesia Movement Party	14 / 65
2	Deputy Governor of West Sumatra (2016–2021); Regent of Pesisir Selatan (2005–2015)	Regent of Agam (2010–2015, 2016–2021)	Great Indonesia Movement Party	14 / 65
3			Golkar; NasDem Party; National Awakening Party; Supported by: Crescent Star Party; Berkarya Party; Indonesian Unity Party; Indonesian Justice and Unity Party; People's Conscience Party	14 / 65
3	Fakhrizal (Independent)	Genius Umar (Independent)	Golkar; NasDem Party; National Awakening Party; Supported by: Crescent Star Party; Berkarya Party; Indonesian Unity Party; Indonesian Justice and Unity Party; People's Conscience Party	14 / 65
3	Chief of West Sumatra Regional Police (2016–2019)	Mayor of Pariaman (2018–2023)	Golkar; NasDem Party; National Awakening Party; Supported by: Crescent Star Party; Berkarya Party; Indonesian Unity Party; Indonesian Justice and Unity Party; People's Conscience Party	14 / 65
4			Prosperous Justice Party; United Development Party	14 / 65
4	Mahyeldi Ansharullah (Prosperous Justice Party)	Audy Joinaldy (United Development Party)	Prosperous Justice Party; United Development Party	14 / 65
4	Mayor of Padang (2014–2019, 2019–2021); Deputy Mayor of Padang (2009–2014)	Businessperson	Prosperous Justice Party; United Development Party	14 / 65

== Debates ==
There were two gubernatorial debates, both of which were attended by the four candidates for governor and deputy governor.

Date	Theme	Moderator	Broadcaster
Monday, 23 November 2020	Economics, Maritime Affairs and Fisheries, Natural Resource Management, Environmental Affairs and Tourism	Imam Priyono	TVRI West Sumatra
Thursday, 3 December 2020	Governance, Public Services and Human Resource Development	Tysa Novenny	tvOne

== Controversy ==
On 2 September 2020, while submitting a letter of recommendation to the candidate pair of Mulyadi–Ali Mukhni from her party, in support of them, the Chairwoman of the Central Board of the Indonesian Democratic Party of Struggle (PDIP), Puan Maharani, made a remark that offended West Sumatra public at large, as she hopes that West Sumatra "could become a province that does support a Pancasila state". Another controversial statement was also made by the General Chairwoman of the PDIP, Megawati Sukarnoputri, who questioned West Sumatrans in general who disliked her party. Because of such controversial statements that deemed offending many West Sumatrans, Mulyadi–Ali Mukhni eventually returned the letter of recommendation from the party, leaving the PDIP not participating in this election.

On 5 December 2020, Mulyadi was named suspect by the Criminal Investigation Agency for allegedly violating campaigning rules. However, the case was stopped on 13 December 2020, and he was acquitted from all charges since.

== Opinion polls ==
Pollster	Date	Sample size	Result
Poltracking	19–23 October	1,200	Mulyadi (49.5%), Nasrul Abit (21.3%), Fakhrizal (6.2%), Mahyeldi (17.1%)
Poltracking	25–30 November	1,200	Mulyadi (37.2%), Nasrul Abit (27.5%), Fakhrizal (5.4%), Mahyeldi (25.2%)
Fixpoll	17–24 November	1,200	Mulyadi (24.1%), Nasrul Abit (29.5%), Fakhrizal (11.4%), Mahyeldi (22%)
SBLF	29 November – 3 December	2,000	Mulyadi (28.79%), Nasrul Abit (26.21%), Fakhrizal (6.62%), Mahyeldi (36.69%)

== Results ==
=== Summary ===
Summary of 9 December 2020 West Sumatra gubernatorial election result
Candidate	Running mate	Parties	Votes	%
Mahyeldi Ansharullah	Audy Joinaldy	Prosperous Justice Party	726,853	32.43
Nasrul Abit	Indra Catri	Great Indonesia Movement Party	679,069	30.3
Mulyadi	Ali Mukhni	Democratic Party	614,477	27.42
Fakhrizal	Genius Umar	Independent	220,893	9.86
Total			2,241,292	100.00
Valid votes			2,241,292	96.89
Invalid/blank votes			71,986	3.11
Turnout			2,313,278	62.19
Abstentions			1,406,151	37.81
Registered voters			3,719,429	
Source: West Sumatra Regional General Elections Commission

=== Details ===
Votes by municipality									Total votes
Votes by municipality	Mulyadi–Ali Mukhni Democratic Party		Nasrul Abit–Indra Catri Great Indonesia Movement Party		Fakhrizal–Genius Umar Independent		Mahyeldi Ansharullah–Audy Joinaldy Prosperous Justice Party		Total votes
Votes by municipality	Votes	%	Votes	%	Votes	%	Votes	%	Total votes
Agam Regency	56,199	30.24%	54,198	29.16%	14,978	8.06%	60,463	32.54%	185,838
Dharmasraya Regency	29,860	26.92%	32,135	28.97%	13,045	11.76%	35,879	32.35%	110,919
Lima Puluh Kota Regency	64,496	39.86%	37,044	22.89%	17,535	10.84%	42,729	26.41%	161,804
Mentawai Islands Regency	7,831	23.68%	16,745	50.64%	4,585	13.86%	3,909	11.82%	33,070
Padang Pariaman Regency	65,091	41.21%	33,214	21.03%	25,420	16.1%	34,212	21.66%	157,937
Pasaman Regency	45,891	36.85%	37,062	29.76%	7,045	5.66%	34,541	27.74%	124,539
Sijunjung Regency	32,114	29.45%	23,259	21.33%	17,863	16.38%	35,807	32.84%	109,043
Solok Regency	41,769	24.73%	45,004	26.64%	12,952	7.67%	69,195	40.96%	168,920
Pesisir Selatan Regency	33,483	14.88%	160,898	71.52%	8,904	3.96%	21,671	9.63%	224,956
South Solok Regency	21,914	24.26%	33,383	36.96%	7,137	7.9%	27,885	30.87%	90,319
Tanah Datar Regency	46,322	30.07%	32,178	20.89%	16,037	10.41%	59,501	38.63%	154,038
West Pasaman Regency	69,841	39.03%	41,961	23.45%	14,920	8.34%	52,203	29.18%	178,925
Bukittinggi City	22,742	40.99%	7,762	13.99%	2,855	5.15%	22,123	39.87%	55,482
Padang City	39,233	12.39%	82,802	26.16%	31,753	10.03%	152,741	48.25%	316,529
Padang Panjang City	3,481	16.37%	4,508	21.21%	1,996	9.39%	11,274	53.03%	21,259
Pariaman City	6,816	17.66%	5,982	15.5%	15,933	41.29%	9,856	25.54%	38,587
Payakumbuh City	12,892	27.19%	8,979	18.94%	3,543	7.47%	22,003	46.4%	47,417
Sawahlunto City	7,357	29.67%	4,588	18.5%	1,868	7.53%	10,887	43.9%	24,800
Solok City	7,145	19.36%	7,267	19.69%	2,524	6.84%	19,974	54.12%	36,910
Total	614,477	27.42%	679,069	30.3%	220,893	9.86%	726,853	32.43%	2,241,292
Total	2,241,292								
Source: West Sumatra Regional General Elections Commission

== See also ==
- 2020 Indonesian local elections
