= Zainal Bakar =

Indonesian politician (1940–2012)

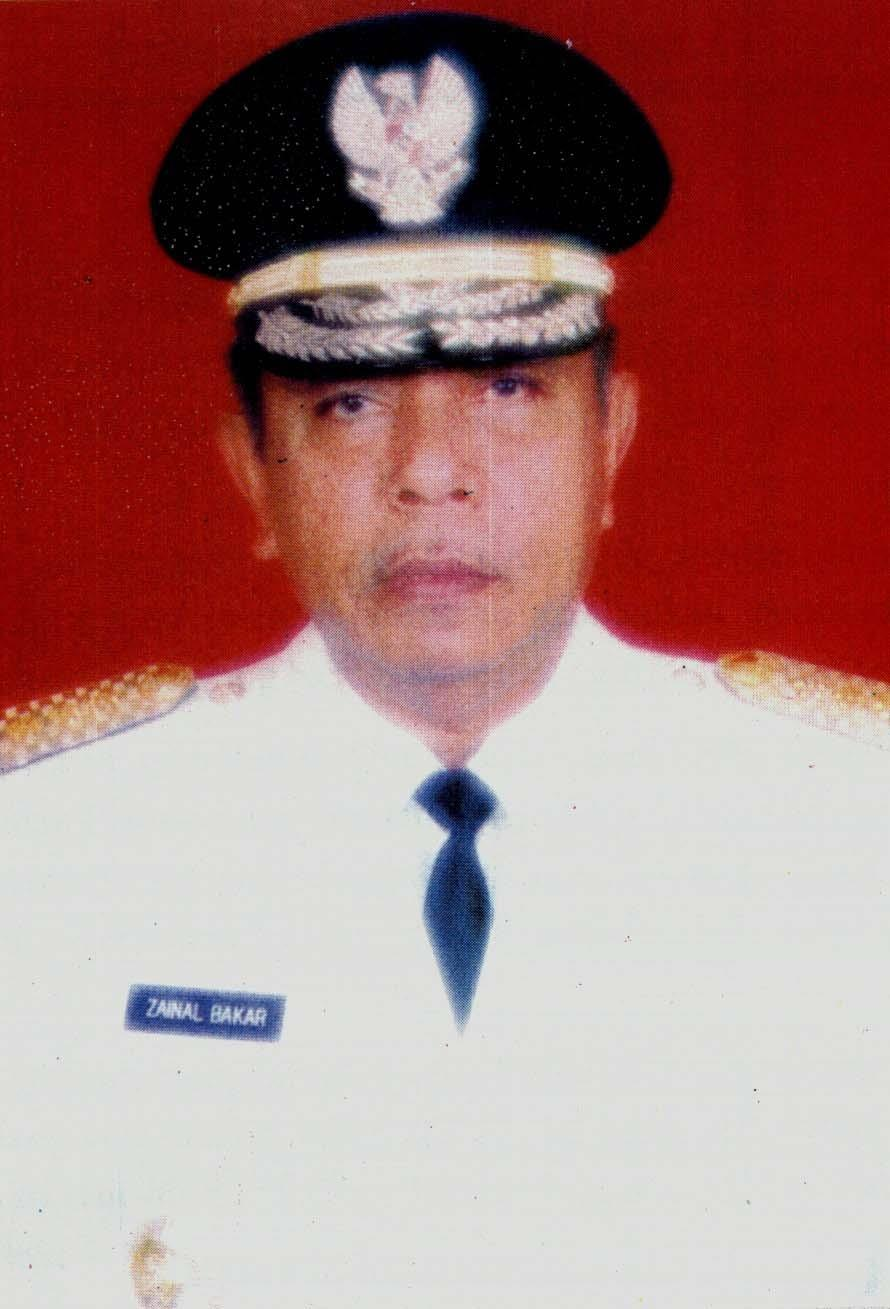

Governor of West Sumatra
- In office 24 February 2000 – 14 March 2005
- Preceded by: Muchlis Ibrahim
- Succeeded by: Gamawan Fauzi

Regent of Padang Pariaman
- In office 1990–1993

Personal details
- Born: 16 August 1940; Pariaman, Dutch East Indies
- Died: 31 July 2012 (aged 71); Padang, West Sumatra, Indonesia

Zainal Bakar (16 August 1940 – 31 July 2012) was an Indonesian politician and bureaucrat who served as the governor of West Sumatra between 2000 and 2005. Prior to becoming governor, he served as the regent of Padang Pariaman between 1990 and 1993, and had been part of the province's bureaucracy since 1967.

== Early life and education ==
Zainal was born on 16 August 1940 in Pariaman. He graduated from the faculty of law at Andalas University in 1967.

== Career ==
After graduating, Zainal began to work as a civil servant. In 1972, he was appointed as the acting regional secretary for Agam Regency, and he was officially appointed to that post in 1976. He later became head of human resources in the provincial government (1981), and then head of the economics office and the development office during the 1980s. In 1990, he was appointed as regent of Padang Pariaman Regency. During his term as regent, sitting West Sumatra governor Hasan Basri Durin appointed him as the provincial secretary in 1993.

In late 1998, the new West Sumatra governor Muchlis Ibrahim nominated the Head of the Regional Development Body, Nurmawan, to be his deputy. However, home affairs minister Syarwan Hamid instead appointed Zainal. With Zainal being assigned as his deputy, Ibrahim took offense and submitted his resignation on 13 March 1999. The following year, Zainal was sworn in as governor on 24 February. His tenure was supposed to expire on 24 February 2005, but it was extended until 14 March 2005. Zainal's tenure saw the construction of the Kelok 9 overpass and the Minangkabau International Airport.

In attempting to run for a second term, Zainal was defeated in the United Development Party's internal vote to select candidates, and due to administrative reasons an attempted endorsement by the National Mandate Party failed.

Zainal was designated as a suspect for corruption related to the province's 2002 budget in 2004. Investigation into Zainal was suspended in 2005, and the attorney general of West Sumatra revoked his status as a suspect in 2007 for health reasons.

== Personal life ==
Zainal was married to Zuarna Azziano and the couple had seven children. He died on 31 July 2012 at Dr M Djamil Central General Hospital in Padang. He had previously had strokes since 2006. He was buried on the same day at his family's grave in Padang Pariaman Regency, after briefly laying in state at the West Sumatra gubernatorial office.
