= Nasrul Abit =

Indonesian politician (1954–2021)

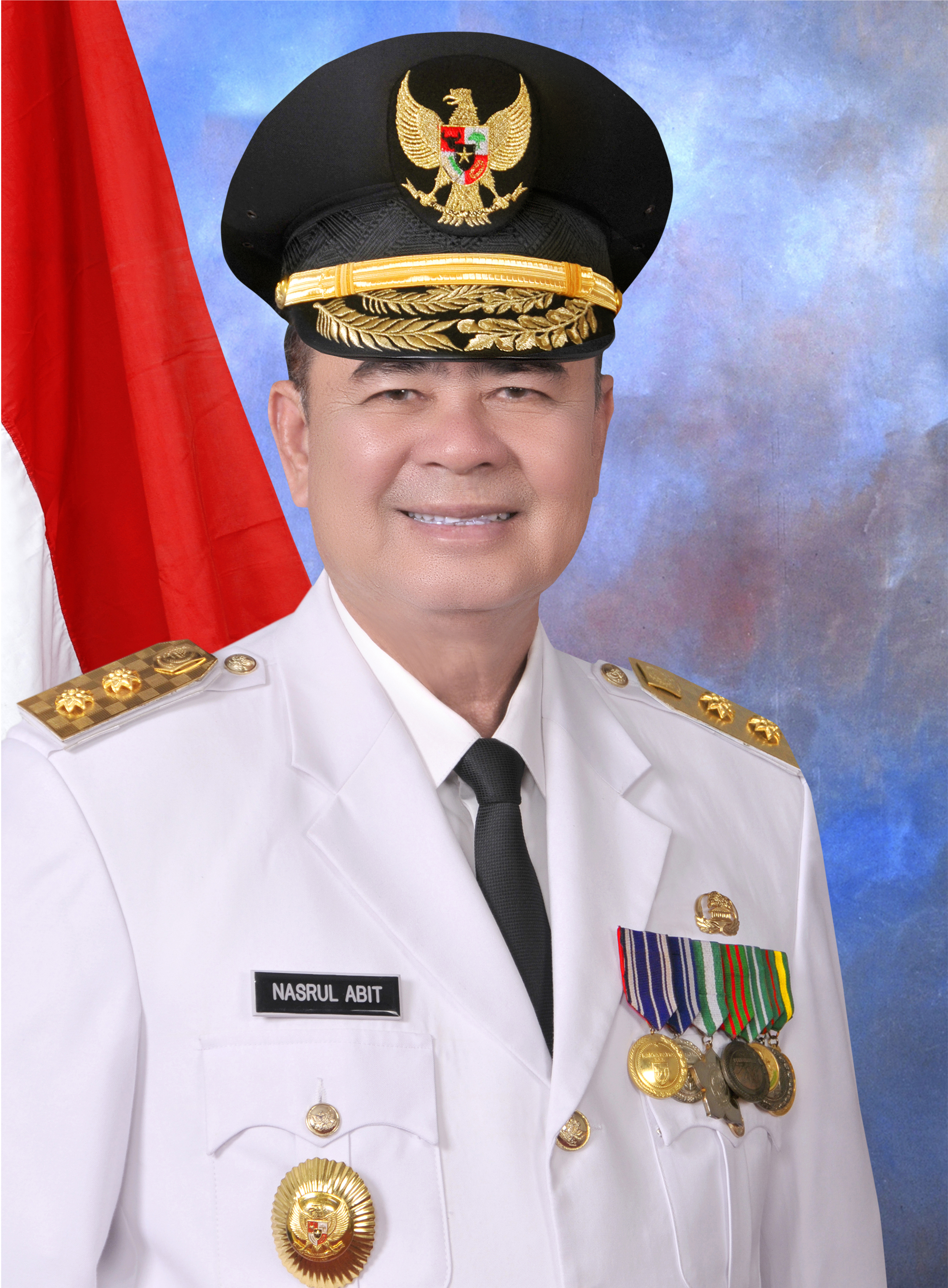

8th Vice Governor of West Sumatra
- In office 12 February 2016 – 12 February 2021
- Governor: Irwan Prayitno
- Preceded by: Muslim Kasim
- Succeeded by: Audy Joinaldy

Regent of Pesisir Selatan
- In office 17 September 2005 – 17 September 2015
- Preceded by: Darizal Basir
- Succeeded by: Alwis

Deputy Regent of Pesisir Selatan
- In office 17 September 2000 – 17 September 2005
- Preceded by: Position created
- Succeeded by: Syafrizal Ucok

Personal details
- Born: 24 December 1954 Air Haji, Linggo Sari Baganti District (present-day Pesisir Selatan Regency, Indonesia)
- Died: 28 August 2021 (aged 66) Padang, Indonesia
- Spouse: Wartawati
- Children: 3

Nasrul Abit (24 December 1954 – 28 August 2021) was an Indonesian politician and member of the Great Indonesia Movement Party.

He served as the 8th Vice Governor of West Sumatra from 12 February 2016, until 12 February 2021, under Governor Irwan Prayitno, having been elected as Prayitno's running mate in the 2015 West Sumatra gubernatorial election. Prior to this, Abit served as the Regent of Pesisir Selatan Regency from September 2005 to September 2015, as well as the inaugural Deputy Regent of Pesisir Selatan Regency from 2000 to 2005 under then-Regent Darizal Basir.

== Biography ==
Abit was born on 24 December 1954, in the village of Air Haji in present-day Pesisir Selatan Regency, West Sumatra.

In 2020, Nasrul Abit ran for Governor of West Sumatra in the gubernatorial election, with Indra Catri as his running mate for vice governor. However, Abit was narrowly defeated in the election by Mahyeldi Ansharullah and his running mate, Audy Joinaldy. The Mahyeldi-Audy gubernatorial ticket won the election with 361,406 votes, or 33.7 percent of the vote, while Nasrul Abit and Indra Catri placed second with 324,215 votes, or 30.2 percent.

Nasrul Abit contracted COVID-19 in August 2021. He died from the coronavirus at Central General Hospital (RSUP) in Padang on 28 August 2021, just one week after his diagnosis.
