= List of governors of West Sumatra =

Governor of Sumatra Barat
- Gubernur Sumatera Barat
- Coat of arms of West Sumatra

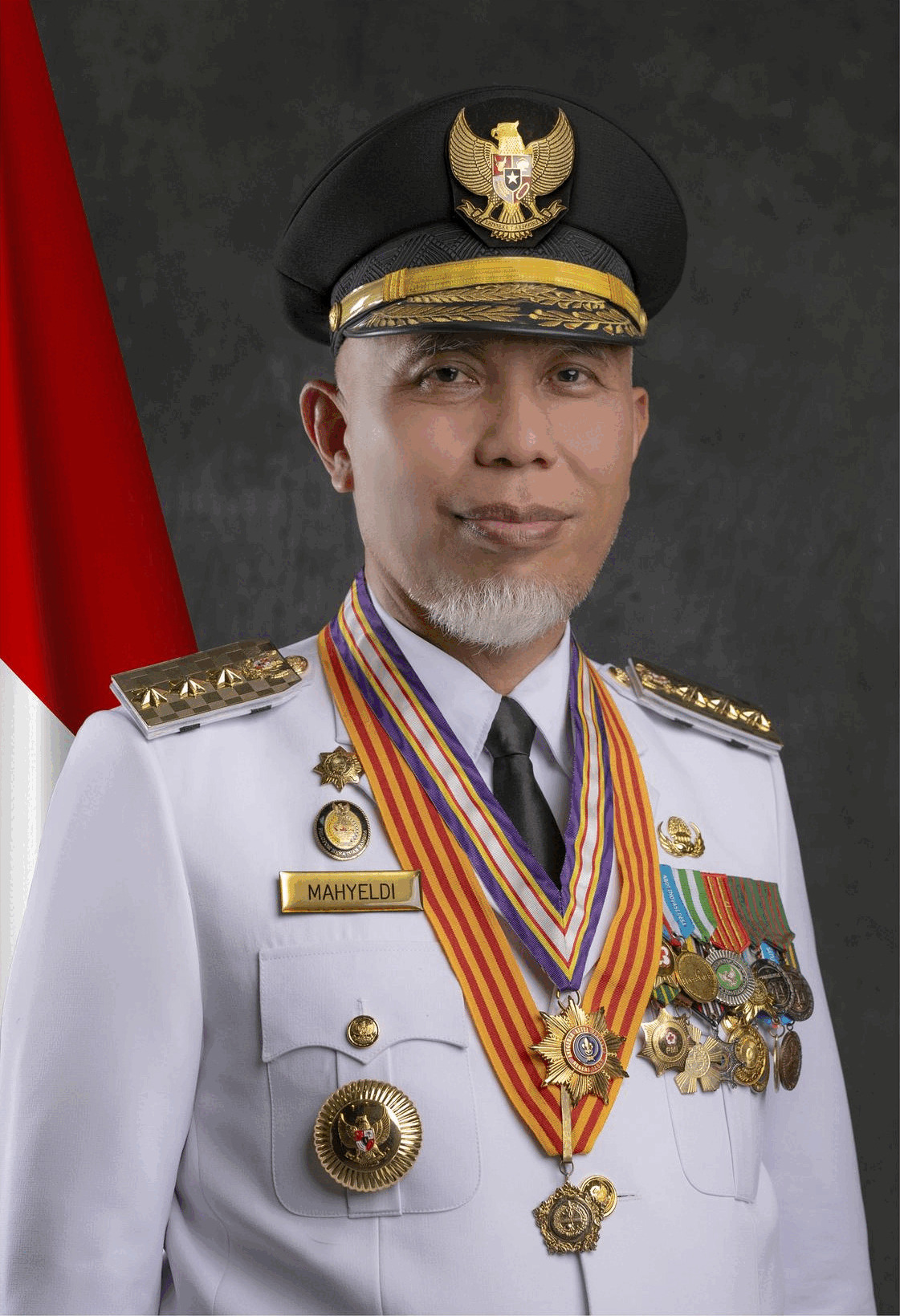
- Incumbent; Mahyeldi Ansharullah since 25 February 2021
- West Sumatra Provincial Government
- Style: Mr. Governor (informal); His Excellency (diplomatic)
- Type: Chief executive
- Status: Head of government
- Abbreviation: GOWS (in English); Gub. Sumbar (in Indonesian)
- Residence: Gubernuran Sumatera Barat, Sudirman Street, Padang
- Nominator: Political parties
- Appointer: Direct popular elections within West Sumatra or President members of the West Sumatra Regional House of Representatives (formerly)
- Term length: Five years, renewable once 1 years (specifically for the acting governor)
- Formation: 1 October 1945 (as resident)
- First holder: Muhammad Sjafei
- Deputy: Vice Governor of West Sumatra
- Salary: Rp3 million (US$179,47) per month
- Website: sumbarprov.go.id

The following is a list of the governors of West Sumatra who have served since October 1, 1945 until now.

The governor of West Sumatra, one of the provinces of Indonesia, is the chief executive of the province. The office was created in 1958, thirteen years after Indonesian independence in 1945.

== List of governors ==
=== West Coast Province of Sumatra (1942–1945) ===
#	Portrait	Name	Took office	Left office	Notes
(acting)		Fujiyama	17 March 1942	1 August 1942	(Note: Colonel Fujiyama as acting temporary Shūchōkan as a way to set up a temporary administration prior to the arrival of bureaucrats from Japan in occupied West Sumatra)
1		Yano Kenzo	1 August 1942	31 March 1944	(Note: First governor of West Sumatra by technicality, as he was bestowed by independence leaders and first to be titled 'Governor' by the reigning government also, instead of a residency followed by the Dutch prior. Unlike other Japanese militarists, he was highly Pro-Independence and actively helped foster the independence movement in West Sumatra during the Japanese occupation. He resigned in protest against the cruelty of the Japanese occupying government.)
2		Hattori Naoaki	6 April 1944	12 May 1945	

=== West Sumatra Residency (1945–1948) ===
#	Portrait	Name	Took office	Left office	Notes
1		Muhammad Sjafei	1 October 1945	15 November 1945	(Note: Resign)
2	al=	Roesad Datuk Perpatih Baringek	15 November 1945	14 March 1946	(Note: Resign)
3	al=	Mohammad Djamil	18 March 1946	1 July 1946	
4		Sutan Mohammad Rasjid	20 July 1946	29 April 1947	
5		Mohammad Nasroen	29 April 1947	15 April 1948	(Note: Residency is abolished based on Law 10 of 1948)

=== Central Sumatra Province (1948–1956) ===
#	Portrait	Name	Took office	Left office	Notes
1		Mohammad Nasroen	15 April 1948	19 December 1948	(Note: Central Sumatra was frozen as a result of Operation Kraai from 19 December 1948 to 1 January 1950.)
(acting)		Sutan Mohammad Rasjid	2 January 1949	May 1949	
(acting)		Sutan Mohammad Rasjid	May 1949	October 1949	
1		Mohammad Nasroen	October 1949	1 August 1950	(Note: There was a vacuum after-Tan Tuah Motion which led to the removal of Governor Nasroen from Central Sumatra. In the meantime, the leader of the Central Sumatra province is held by the Central Sumatra Governing Council.)
(acting)		Ruslan Muljohardjo	9 November 1950	1 May 1951	(Note: Ahmad Husein took over from Roeslan on December 20, 1956, followed by the declaration of Revolutionary Government of the Republic of Indonesia on February 15, 1958)
2		Ruslan Muljohardjo	1 May 1951	20 December 1956	(Note: Ahmad Husein took over from Roeslan on December 20, 1956, followed by the declaration of Revolutionary Government of the Republic of Indonesia on February 15, 1958)

=== West Sumatra Province (1958–present) ===
#	Portrait	Name	Took office	Left office	Notes
1		Kaharuddin Datuk Rangkayo Basa	17 May 1958	5 July 1965	(Note: Be dismissed)
(acting)		Suputro Brotodihardjo	5 July 1965	4 June 1966	(Note: Acting Governor)
2		Harun Al Rasyid Zain	4 June 1966	4 June 1971	(Note: Inaugurated as governor despite losing the election for Governor of West Sumatra on March 17, 1966)
(acting)		Harun Al Rasyid Zain	4 June 1971	3 April 1972	(Note: Because in an atmosphere of general elections, his term of office is extended as Acting Governor who will carry out his duties until the appointment of a definitive governor.)
2		Harun Al Rasyid Zain	3 April 1972	3 April 1977	
(acting)		Harun Al Rasyid Zain	3 April 1977	18 October 1977	
3		Azwar Anas	18 October 1977	18 October 1982	
(acting)		Azwar Anas	18 October 1982	30 October 1982	
3		Azwar Anas	30 October 1982	30 October 1987	
4		Hasan Basri Durin	30 October 1987	30 October 1992	
(acting)		Hasan Basri Durin	30 October 1992	29 December 1992	
4		Hasan Basri Durin	29 December 1992	29 December 1997	
5		Muchlis Ibrahim	29 December 1997	27 March 1999	(Note: Resign)
(acting)		Dunidja D.	27 March 1999	24 February 2000	
6		Zainal Bakar	24 February 2000	24 February 2005	
(acting)		Zainal Bakar	24 February 2005	14 March 2005	(Note: Extension term)
(acting)		Muhammad Thamrin	14 March 2005	15 August 2005	
7		Gamawan Fauzi	15 August 2005	22 October 2009	(Note: Quit after being appointed as Minister of Home Affairs of the Republic of Indonesia)
(acting)		Marlis Rahman	22 October 2009	7 December 2009	
8		Marlis Rahman	7 December 2009	15 August 2010	
9		Irwan Prayitno	15 August 2010	15 August 2015	
(acting)		Reydonnyzar Moenek	15 August 2015	12 February 2016	
9 (2015)		Irwan Prayitno	12 February 2016	12 February 2021	
(daily caretaker)		Alwis	12 February 2021	18 February 2021	
(acting)		Hamdani	18 February 2021	25 February 2021	
10 (2020) (2024)		Mahyeldi Ansharullah	25 February 2021	Incumbent	

Military officer
Non-partisan/government assignment
Prosperous Justice Party (PKS)
Prosperous Justice Party 2020 (PKS 2020)
