= Marlis Rahman =

Indonesian politician and academic (1942–2018)

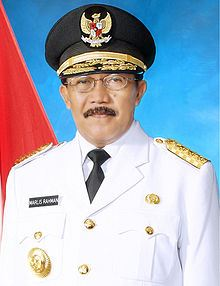

Governor of West Sumatra
- In office 7 December 2009 – 15 August 2010; Acting between 23 October and 7 December 2009
- Preceded by: Gamawan Fauzi
- Succeeded by: Irwan Prayitno

Vice Governor of West Sumatra
- In office 15 August 2005 – 23 October 2009

Personal details
- Born: 9 June 1942 Bukittinggi, Japanese-occupied Dutch East Indies
- Died: 28 July 2018 (aged 76) Padang, Indonesia

Marlis Rahman (9 June 1942 – 28 July 2018) was an Indonesian politician and academic. He served as Governor of West Sumatra for eight months between 2009 and 2010, and before that as the province's vice governor between 2005 and 2009. He was previously the rector of Andalas University.

== Early life and academic career ==
Rahman was born on 9 June 1942 in Bukittinggi, as the youngest of five children. His father was Malin Batuah, a cart driver, and his mother Lian was a housewife. He completed his elementary, middle and high school educations in state schools in Bukittinggi, before continuing his studies to Andalas University. While in Andalas, he was active in the student body, and later the organizations KAMI and the Muslim Students' Association. He was later sent to the Bandung Institute of Technology to complete his degree, and he obtained his bachelor's in Biology in 1970. He then worked in the biology department within Andalas, becoming the department secretary in the mid-1970s. In 1977, he became the school director at the Semen Padang High School.

In 1978, Rahman became the dean of Andalas' faculty of natural sciences, and remained so until 1983. He later continued his studies at Ohio University, receiving his master's in botany and later a PhD in 1989. Returning to Andalas, he continued to serve as faculty head between 1990 and 1994. In 1997, he became the university's rector.

== Political career ==
Rahman ran as the running mate to Gamawan Fauzi in West Sumatra's 2005 gubernatorial election, with the pair winning 41.54 percent of votes in a five candidate race. They were sworn in on 15 August 2005.

On 23 October 2009, Fauzi resigned as governor due to his appointment as home affairs minister, and Rahman became the province's acting governor. He was officially sworn in as governor by Fauzi on 7 December 2009, the ceremony taking place at the provincial council building's parking garage as its main room was still damaged from the September earthquake.

He ran as a gubernatorial candidate in the 2010 gubernatorial election, but placed second in the five-candidate race with Irwan Prayitno instead becoming governor.

== Later life and death ==
Rahman died on 28 July 2018 at his home in Padang. Although he was provided with a state funeral and his body was to be brought to the governors' office, this was cancelled due to his family's request. He was buried at a nearby cemetery in Padang.
