= Gamawan Fauzi =

Indonesian politician (born 1957)

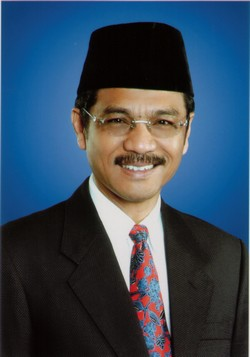
- Official portrait, 2009

27th Minister of Home Affairs
- In office 22 October 2009 – 20 October 2014
- President: Susilo Bambang Yudhoyono
- Preceded by: Mardiyanto
- Succeeded by: Tjahjo Kumolo

8th Governor of West Sumatra
- In office 15 August 2005 – 22 October 2009
- Deputy: Marlis Rahman
- Preceded by: Zainal Bakar
- Succeeded by: Marlis Rahman

Personal details
- Born: 9 November 1957 (age 68) Solok, West Sumatra, Indonesia
- Party: Independent
- Spouse: Vita Gamawan Fauzi
- Children: Idola Prima Gita; Gina Dwi Fachria; Gian Gufran
- Education: Andalas University; State University of Padang

Gamawan Fauzi (born 9 November 1957) is an Indonesian politician. He served as Minister of Home Affairs between 2009 and 2014, and as Governor of West Sumatra between 2005 and 2009.

== Career ==
Fauzi was the Minister of Home Affairs in the Second United Indonesia Cabinet and head of the Department of Home Affairs in the Second United Indonesia Cabinet. He was the first non military individual that held the position since PNI cadre, Sanusi, in the late 1950s. He holds a bachelor's degree from the Andalas University School of Law in Padang. He won the Bung Hatta Award for his efforts to battle corruption. Despite having been supported by the Indonesian Democratic Party – Struggle in his successful election campaign for the governorship of West Sumatra, he supported Susilo Bambang Yudhoyono of the rival Democrat Party in the 2009 Indonesian presidential election. He achieved the ideals ambitions commonly held by a civil service by having experiences to designated as a Regent, a Governor and finally a Minister of Home Affairs . “I am among the lucky officer. During the past 10 years, I experienced the era of five presidents since Suharto era until Yudhoyono."

Political offices
Preceded by Mardiyanto	Minister of Home Affairs; 2009–2014	Succeeded by Tjahjo Kumolo
Preceded by Zainal Bakar; Thamrin (acting)	Governor of West Sumatra; 2005–2009	Succeeded by Marlis Rahman
