= Muchlis Ibrahim =

Indonesian politician and soldier

Governor of West Sumatra
- In office 29 December 1997 – 15 March 1999
- Preceded by: Hasan Basri Durin
- Succeeded by: Zainal Bakar

Personal details
- Born: 13 October 1942 (age 82); Agam, Japan-occupied Dutch East Indies

Military service
- Allegiance: Indonesia
- Branch/service: Indonesian Army
- Rank: Major general (honorary)

Muchlis Ibrahim (born 13 October 1942) is an Indonesian politician and former military officer who served as the governor of West Sumatra between 1997 and 1999 and previously as the province's vice governor between 1993 and 1997. He resigned as governor in 1999 due to disagreements with the central government over the appointment of his deputy.

== Early life and education ==
Ibrahim was born in the village of Tanjung Medan within what is today Agam Regency on 13 October 1942. He completed elementary school in his home village and then continued to middle school, briefly being interrupted by the Revolutionary Government of the Republic of Indonesia's revolt. He then completed high school in Bukittinggi. Moving to Java, he was accepted at both the veterinary department of the University of Indonesia and the Indonesian Military Academy, and he enrolled in the latter.

== Career ==
After graduating from the academy, he joined the air defense artillery unit, first stationed in Malang and then in Palembang. He was reassigned to Jakarta in 1969, and briefly received training as an artillery officer in Australia the following year. He was then appointed head of the army's data gathering and processing unit, and enrolled at SESKOAD in 1978. He was then posted to Pekanbaru as a battalion commander, and promoted to lieutenant colonel. He continued to rise up the army's ranks, with a brief stint as head of the artillery department at the Indonesian Military Academy, until he became the inspector of Kodam I/Bukit Barisan in 1991.

In 1993, sitting governor of West Sumatra Hasan Basri Durin appointed Ibrahim to be his deputy to replace the retiring Sjoerkani. Ibrahim was sworn in in October 1993, and along with this appointment he was promoted to brigadier general in early 1994. He was later elected by the provincial legislature to replace Hasan, and was sworn in as governor on 29 December 1997. He was given a post-retirement honorary promotion to major general on 16 February 1998.

Ibrahim's tenure coincided with the 1997 Asian financial crisis and the fall of Suharto, with frequent student protests during his term. Due to this, the post of vice governor under him remained vacant for some time. Only in late 1998 did Ibrahim nominate the Head of the Regional Development Body, Nurmawan, to be his deputy. However, Zainal Bakar, previously provincial secretary, was instead appointed by home affairs minister Syarwan Hamid. Ibrahim felt slighted by this, and thus he submitted his resignation on 13 March 1999, taking effect two days later. Bakar was sworn in as governor in his place in 2000.

During the early 2000s, the newly formed Democratic Party offered Ibrahim a position as the party's provincial chairman in West Sumatra. However, by that time Ibrahim had moved to Jakarta, and thus rejected the offer.

== Personal life ==
He is married to Widianingsih, whom he met in Palembang, and the couple has three children.
