= Datuak =

Datuak is a traditional, honorary title bestowed on a person by the agreement of a people or tribe in the Minangkabau language, spoken by the Minangkabau people of Indonesia and Malaysia. The title of Datuk was agreed upon by local, traditional leaders (Kerapatan Adat Nagari, abbreviated "KAN"). The title engenders great respect, and is only used for Minangkabau men who have become stakeholders of traditional leaders or pangulu (noblemen) for a particular tribe. When the title is bestowed, it is celebrated with a traditional ceremony (Malewa Gala) and a banquet.

== Inheritance ==
Unlike other Malay traditions, the title of datuak is inherited according to the matrilineal system. When a datuak dies his title may pass to his brother or nephew, whoever is closest in the maternal line. If there is no maternal relative, it may be given to another tribal member with the agreement of the tribe.

If the tribe has expanded and split up into groups in other areas, it may appoint a new datuak by appending one or two words to the previous datuak title; for example, if a datuak name is Datuak Bandaro it may be expanded to Bandaro Putiah or Datuak Bandaro nan Putiah with the agreement of each tribal subgroup.

== Tradition ==
The social status of a people in Minangkabau society may be seen from its datuak title. The beginning of the oldest titles usually consists of one syllable and is derived from Sanskrit (for example, Datuak Katamanggungan). Other datuak titles are composed of two (or more) words (for example, Datuak Parpatiah nan Sabatang). After the Islamic influence, the title of datuak is derived from Arabic. Below is a list of major datuak titles in Minangkabau legend and tradition:

- Datuak Ketumanggungan
- Datuak Parpatiah nan Sabatang
- Datuak Bandaro
- Datuak Makhudum
- Datuak Indomo
- Datuak Sinaro

== See also ==
- Barangay
- Datu
- Greater India
- Hinduism in the Philippines
- History of the Philippines (Before 1521)
- Indian honorifics – Indonesian and Malay titles originated from these
- Indosphere
- Maginoo
- Malay nobility
- Malay styles and titles
- Principalía
- Ratu
