= 2015 West Sumatra gubernatorial election =

Local election in Indonesia

- 9 December 2015
- Turnout: 58.56%
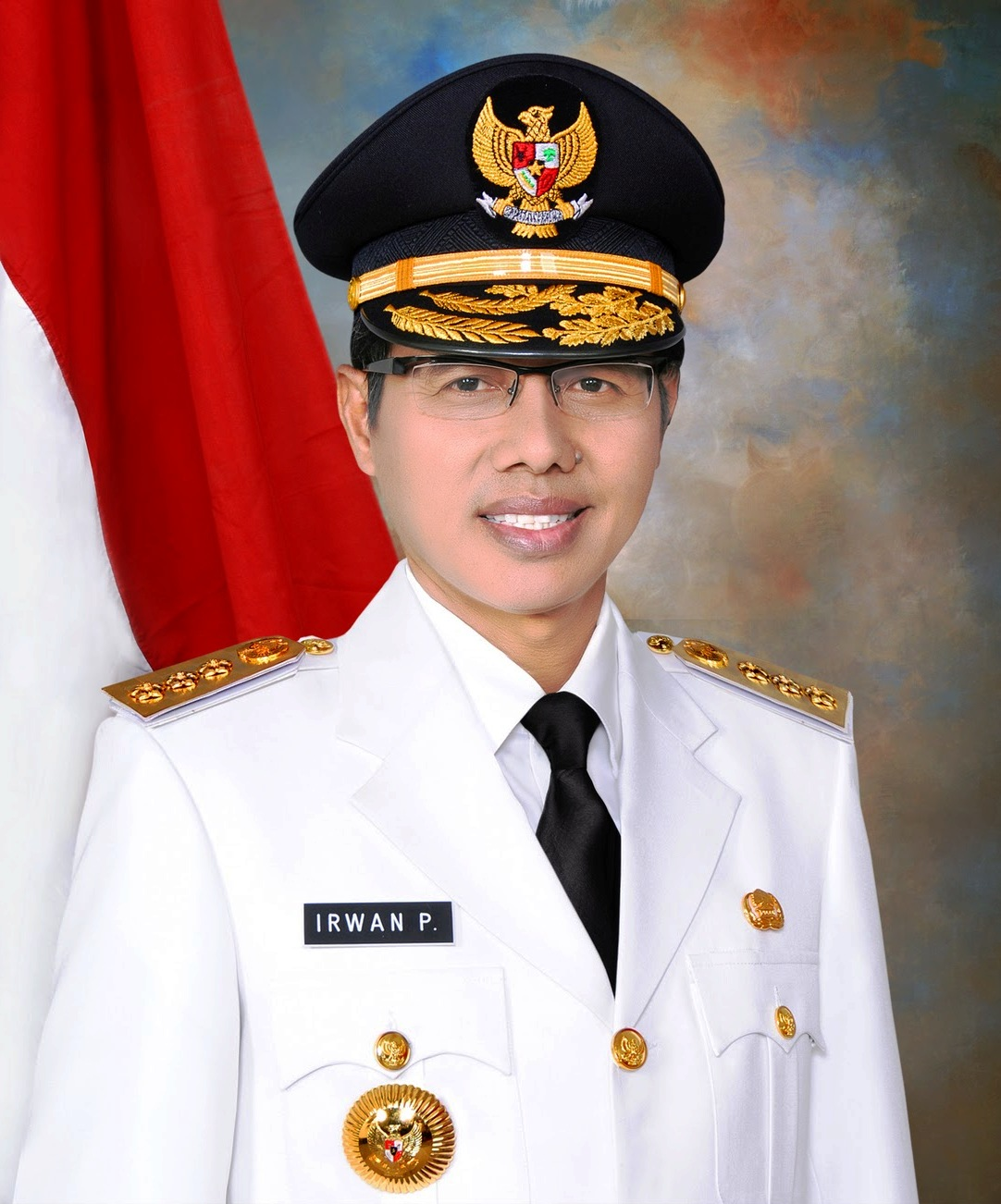

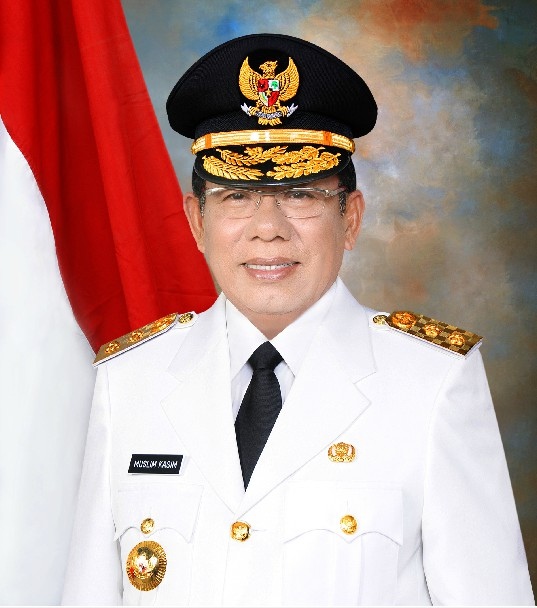
Nominee	Irwan Prayitno	Muslim Kasim
Party	PKS	Golkar
Running mate	Nasrul Abit	Fauzi Bahar
Popular vote	1,175,858	830,131
Percentage	58.62%	41.38%
- Results by municipality
Governor before election
Reydonnyzar Moenek
(interim)
Elected Governor
Irwan Prayitno
PKS

The 2015 West Sumatra gubernatorial election was held on 9 December 2015 in West Sumatra, Indonesia, as part of the simultaneous local elections. This election was held by the West Sumatra Regional General Elections Commission (KPU), to elect the Governor of West Sumatra along with their deputy to a 2016–2021 mandate.

The incumbent Governor Irwan Prayitno was eligible to run for a second term, and he was subsequently renominated for governor by the Prosperous Justice Party, in a coalition with the Great Indonesia Movement Party, who nominated Nasrul Abit for deputy governor.

== Candidates ==
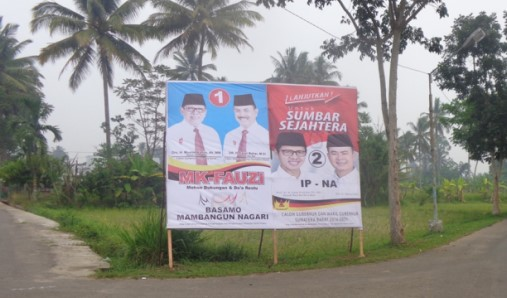
Campaign banners of both candidate pairs in Payakumbuh City, late November 2015

This election was participated by two candidate pairs for governor and deputy governor.

Ballot number	Candidate for Governor and Deputy Governor		Nominator parties
1			National Mandate Party; Indonesian Democratic Party of Struggle; NasDem Party; People's Conscience Party; Supported by: Golkar; United Development Party; Democratic Party; National Awakening Party; Crescent Star Party; Indonesian Justice and Unity Party
1	Muslim Kasim (Golkar)	Fauzi Bahar (National Mandate Party)	National Mandate Party; Indonesian Democratic Party of Struggle; NasDem Party; People's Conscience Party; Supported by: Golkar; United Development Party; Democratic Party; National Awakening Party; Crescent Star Party; Indonesian Justice and Unity Party
1	Deputy Governor of West Sumatra (2010–2015); Regent of Padang Pariaman (2000–2010)	Mayor of Padang (2004–2014)	National Mandate Party; Indonesian Democratic Party of Struggle; NasDem Party; People's Conscience Party; Supported by: Golkar; United Development Party; Democratic Party; National Awakening Party; Crescent Star Party; Indonesian Justice and Unity Party
2			Prosperous Justice Party; Great Indonesia Movement Party
2	Irwan Prayitno (Prosperous Justice Party)	Nasrul Abit (Great Indonesia Movement Party)	Prosperous Justice Party; Great Indonesia Movement Party
2	Governor of West Sumatra (2010–2015)	Regent of Pesisir Selatan (2005–2015)	Prosperous Justice Party; Great Indonesia Movement Party

== Result ==
Candidate	Votes	%
Muslim Kasim	830,131	41.38%
Irwan Prayitno	1,175,858	58.62%
Invalid votes/abstentions	1,466,013	
Total Valid Votes	2,055,989	100%
Registered voters	3,522,002	
Source: West Sumatra Government General Elections Commission
