= State University of Padang =

Public university in West Sumatra, Indonesia

- Universitas Negeri Padang
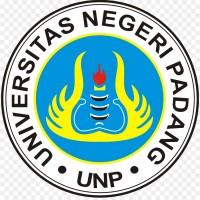
- UNP Emblem
- Former names: IKIP Padang (Padang Teachers Training and Education Institute)
- Motto: Alam Takambang Jadi Guru (Learn from Nature)
- Type: State
- Established: October 23, 1954
- Rector: Prof. H. Ganefri, Ph.D., M.Pd.
- Academic staff: 950 staffs
- Students: 30,000 students
- Undergraduates: 70 undergraduate programs
- Doctoral students: 1 program
- Location: Padang, West Sumatra, Indonesia
- Colors: Yellow
- Website: www.unp.ac.id

The State University of Padang (Indonesian: Universitas Negeri Padang, abbreviated UNP) is a state university in Padang, West Sumatra, Indonesia, On the 23rd of October 1954, it was established by the Ministry of Education Indonesia. Currently, the rector is Krismadinata, S.T., M.T., Ph.D. Previously, the rector was Prof. Ganefri, Ph.D. Based on SK BANPT 151/SK/BAN-PT/AK-ISK/PT/IV/2022, the State University of Padang obtained "Excellent" grade accreditation.

It is included as one of the '50 promising universities in Indonesia'.

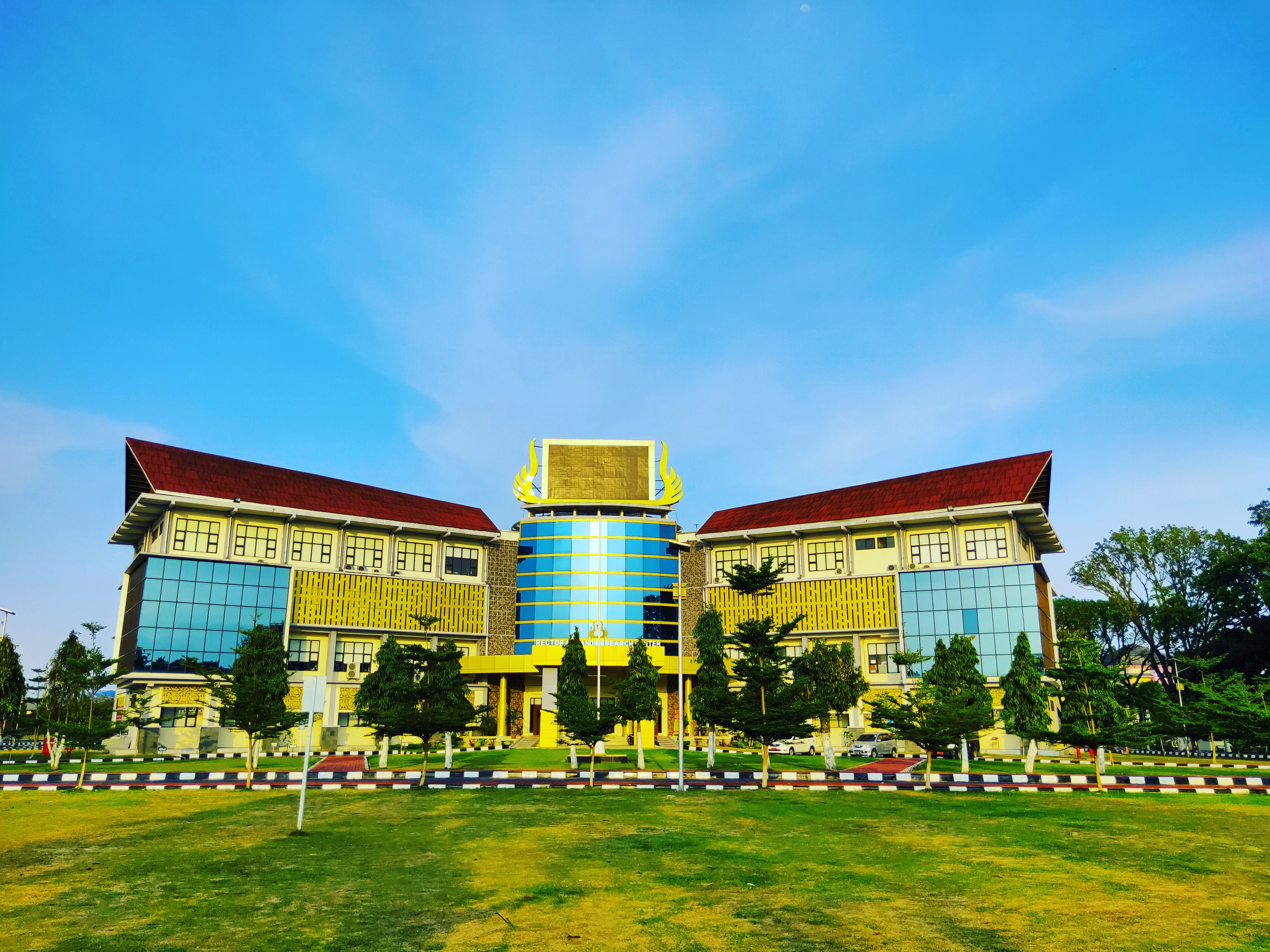
UNP Rectorate and Research Center

== Faculties ==
The university consists of nine faculties:

1. Faculty of Education
2. Faculty of Language and Arts
3. Faculty of Mathematics and Natural Sciences
4. Faculty of Social Science
5. Faculty of Engineering
6. Faculty of Sport Science
7. Faculty of Economics
8. Faculty of Hospitality and Tourism
9. Faculty of Graduate Studies
10. Faculty of Psychology and Health
11. Faculty of Medicine

== Rankings ==
University rankings

Global – Overall
- QS World: =1401+ (2026)
- QS Employability: 701+ (2026)

Regional – Overall
- QS Asia: 721 (2026)

Universitas Negeri Padang (UNP) consistently is widely recognized as one of the leading higher education institution in Sumatra.

The QS Asia University Rangkings 2026 has ranks Universitas Andalas as number 126 in South-eastern Asia. Meanwhile, in the QS World University Rankings 2026, the Universitas Negeri Padang ranked in 1401+ globally and ranked twenty-fifth in Indonesia.

In the Times Higher Education World University Rankings 2026, Universitas Negeri Padang is ranked in the range of 1501+ globally.

=== Subject ===
THE World University Rankings by Subject 2026
Subject	Global	National
Arts & humanities	-	-
Business & economics	-	-
Computer science	-	-
Education	▲301-400	▲3
Engineering	-	-
Law	-	-
Life sciences	-	-
Medical & Health	501-600	1
Physical sciences	▼1251+	▼17
Psychology	-	-
Social sciences	1001+	17
