= Kelok 9 =

Road in Indonesia

Coordinates: 0.069818°S 100.6974923°E

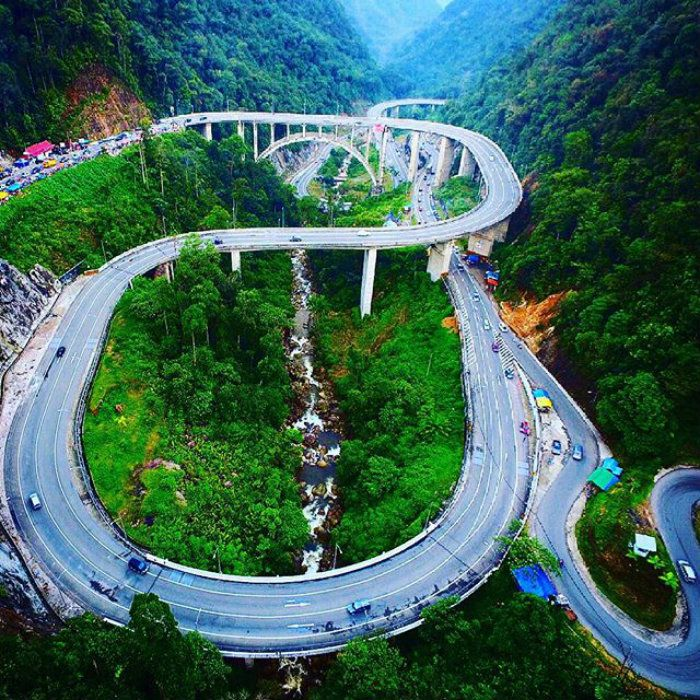

Route information
- Part of AH25
- Maintained by PT Jasamarga
- Length: 2.7 km (1.7 mi)
- Existed: 2013–present
- History: -

Major junctions
- From: West Sumatra
- To: Riau

Location
- Country: Indonesia
- Major cities: Pekanbaru, Bukittinggi, Payakumbuh

Highway system
- Transport in Indonesia

Kelok 9 or Kelok Sembilan is a winding road segment located about 30 km east of Payakumbuh, in the West Sumatera province of Indonesia. Kelok Sembilan means 9 sharp turns. This road stretches through Jorong Aie Putiah, Nagari Sarilamak, Harau sub-district of Lima Puluh Kota Regency of West Sumatera and is part of the interconnecting road link between Central Sumatra and the East Coast of Sumatra. The road has a sharp bend, bordering on a ravine, and flanked by two hills between two nature reserves: the White Water Reservation and the Harau Nature Reserve. The new overpass/flyover/bridge was officially inaugurated by then President Susilo Bambang Yudhoyono in October 2013.

== History ==
The road has existed since Dutch East Indies government between 1908-1914. This road winds across the Bukit Barisan that extends from north to south of Sumatra Island. If it is stretched straight, the length of the turn around was only 300 meters with a width of 5 meters and a height of about 80 meters. In 2000, vehicle traffic between West Sumatra and Riau had reached between 9,000 and 11,000 vehicles a day carrying about 15.8 million people and about 28.5 million tons of goods a year. Half of the goods transported are agricultural and livestock. Due to the narrowing of road in the turn around, the journey from Bukittinggi to Pekanbaru which should be taken within 4 hours, can take 5 to 6 hours. Addressing this issue, the Kelok 9 overpass construction began in November 2003 after obtaining central government approval through the National Development Planning Agency in August 2003.

== Overpass ==
Construction of Kelok 9 overpasses began in 2003. It was built over the old Kelok 9. The work was handled in two stages of development. The total length of the bridge and road built is 2,537 meters, consisting of six bridges with a length of 959 meters and a connecting road along 1,537 meters. Kelok Kelang bridge 9 consists of six bridges and has a width of 12.5 meters wide road. The first bridge spans have a length of 20 meters, a second span of 230 meters, and a third span 65 meters. The fourth span has a length of 462 meters. The fourth bridge span is a type of concrete arch bridge with a bore pile as deep as 20 meters to hold the bridge weight and the horizontal force of an earthquake. The fifth bridge spans a length of 31 meters and a sixth span of 156 meters. The cost of the project was US$49.5 million.

== See also ==
- West Sumatra
- Trans-Sumatran Highway
