= West Sumatra Regional House of Representatives =

Unicameral legislature of the Indonesian province of West Sumatra

West Sumatra Province Regional House of Representatives Dewan Perwakilan Rakyat Daerah Provinsi Sumatera Barat
- 2024–2029 Period
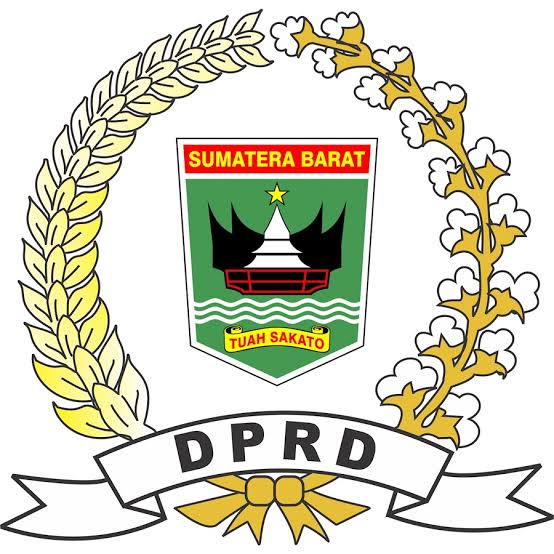

Type
- Type: Unicameral
- Term limits: 5 years

History
- New session started: 28 August 2024

Leadership
- Speaker: Muhidi, PKS since 9 October 2024
- Deputy Speaker: Evi Yandri Rajo Budiman, Gerindra since 9 October 2024
- Deputy Speaker: Muhammad Iqra Chissa Putra, Golkar since 9 October 2024
- Deputy Speaker: Nanda Satria, NasDem since 9 October 2024

Structure
- Seats: 65
- Political groups: Government (31): PKS (10); Gerindra (10); Democratic (8); PKB (3); Supported by (5): PPP (5); Opposition (29): NasDem (9); Golkar (9); PAN (8); PDI-P (3)
- Length of term: 5 years

Elections
- Voting system: Open listproportional representation
- Last general election: 14 February 2024
- Next general election: 2029

Meeting place
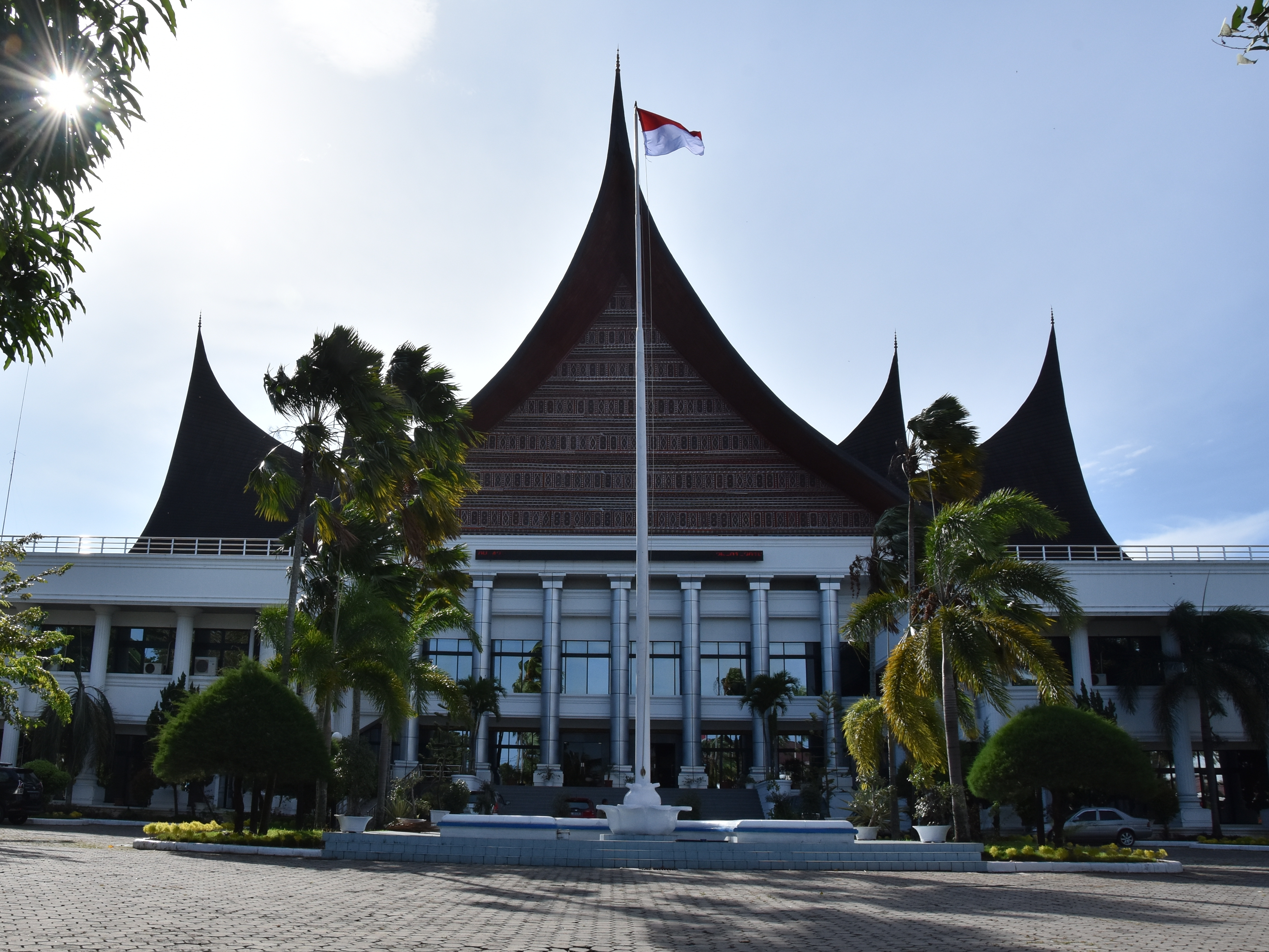
- Building DPRD Sumatra Barat; Padang, West Sumatra

Website
- http://dprd.sumbarprov.go.id

The West Sumatra Regional House of Representatives (Indonesian: Dewan Perwakilan Rakyat Daerah Provinsi Sumatera Barat, abbreviated DPRD Sumbar) is the unicameral legislative body within the regional government of the Indonesian province of West Sumatra. The house is composed of 65 members elected via party lists in the 2024 general election.

It convenes in the Gedung DPRD Sumatra Barat, North Padang District, Padang City.

== Composition ==
Party	Election				
Party	2004	2009	2014	2019	2024
Golkar	16	▼9	9	▼8	▲9
PDIP	4	▼3	▲4	▼3	3
PPP	7	▼4	▲8	▼4	▲5
PAN	10	▼6	▲8	▲10	▼8
PKS	7	▼5	▲7	▲10	10
PBB	5	▼3	▼1	▼0	0
PKB	0	0	▲1	▲3	3
PBR	3	▼2			
Demokrat	3	▲14	▼8	▲10	▼8
Gerindra		4	▲8	▲14	▼10
Hanura		5	5	▼0	0
Nasdem			6	▼3	▲9
Total	55	55	65	65	65

Did not participate

== Speakers ==
Legislative period	Name	Party
1987–1992	Bulkaini	Golkar
1992–1997	Djamil Bakar	Golkar
1997–1999	Brig. Gen. Noer Bahri Said Pamuncak	Golkar
1999–2004	Arwan Kasri	PAN
2004–2009	Leonardy Harmainy	Golkar
2009–2014	Yultekhnil	Demokrat
2014–2019	Hendra Irwan Rahim	Golkar
2019–2024	Supardi	Gerindra
2024–2029	Muhidi	PKS

== Electoral districts ==
In the 2014, 2019 and 2024 legislative elections, there were 65 seats for contest from 8 electoral districts:

- West Sumatra 1: Padang City (10 seats)
- West Sumatra 2: Padang Pariaman Regency and Pariaman City (7 seats)
- West Sumatra 3: Agam Regency and Bukittinggi City (8 seats)
- West Sumatra 4: Pasaman Regency and West Pasaman Regency (9 seats)
- West Sumatra 5: Lima Puluh Kota Regency and Payakumbuh City (6 seats)
- West Sumatra 6: Padang Panjang City, Tanah Datar Regency, Sawahlunto City, Sijunjung Regency and Dharmasraya Regency (11 seats)
- West Sumatra 7: Solok City, Solok Regency and South Solok Regency (7 seats)
- West Sumatra 8: Pesisir Selatan Regency and Mentawai Islands Regency (7 seats)
