= Pulau Punjung =

Coordinates: 0°58′S 101°30′E

- District
- Interactive map of Pulau Punjung
- Country: Indonesia
- Province: West Sumatra
- Regency: Dharmasraya
- Time zone: UTC+7 (WIB)

Pulau Punjung is a town and district (kecamatan) of Dharmasraya Regency, in West Sumatra Province of Indonesia and it is the seat (capital) of Dharmasraya Regency.
