= Dharmasraya Regency =

Regency in West Sumatra, Indonesia

Dharmasraya Regency Kabupaten Dharmasraya
- Regency
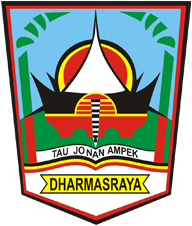
- Coat of arms
- Motto: Tau Jo Nan Ampek ("Know ye the four knowledges")
- Location within West Sumatra

- Location in Sumatra and Indonesia Dharmasraya Regency (Indonesia)
- Coordinates: 1.05°S 101.367°E
- Country: Indonesia
- Province: West Sumatra
- Regency seat: Pulau Punjung

Government
  - Regent: Annisa Suci Ramadhani
  - Vice Regent: Leli Arni

Area
  - Total: 2,961.13 km^{2} (1,143.30 sq mi)

Population (mid 2025 estimate)
  - Total: 248,105
  - Density: 83.7873/km^{2} (217.008/sq mi)
- Time zone: UTC+7 (IWST)
- Area code: (+62) 754
- Website: dharmasrayakab.go.id

Dharmasraya Regency is a landlocked regency (kabupaten) of West Sumatra province, Indonesia. It covers an area of 2,961.13 km^{2} and had a population of 191,422 at the 2010 Census and 228,591 at the 2020 Census; the official estimate as of mid 2025 was 248,105 (comprising 125,580 males and 122,520 females). In the past, this regency was the location of an independent Kingdom of Dharmasraya, which came to power in the 11th century.

Located at the southeastern tip of West Sumatra, Dharmasraya Regency spans eleven districts. The administrative centre is the town of Pulau Punjung. Its economy is primarily supported by agriculture, forestry, and fisheries, alongside wholesale and retail trade, vehicle repair services, and public-sector construction activities.

== Administrative districts ==
Dharmasraya Regency is divided into eleven districts (kecamatan), listed below with their areas and their populations at the 2010 Census and the 2020 Census, together with the official estimates as of mid 2025. The table also includes the locations of the district administrative centres, the number of administrative villages (nagari) in each district, and its post code.

Name of District (kecamatan)	Area in km^{2}	Pop'n 2010 Census	Pop'n 2020 Census	Pop'n mid 2025 Estimate	Admin centre	No. of villages (nagari)	Post code
Sungai Rumbai	47.63	17,989	22,489	24,900	Sungai Rumbai	4	27686
Koto Besar	488.19	22,876	26,939	29,890	Koto Besar	7	27685
Asam Jujuhan	257.72	10,539	9,502	9,470	Sungai Limau	5	27684
Koto Baru	251.35	28,776	32,519	34,270	Koto Baru	4	27681
Koto Salak	464.39	15,076	17,598	18,850	Koto Salak	5	27680
Tiumang	129.18	11,094	13,144	14,180	Tiumung	4	27687
Padang Laweh	59.76	5,368	6,462	7,020	Padang Laweh	4	27673
Sitiung	87.68	23,019	28,324	30,550	Sitiung	4	27678
Timpeh	237.93	13,460	16,909	18,760	Tabek	5	27679
Pulau Punjung	482.50	35,861	45,339	50,040	Sungai Dareh	6	27573
Sembilan Koto	454.80	7,344	9,366	10,180	Silago	4	27683
Totals	2,961.13	191,422	228,591	248,105	Pulau Punjung	52	

== Geography ==
Geographically, Dharmasraya Regency is situated at the southeastern tip of West Sumatra Province. Astronomically, it lies between 00º48'25.4"–01º41'40.3" South Latitude and 101º08'32.5"–101º53'30.3" East Longitude. According to Regional Regulation No. 4 of 2009, the regency covers an area of 2,961.13 km^{2} (296,113 hectares); however, mapping calculations based on digitized SPOT 5 imagery in the district's spatial plan estimate the area to be 3,025.99 km^{2} (302,599 hectares).

== Economy ==
The agriculture, forestry, and fisheries sector forms the backbone of Dharmasraya's economy, contributing approximately 25.98% (IDR 3.47 trillion) to its Gross Regional Domestic Product (GRDP) in 2023. Plantation commodities such as oil palm and rubber dominate the agricultural landscape, complemented by staple crops like rice and maize. Forestry activity adds economic value through timber and non-timber forest products, while freshwater fisheries are cultivated in man-made ponds and river systems.

The wholesale and retail trade sector, along with vehicle repair services, accounts for around 15.38% (IDR 2.05 trillion) of Dharmasraya's GRDP. The vehicle repair sub-sector contributes to Dharmasraya's GRDP by sustaining mobility and logistics operations essential to regional commerce. Economic activity revolves around the distribution of goods through both traditional marketplaces and modern retail networks. Local government construction expenditure contributes an estimated 14.96% (IDR 1.99 trillion) to the GRDP in 2023. This includes publicly funded physical development projects such as roads, bridges, public facilities, and service infrastructure.
