= List of people from West Sumatra =

List of people from West Sumatra:

Individuals on this list are either native-born West Sumatra or emigrants who have chosen West Sumatra as their permanent home.

== Actors ==
- Dorce Gamalama (1963-2022), actress, transsexual pop singer, presenter, and comedian (Solok)

== Authors ==
- Djamaluddin Adinegoro (1904–1967), reporter, writer, and political analyst (Sawahlunto)

== Lawyers and jurists ==
- Carl Langbehn (1901-1944), German lawyer and politician, who joined the Nazi Party in 1933. In 1944 he met British officials in Switzerland in order to determine options for a German surrender. Upon his return to Germany he was imprisoned by the Gestapo and later sentenced to death. (Padang)
- Saldi Isra (1968-), Indonesian Constitutional Court Justice.

== Political figures ==
- Dolf Joekes (1884-1962), Dutch politician, Minister of Social Affairs of the Netherlands, Minister of Health of the Netherlands
- Patrialis Akbar (born 1958), lawyer, Minister of Justice and Human Rights (Padang)
- Azwar Anas (born 1931), former governor of West Sumatra, former Coordinating Minister for People's Welfare (Padang)
- Assaat (1904–1976), former president Republic of Indonesia sat on Yogyakarta part of the United States of Indonesia (Agam Regency)
- Gamawan Fauzi (born 1957), Minister of Home Affairs (Solok)
- Abdul Halim (1911-1988), 4th Prime Minister of Indonesia (Bukittinggi)
- Mohammad Hatta (1902-1980), Indonesia's 1st vice president, later also serving as the country's Prime Minister (Bukittinggi)
- Mohammad Natsir (1908–1993), 5th Prime Minister of Indonesia (Solok)
- Rizal Nurdin (1948–2005), 14th and 15th Governor of North Sumatra (Bukittinggi)
- Rizal Ramli (born 1953), economist, former Coordinating Minister for Economics Affairs and Minister of Finance (Padang)
- Rasuna Said (1910–1965), nationalist political leader, and the first female minister of Indonesia (Agam Regency)
- Chairul Saleh (1916–1967), government minister and 3rd vice prime minister of Indonesia (Sawahlunto)
- Agus Salim (1884-1954), diplomat, foreign minister between 1947 and 1949 (Bukittinggi)
- Tifatul Sembiring (born 1961), chairman of the conservative and Islamic Prosperous Justice Party and Minister of Communication and Information (Bukittinggi)
- Sutan Sjahrir (1909—1966), 1st prime minister of Indonesia (Padang Panjang)
- Tarmizi Taher (born 1936), former Minister of Religious Affairs (Padang)
- Jusuf Wanandi (born 1937), vice general secretary of Golongan Karya party (Sawahlunto)
- Muhammad Yamin (1903–1962), former Information Minister, Minister of Education and Culture and Minister of Justice (Sawahlunto)
