= West Sumatra =

Province in Sumatra, Indonesia

West Sumatra Sumatera Barat
- Province
- Province of West Sumatra; Provinsi Sumatera Barat
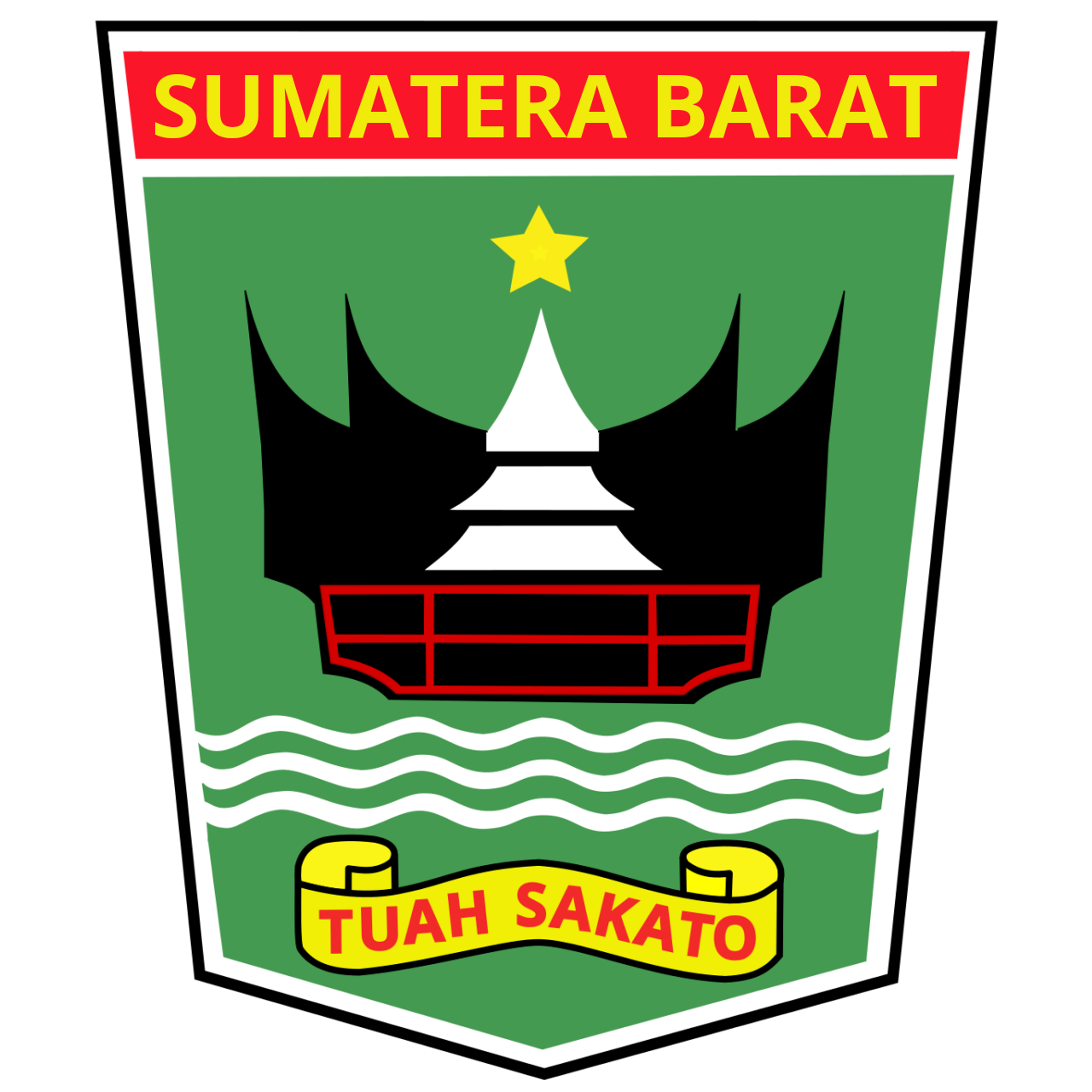
- Coat of arms
- Nickname: Ranah Minang (Minangkabau) "Land of Minangkabau"
- Motto: Tuah Sakato (Minangkabau) "Agree to Implement the Consensus Result"
- West Sumatra in Indonesia
- Interactive map of West Sumatra
- Coordinates: 1°00′S 100°30′E
- Country: Indonesia
- Region: Sumatra (Western Indonesia)
- Province status: 10 August 1957
- Capital and largest city: Padang

Government
  - Body: West Sumatra Provincial Government
  - Governor: Mahyeldi Ansharullah (PKS)
  - Vice Governor: Vasko Ruseimy
  - Legislature: West Sumatra Regional House of Representatives (DPRD)

Area
  - Total: 42,107.674 km^{2} (16,257.864 sq mi)
  - Rank: 16th in Indonesia
- Highest elevation (Mount Kerinci): 3,805 m (12,484 ft)

Population (mid 2025 estimate)
  - Total: 5,914,300
  - Rank: 11th in Indonesia
  - Density: 140.46/km^{2} (363.78/sq mi)

Demographics
  - Ethnic groups (2010): 87.33% Minangkabau; 4.61% Batak (mainly Mandailing); 4.49% Javanese; 1,43% Mentawai; 0.82% Malays; 0.38% Nias; 0.33% Sundanese; 0.22% Chinese; 0.39 other
  - Religion (2024): 97.56% Islam: 2.38% Christianity; 1.54% Protestantism; 0.84% Catholicism; 0.06% Buddhism
  - Languages: Indonesian (official); Minangkabau, Mentawai (native, regional); Batak, Malay
- Time zone: UTC+7 (Indonesia Western Time)
- ISO 3166 code: ID-SB
- GDP (nominal): 2022
- Total: Rp 285.4 trillion (13th); US$ 19.2 billion Int$ 60.0 billion (PPP)
- Per capita: Rp 50.6 million (22nd); US$ 3,407; Int$ 10,632 (PPP)
- Growth: ▲4.36%
- HDI (2024): ▲0.764 (6th) – high
- Website: sumbarprov.go.id

UNESCO World Heritage Site
- Official name: Ombilin Coal Mining Heritage of Sawahlunto
- Criteria: Cultural:
- Reference: 1610
- Inscription: 2019 (43rd Session)
- Area: 268.18 ha (662.7 acres)
- Buffer zone: 7,356.92 ha (18,179.3 acres)

West Sumatra (Indonesian: Sumatera Barat, Jawi: سومترا بارت) is a province of Indonesia. It is on the west coast of the island of Sumatra and includes the Mentawai Islands off that coast. West Sumatra borders the Indian Ocean to the west, as well as the provinces of North Sumatra to the north, Riau to the northeast, Jambi to the southeast, and Bengkulu to the south. The province has an area of 42,107.674 km^{2} (16,257.864 sq mi), or about the same size as Switzerland or Penza Oblast, with a population of 5,534,472 at the 2020 census. The official estimate at mid 2025 was 5,914,300 (comprising 2,979,710 males and 2,934,590 females). The province is subdivided into twelve regencies and seven cities. It has relatively more cities than other provinces outside Java, although several of them are relatively low in population compared with cities elsewhere in Indonesia. Padang is the province's capital and largest city.

West Sumatra is home to the Minangkabau people, although the traditional Minangkabau region is actually wider than the province's boundaries, covering up to the western coast of North Sumatra, the southwestern coast of Aceh, the western region of Riau, the western region of Jambi, the northern region of Bengkulu, and Negeri Sembilan in Malaysia. Another native ethnic group is the Mentawai people, who inhabit the western islands of the same name. Islam is a predominant religion in the province, with about 97.4% of the total population.

West Sumatra was the centre of the Pagaruyung Kingdom, founded by Adityawarman in 1347. The first European to come to the region was a French explorer and cartographer named Jean Parmentier who arrived around 1523. The region was later colonised by the Dutch Empire and became a residency named Sumatra's West Coast (Dutch: Sumatra's Westkust), whose administrative area included the present-day Kampar Regency in Riau and Kerinci Regency in Jambi. Before becoming a province in 1957, West Sumatra was a part of the province of Central Sumatra (1948–1957), alongside Riau, Jambi, and the Riau Islands.

== Etymology ==
West Sumatra is known by the name Bumi Minangkabau (Land of Minangkabau), as it is the home and origin of the Minangkabau people. The Minangkabau name comes from two words namely, Minang (win) and Kabau (cattle). The name is associated with a Minangkabau legend known as Tambo. From the Tambo, it is said that at one time there was a foreign kingdom (usually interpreted as the Majapahit Empire) which came from the sea and would conquer what is now West Sumatra. To prevent fighting in the region, the local people propose a cattle race competition with the foreign forces. The foreign forces agreed and sent a large and aggressive cattle to the competition, while the local community sent a cattle calf who was still breastfeeding to the competition. In the competition, the cattle calf who was still breastfeeding thought the large and aggressive cattle was the mother. So the calf immediately ran towards the large and aggressive cattle to find milk until he tore apart the big cattle's stomach. The victory inspired the local people to use the name Minangkabau, which comes from the phrase "Manang kabau" (winning cattle). The story of the Tambo is also found in the Hikayat Raja-raja Pasai which also mentions that the victory made the country that was previously named Pariangan changed to the name Minangkabau. Furthermore, the use of the name Minangkabau is also used to refer to a nagari (village), namely the Nagari Minangkabau, which is located in Sungayang District, Tanah Datar Regency.

In the historical record of the Majapahit Empire, Nagarakretagama which dated from 1365, also mentioned the name Minangkabwa as one of the Malay countries that has been conquered by the Majapahit. Likewise in the Ming Chronicles from 1405, there was the royal name of Mi-nang-ge-bu of the six kingdoms who sent messengers facing Yongle Emperor in Nanjing. On the other hand, the name Minang (Minanga kingdom) itself has also been mentioned in the Kedukan Bukit inscription dated from 682 which is written in Sanskrit. In the inscription, it was stated that the founder of the Srivijaya Empire named Dapunta Hyang departed from a place called Minānga. Some experts who refer to the source of the inscription suspects that the 4th line words (... minānga) and the 5th line words (tāmvan ...) are actually incorporated, so that they become mināngatāmvan and are translated as the meeting point of twin rivers. The twin river is supposed to refer to the meeting of two sources of the Kampar River, namely the Kampar Kiri River and the Kampar Kanan River. But this hypothesis is denied by the Dutch indologist Johannes Gijsbertus de Casparis, which proves that tāmvan has nothing to do with "meeting point", because these can also be found in other Srivijaya relics.

== History ==
=== Prehistoric era ===
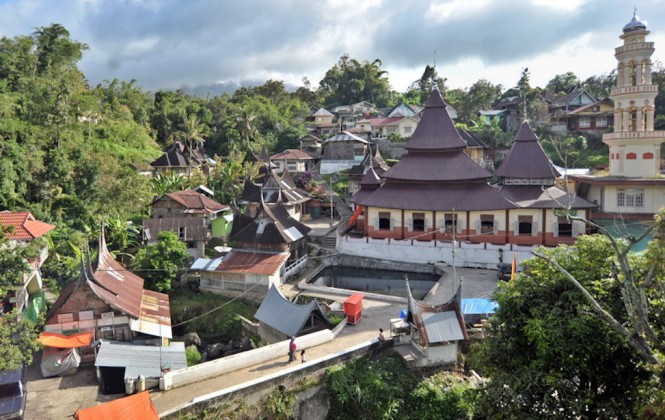
The village of Pariangan, located on the slopes of Mount Marapi, In folklore is said to be the first Minangkabau village.

From the stories of the tambo passed from generation to generation, the ancestors of the Minangkabau people were the descendants of Iskandar Zulkarnain (Alexander the Great). This tambo story is more or less comparable to the Malay Annals who also tells how the Minangkabau people sent their representatives to ask Sang Sapurba, one of the descendants of Iskandar Zulkarnain, to become their king.

The Minang community is part of the Deutro-Malay community who migrated from Southern China to the island of Sumatra around 2,500–2,000 years ago. It is estimated that this community group entered from the east of the island of Sumatra, along the Kampar River to the highlands called darek which became the home of the Minangkabau people. Some of these darek areas then form a kind of confederation known as luhak, which is then referred to as Luhak Nan Tigo, which consists of Luhak Tanah Data, Luhak Agam, and Luhak Limopuluah Koto. During the era of the Dutch East Indies, the luhak area became a territorial government area called afdeling, headed by a resident who by the Minangkabau community was called the name Tuan Luhak. Initially, The Minangkabau people were included as a sub-group of the Malays, but since the 19th century, the Minangkabau and the Malays began to be seen as distinguished, from the matrilineal culture of the Minangkabau that persisted compared to the patrilineal culture adopted by Malay society in general.

=== Precolonial era ===
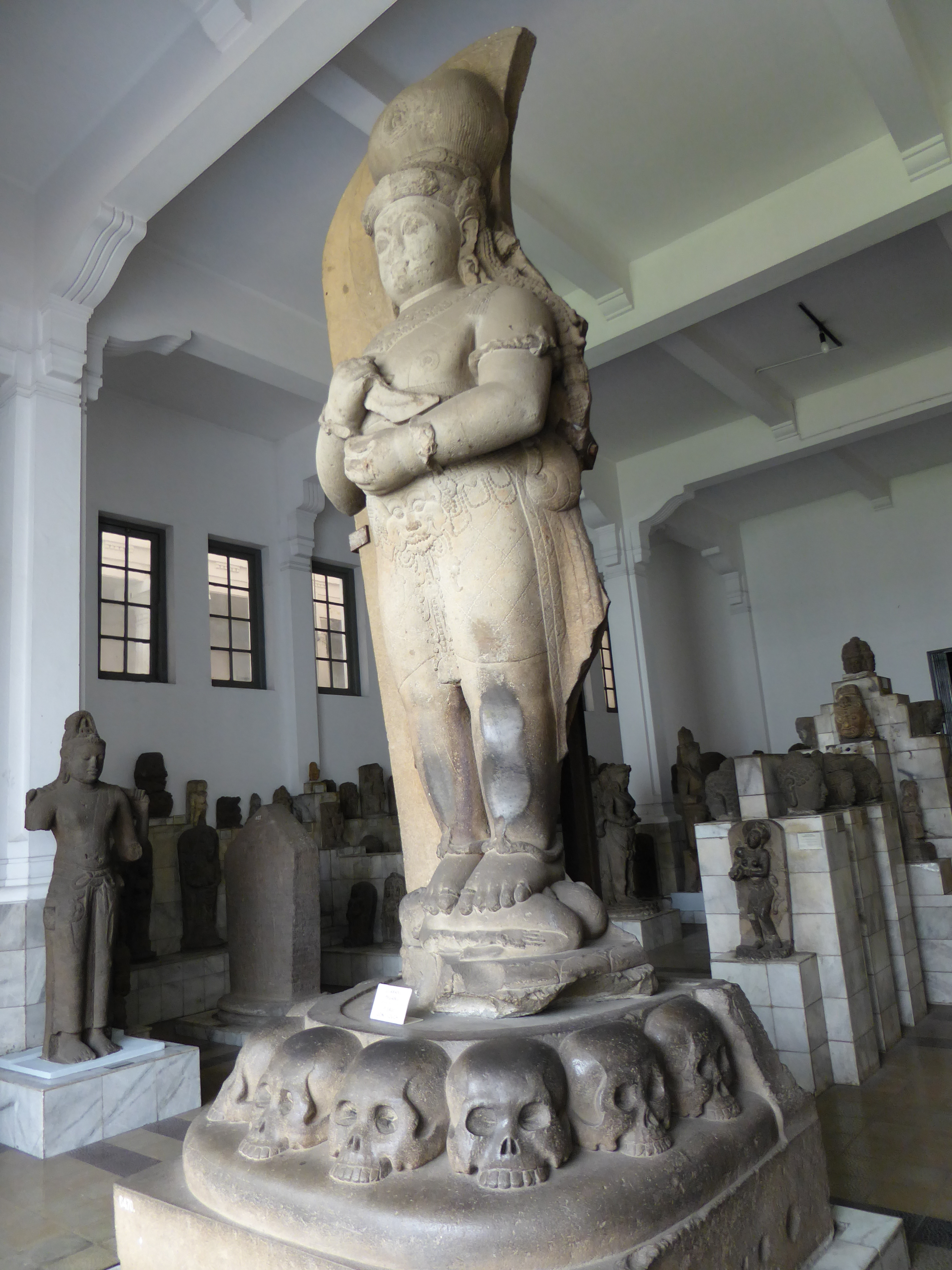
A statue believed to be Adityawarman, founder of a Minangkabau kingdom.

According to the Minangkabau Tambo, in the period between the 1st century to the 16th century, many small kingdoms stood on what is now West Sumatra. These kingdoms included the Kuntu, Kandis, Siguntur, Pasumayan Koto Batu, Batu Patah, Sungai Pagu, Inderapura, Jambu Lipo, Taraguang, Dusun Tuo, Bungo Setangkai, Talu, Kinali, Parit Batu, Pulau Punjung. These kingdoms were short lived, and are usually under the influence of larger kingdoms, such as Malayu and Pagaruyung.

The Malayu Kingdom is estimated to have appeared in the year 645 thought to be located in the upper reaches of the Batang Hari River. Based on the Kedukan Bukit inscription, this kingdom was conquered by the Srivijaya in 682. And then in 1183 it appeared again based on the Grahi inscription in Cambodia, and then the Negarakertagama and Pararaton recorded the existence of the Malay Kingdom which had its capital in Dharmasraya. A military expedition to West Sumatra called the Pamalayu emerged in 1275–1293 under the leadership of Kebo Anabrang of the Singasari Kingdom. After the submission of the kingdom recorded on the Amoghapasa carved on the Padang Roco Inscription, the Pamalayu returned to Java with the daughters of King Dharmasraya, Dara Petak and Dara Jingga. Dara Petak was married to Raden Wijaya, the king of Majapahit, as well as the heir to the Singhasari kingdom, while Dara Jingga was married to Adwayawarman. Jayanagara was born from the marriage of Raden Wijaya and Dara Petak, who would become the second king of Majapahit, while Adityawarman was born from the marriage of Dara Jingga and Adwayawarman; he later became king of the Pagaruyung Kingdom.

Hindu-Buddhist influence in western Sumatra emerged around the 13th century, and began during the Pamalayu expedition by Kertanagara, and later during the reign of Adityawarman and his son Ananggawarman. Adityawarman's kingdom had the strength to dominate the central Sumatra region and its surrounding. This was proven by the title Maharajadiraja which was held by Adityawarman recorded on the back of the Amoghapasa carving, found in the upper reaches of the Batang Hari River (now part of the Dharmasraya Regency). The Batusangkar inscription mentioned Ananggawarman as a yuvaraja performing the Tantris teaching ritual from Buddhism called hevajra which is the ceremony of the transfer of power from Adityawarman to his crown prince, this can be attributed to the Chinese chronicle of 1377 about the San-fo-ts'i messenger to the Emperor of China requesting recognition as ruler of the San-fo-ts'i region. Some inland areas of central Sumatra are still influenced by Buddhism, evident in the Padangroco temple, the Padanglawas temple and Muara Takus temple, the areas that were formerly part of Adityawarman's land. Whereas the recorded devout adherents besides Adityawarman, were Kublai Khan and king Kertanegara of Singhasari.

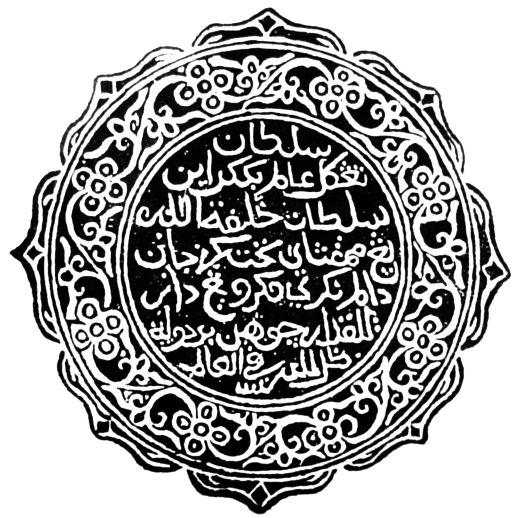
Minangkabau royal seal from the 19th century, written in Jawi script

The spread of Islam after the end of the 14th century had little effect, especially relating to the patrilineal system, and gave a relatively new phenomenon to the people in the interior of Minangkabau. At the beginning of the 16th century, the Suma Oriental, written between 1513 and 1515, recorded from the three Minangkabau kings, only one of whom had been a Muslim convert from 15 years before. The influence of Islam in Pagaruyung developed around the 16th century, namely through travelers and religious teachers who stopped or came from Aceh and Malacca. One of the famous ulama of Aceh, Abd al-Rauf al-Sinkili, was a cleric who was thought to first spread Islam in Pagaruyung. By the 17th century, the Kingdom of Pagaruyung transformed itself into an Islamic sultanate. The first Islamic king in the Minangkabau traditional culture was Sultan Alif.

With the entry of Islam, the customary rules that are contrary to the teachings of Islam began to be replaced with the Islamic-based customary law. There is a famous Minangkabau custom proverb, "Adat basandi syarak, syarak basandi Kitabullah", which means that the Minangkabau adat is based on Islam, while Islam is based on the Qur'an. But in some cases, several systems and methods of adat were still maintained causing the outbreak of civil war known as the Padri War. The war was initially between the ulamas and the Adats, who were the Minangkabau nobility and traditional chiefs; later, the Dutch involved themselves in the war.

Islam also had an influence on Pagaruyung kingdom's government system with the addition of government elements such as Tuan Kadi and several other terms related to Islam. The naming of the Sumpur Kudus District, which contains the words derived from the word Quduus (holy) as the seat of Rajo Ibadat and Limo Kaum which contains the word qaum is an influence from Arabic or Islam. In addition, in the adat, the term Imam, Katik (Khatib), Bila (Bilal), Malin (Mu'alim), which is a substitute for Hindu and Buddhist terms used previously, such as the term Pandito (priest), also appears.

=== Colonial era ===
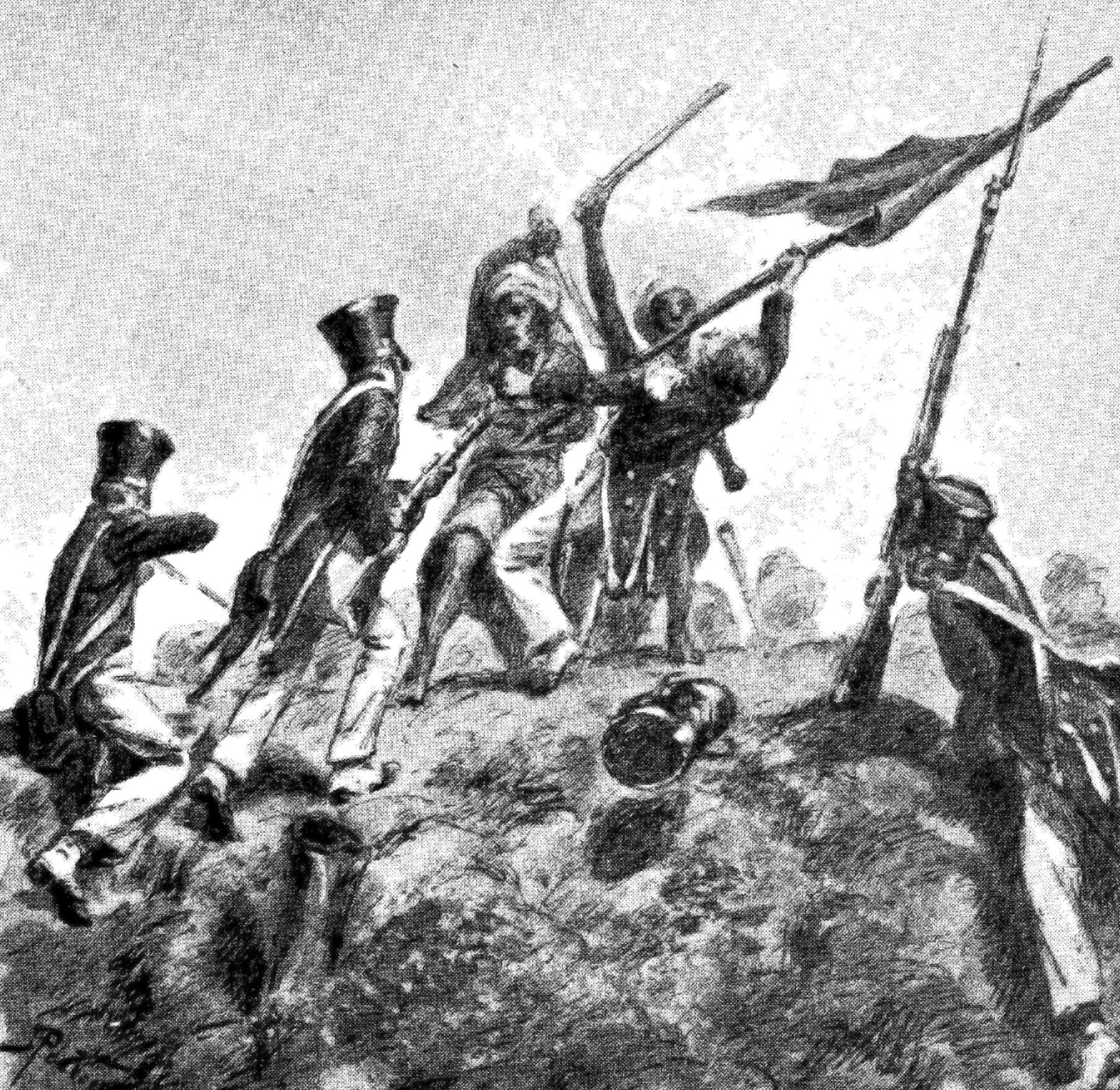
Dutch forces charging towards Minangkabau position during the Padri Wars

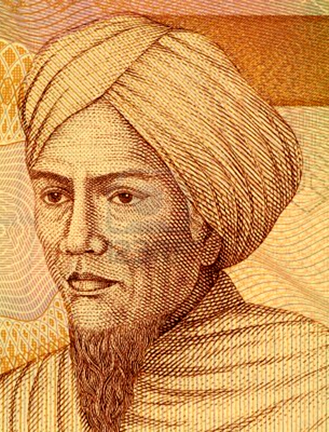
Tuanku Imam Bonjol was one of the leader of the Padri movement during the Padri War. Ultimately he was captured the Dutch and was exiled to the Celebes

At the beginning of the 17th century, the Pagaruyung Kingdom was forced to recognize the sovereignty of the Aceh Sultanate, and to recognize the designated Aceh governors for the west coast of Sumatra. But around 1665, the Minangkabau people on the west coast rebelled against the Aceh governor. From the letter of the Minangkabau ruler Raja Pagaruyung submitted a request to the Dutch East India Company (VOC), and the VOC at that time took the opportunity to end Aceh's monopoly on gold and pepper. Furthermore, the VOC through its regent in Padang, Jacob Pits whose territory included from Kotawan in the south to Barus in the north sent a letter dated October 9, 1668 addressed to the Ahmadsyah Sultan, Iskandar Zur-Karnain, the Minangkabau ruler who was rich in gold, was told the VOC controlled the west coast area so that the gold trade can be re-flowed through the coast. According to Dutch records, Sultan Ahmadsyah died in 1674 and was replaced by his son Sultan Indermasyah. When the VOC succeeded in expelling the Aceh Sultanate from the coast of West Sumatra in 1666, Aceh's influence weakened on Pagaruyung. The relationship between the outer regions and the coast with the Kingdom of Pagaruyung becomes closer. At the time Pagaruyung was one of the trading centers on the island of Sumatra, due to its production of gold, it attracted the attention of the Dutch and the British to establish relations with Pagaruyung. It is recorded that in 1684, a Portuguese explorer named Tomas Dias paid a visit to Pagaruyung at the behest of the Dutch governor general in Malacca.

Around 1750, the Pagaruyung kingdom began to dislike the presence of the VOC in Padang and once tried to persuade the British who were in Bengkulu to expel the Dutch from the region which the British did not respond to. But in 1781, the British managed to control Padang for a short period of time, and messengers from Pagaruyung congratulated the success of the British in expelling the Dutch from Padang. Minangkabau land has long been considered rich in gold, and at that time the power of the Minangkabau king was divided into king Suruaso and the king of Sungai Tarab with the equal power. Previously in 1732, the VOC regent in Padang had noted that there was a queen named Yang Dipertuan Puti Jamilan who had sent spears and swords made from gold, as a sign of her inauguration as the ruler of the land. While the Dutch and British succeeded in reaching the interior of the Minangkabau region, they had never found significant gold reserves in the area.

As a result of the conflict between the British and French in the Napoleonic Wars where the Dutch were on the French side, the British fought the Dutch and again succeeded in taking control of the coast of West Sumatra between 1795 and 1819. The British governor Thomas Stamford Raffles visited Pagaruyung in 1818, when the Padri War began. At that time Raffles discovered that the capital city of the kingdom had been burned because of the war. After the signing of a peace agreement between the British and the Netherlands was signed in 1814, the Dutch re-entered Padang in May 1819. The Dutch reaffirmed their influence on the island of Sumatra and Pagaruyung, with the signing of the Anglo-Dutch Treaty of 1824. The power of the king of Pagaruyung was very weak in the days leading up to the Padri war, although the king was still respected by his subject. The areas on the western coast fell into the influence of Aceh, while Inderapura on the southern coast practically became an independent kingdom although officially still under the rule of the king of Pagaruyung.

In the early 19th century a conflict broke out between the Padri and the Adat. In several negotiations there was no agreement between them. Pagaruyung's kingdom was in turmoil, and the peak of the war was when the Padri under the leadership of Tuanku Pasaman attacked Pagaruyung in 1815. Sultan Arifin Muningsyah was forced to abdicate and escape from the royal capital to Lubuk Jambi. Under pressure by the Padri, the Pagaruyung royal family requested assistance from the Dutch, and before that they had conducted diplomacy with the British when Raffles visited Pagaruyung and promised them assistance. On February 10, 1821, Sultan Tangkal Alam Bagagarsyah, the nephew of Sultan Arifin Muningsyah, in Padang along with 19 other traditional leaders signed an agreement with the Dutch to cooperate in fighting the Padri, even though he was considered not entitled to make an agreement on behalf of the kingdom of Pagaruyung. As a result of this agreement, the Netherlands considered it a sign of surrender of the kingdom of Pagaruyung to the Dutch government. After the Dutch captured Pagaruyung from the Padri, in 1824 at the request of Lieutenant Colonel Raaff, Sultan Arifin Muningsyah returned to Pagaruyung, but in 1825, Sultan Arifin Muningsyah, the last king in Minangkabau, died and was later buried in Pagaruyung. Sultan Tangkal Alam Bagagarsyah on the other hand wanted to be recognized as the king of Pagaruyung, but the Dutch East Indies government had limited his authority and only appointed him the Regent of Tanah Datar. Because of the policy it encouraged Sultan Tangkal Alam Bagagarsyah to start thinking about expelling the Dutch from the region.

After emerging victorious from the Diponegoro War in Java, the Dutch then tried to conquer the Padri with shipments of soldiers from Java, Madura, Celebes and the Moluccas. But the Dutch colonial ambitions caused the Adat and the Padri to forget their differences in secret to drive the Dutch away. On 2 May 1833 Sultan Tangkal Alam Bagagarsyah was captured by Lieutenant Colonel Elout in Batusangkar on charges of treason. He was exiled to Batavia (present-day Jakarta) until his death, and was buried in the Mangga Dua cemetery. After the fall, the influence and prestige of the kingdom of Pagaruyung remained high, especially among Minangkabau people who were overseas. One of Pagaruyung's royal heirs was invited to become a ruler in Kuantan, Malaysia. Likewise when Raffles was still on duty in the Malay Peninsula, he met Pagaruyung's relatives who were in Negeri Sembilan, and Raffles intended to appoint Yang Dipertuan Ali Alamsyah who he considered to be the direct descendant of the Minangkabau kings as a king under British protection. After the end of the Padri War, Tuan Gadang of Batipuh asked the Dutch East Indies government to give a higher position than just as the Tanah Datar Regent which he held after replacing Sultan Tangkal Alam Bagagarsyah, but this request was rejected by the Dutch, this later included one of the drivers of the outbreak of the 1841 rebellion in Batipuh in addition to the cultuurstelsel problem.

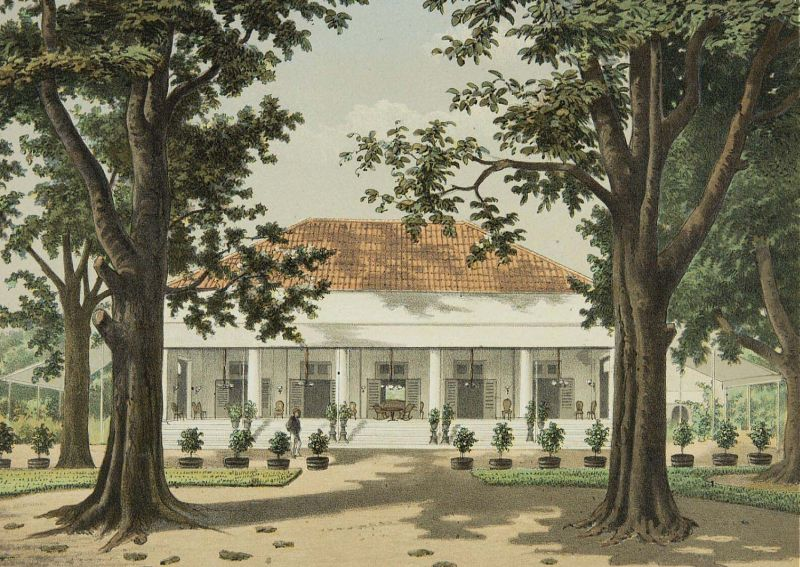
The residence of the governor of Westkust van Sumatra

The name West Sumatra originated in the Vereenigde Oostindische Compagnie (VOC) era, where the designation of the area for the west coast of Sumatra was Hoofdcomptoir van Sumatra's Westkust. Then with the strengthening of the political and economic influence of the VOC, until the 18th century this administrative region included the west coast of Sumatra from Barus to Inderapura. Along with the fall of the Kingdom of Pagaruyung, and the involvement of the Dutch in the Padri War, the Dutch East Indies government began to make the interior of Minangkabau a part of Pax Nederlandica, an area under Dutch supervision, and the Minangkabau region was divided into the Residentie Padangsche Benedenlanden and the Residentie Padangsche Bovenlanden. Furthermore, in the development of the colonial administration of the Dutch East Indies, this area was incorporated in the Gouvernement Sumatra's Westkust, including the Residentie Bengkulu region which had just been surrendered by the British to the Dutch. Then expanded again by including Tapanuli and Singkil. But in 1905, the status of Tapanuli was upgraded to Residentie Tapanuli, while the Singkil area was given to Residentie Atjeh. Then in 1914, Gouvernement Sumatra's Westkust, was demoted to Residentie Sumatra's Westkust, and added the Mentawai Islands region in the Indian Ocean into Residentie Sumatra's Westkust, and in 1935 the Kerinci region was also incorporated into Residentie Sumatra's Westkust. After the breakdown of the Gouvernement Sumatra's Oostkust, the Rokan Hulu and Kuantan Singingi regions were given to Residentie Riouw, and Residentie Djambi was also formed in almost the same period.

=== Japanese occupation and Independence ===
During the Japanese occupation, Residentie Sumatra's Westkust changed its name to Sumatora Nishi Kaigan Shu. On the basis of military geo-strategy, the Kampar area was separated from Sumatora Nishi Kaigan Shu and incorporated into the territory of Rhio Shu.

At the beginning of Indonesian independence in 1945, the West Sumatra region was incorporated in the Sumatra province based in Bukittinggi. Four years later, Sumatra Province was divided into three provinces: North Sumatra, Central Sumatra, and South Sumatra. West Sumatra, Riau and Jambi were part of the residency within the province of Central Sumatra. During the PRRI rebellion, based on emergency law number 19 of 1957, Central Sumatra Province was further divided into three provinces: West Sumatra Province, Riau Province, and Jambi Province. The Kerinci region which was previously incorporated in the South Sumatra Regency of Kerinci, was incorporated into Jambi Province as a separate regency. Likewise, the Kampar, Rokan Hulu and Kuantan Singingi areas are designated as part of Riau Province.

Communism in Sumatra has historically had an influence in the politics and society of Sumatra. Padang, Pariaman, Silungkang, Sawahlunto, Alahan Panjang, and Suliki of West Sumatra have been cited as areas which were particularly active in communism. During the PRRI rebellion, the insurgents arrested leftist activists and placed them in detention camps in West Sumatra. PKI cadres were detained at Situjuh and Suliki, while followers of the national communist Murba Party and other groups were detained at the Muara Labuh camp. Incidentally, Hadji Abdullah Ahmad, a noted anti-communist and religious leader was from the Minangkabau Highlands, where communism was active. Numerous examples of anti-communist resentment also occurred, for instance during the Indonesian killings of 1965–1966, PKI-organised squatters' movements and campaigns against foreign businesses in Sumatra's plantations provoked quick reprisals against Communists. Repression against alleged PKI members and sympathizers continued for several years. As late as 1976 mass lay-offs of former members of the communist plantation workers' union Sarbupri members took place in Sumatra, actions motivated by the communist past of these individuals.

== Geography ==
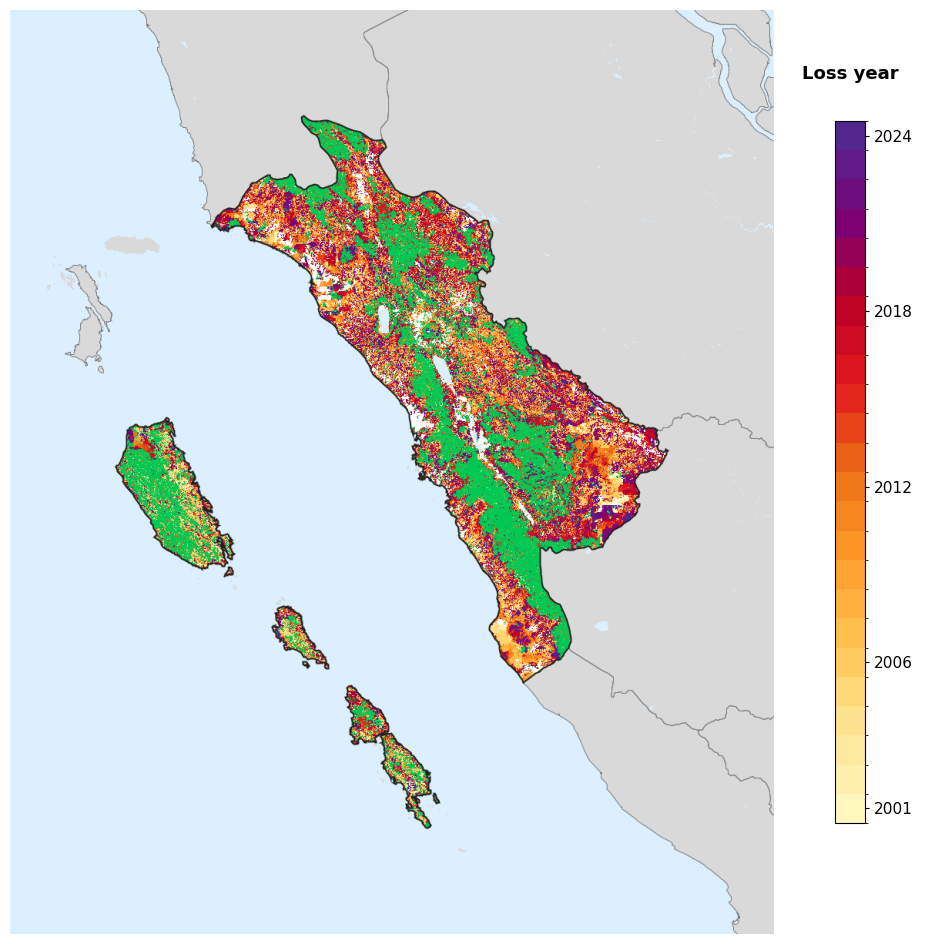
Tree-cover loss year in West Sumatra, 2001-2024, from the Global Forest Change dataset.

West Sumatra lies in the middle of the western coast of Sumatra, and has an area of 42,119.54 km^{2}. Geographic features include plains, mountainous volcanic highlands formed by the Barisan mountain range that runs from north-west to south-east, and an offshore island archipelago called the Mentawai Islands. The West Sumatran coastline faces the Indian Ocean and stretches 375 km from North Sumatra province in the north-west to Bengkulu in the south-east. The lakes of West Sumatra include: Maninjau (99.5 km^{2}), Singkarak (130.1 km^{2}), Diatas (31.5 km^{2}), Dibawah (14.0 km^{2}) and Talang (5.0 km^{2}). Most of the rivers in West Sumatra flow into the Strait of Malacca, include: Batanghari, Kampar, Ombilin and Sinamar, and others flow into the Indian Ocean, include: Kuranji, Anai and Arau. The mountains and volcanoes of West Sumatra include: Kerinci (3,805 m), Talakmau (2,912 m), Marapi (2,891 m), Singgalang (2,877 m), Talang (2,572 m), Tandikat (2,438 m) and Sago (2,271 m).

West Sumatra is one of the earthquake-prone areas in Indonesia, due to its location in the tectonic slab located between the confluence of two major continental plates (the Eurasian Plate and Indo-Australian Plate) and Great Sumatran fault, plus the activity of the active volcanoes. Large earthquakes that occurred recently in West Sumatra earthquake were the 2009 Sumatra earthquake and the 2010 Mentawai earthquake and tsunami. The area was also affected by the 2004 Indian Ocean Tsunami.

This region has a tropical monsoon climate, similar to most other Indonesian provinces. Throughout the year the province is only affected by two seasons, namely the rainy season and the dry season. The air temperature varies from 24.7 to 32.9 degrees Celsius with air humidity levels ranging from 82% to 88%. The relative rainy season falls from October to April. Variation in rainfall ranges from 2,100 mm to 3,264 mm. The month December is the month with the most rainfall. While the dry season usually starts in June to September.

The season in West Sumatra is similar to other regions in Indonesia, only known for two seasons, namely the dry season and the rainy season. From June to September wind flows from Australia and do not contain much water vapor, resulting in a dry season. Conversely in December to March many wind currents contain water vapor from Asia and the Pacific Ocean during the rainy season. Such conditions occur every half-year after passing the transition period in between April – May and October – November.

As in most other province of Indonesia, West Sumatra has a tropical rainforest climate (Köppen climate classification Af) bordering on a tropical monsoon climate. The climate is very much dictated by the surrounding sea and the prevailing wind system. It has high average temperature and high average rainfall.

=== Flora and fauna ===
The province includes large areas of dense tropical forest, which is home to a host of species including: Rafflesia arnoldii (world's largest flower), Sumatran tiger, siamang, Malayan tapir, Sumatran serow, rusa deer, Malayan sun bear, Bornean clouded leopard, and many birds and butterflies.

The province includes two national parks: Siberut National Park and Kerinci Seblat National Park, as well as a number of nature reserves: Rimbo Panti Nature Reserve, Batang Palupuh Nature Reserve, Lembah Anai Nature Reserve, Lembah Harau Nature Reserve, Bung Hatta Grand Forest Park, and Beringin Sakti Nature Reserve.

== Government ==
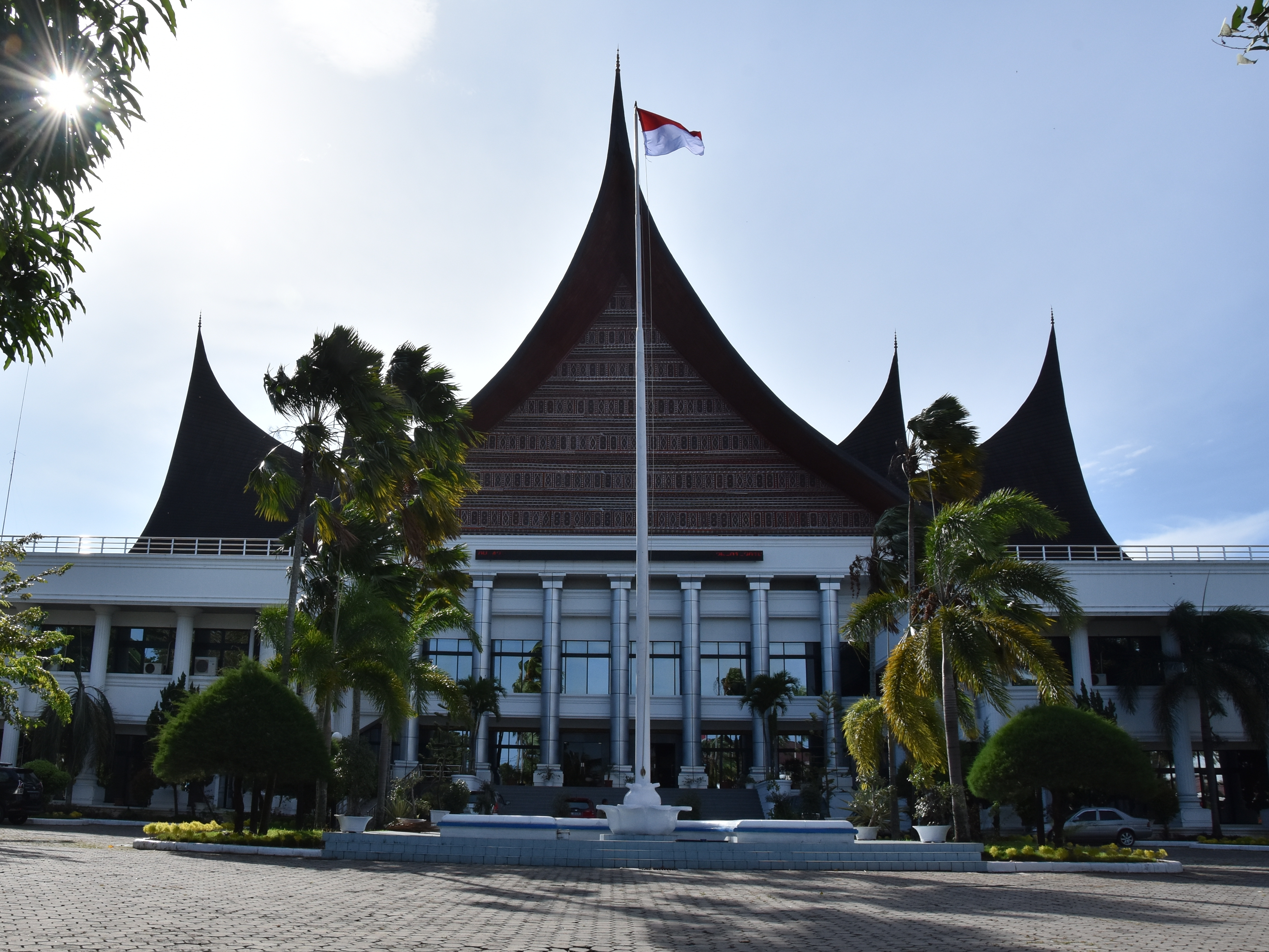
West Sumatra's parliament (DPRD) building

West Sumatra is led by a governor who is elected directly with his representative for a 5-year term. In addition to being a regional government, the Governor also acts as a representative or extension of the central government in the province, whose authority is regulated in Law No. 32 of 2004 and Government Regulation number 19 of 2010.

While the relationship between the provincial government and the regency and city governments is not a sub-ordinate, each of these regional governments governs and manages government affairs according to the principle of autonomy and co-administration.

=== Nagari ===
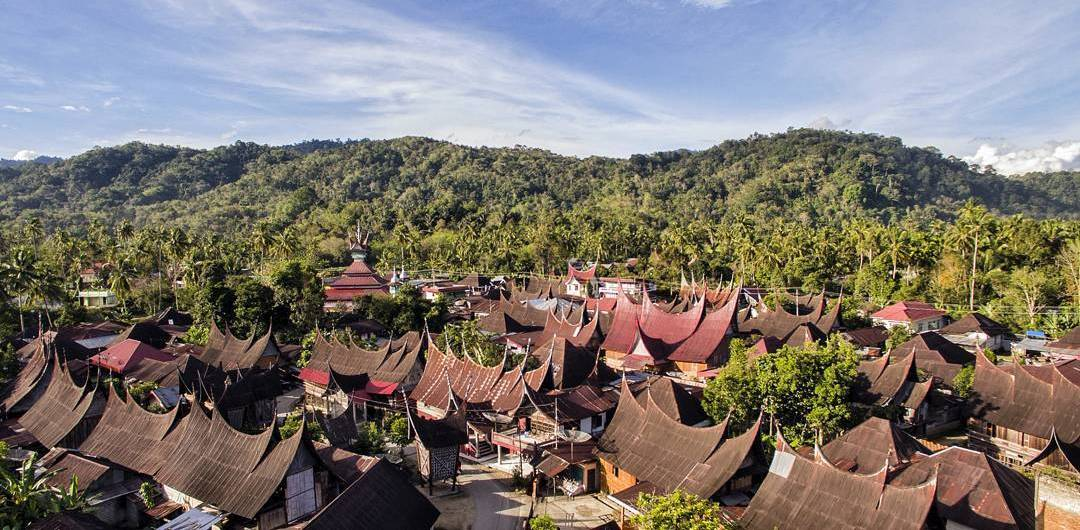
Minangkabau settlement in Nagari Koto Baru, now known as Seribu Rumah Gadang.

Until 1979, the smallest administrative unit in West Sumatra was called a nagari, which had existed before Indonesian independence. With the enactment of Law No. 5 of 1979 concerning village governance, the status of nagari was eliminated and replaced with villages, and several jorong statuses were upgraded to villages. The position of nagari guardians was also removed and government administration was carried out by village heads. But since the onset of government reform and regional autonomy, since 2001, the term nagari has been used again in this province.

The political culture that lived in the West Sumatra village government since the policy of uniformity (Law No. 5 of 1979) was applied to the parochial political culture. this condition is seen through the power system, the ruling system, the terms of the ruler, and the role of the ruler in the village government.

The kinship system in developing participant political culture began to shift, in terms of the level of sensitivity, the form of tolerance in kinship, and the role of seniority in kinship. This means that the lack of togetherness in the kinship power system.

Nagari government is an autonomous government structure, has a clear territory and adheres to adat as a regulator of the life of its members. the regency replaced the term village government that was used previously. Whereas for the nagari in the city government system still as a traditional institution, it has not become part of the regional government structure.

Opportunities that occur in village government are the emergence of individualistic economic growth. This condition is a result of dependence on the central government, resulting in lack of independence. This condition can weaken the resilience of the area of the economy itself. However, now the villages of West Sumatra have tried to build efforts to facilitate the political policies of the village government or since exchanging back into nagari, namely changing the structure and process between village government structures made under Law No. 5 of 1979.

Nagari was initially led jointly by the princes or datuk in the nagari, then during the Dutch East Indies government one of the princes was chosen to become the guardian of the Nagari - the Wali Nagari. Then in running the government, the nagari guardians are assisted by a number of jorong or jorong guardians, but now assisted by the nagari secretary and civil servants depending on the needs of each nagari. This nagari guardian was originally elected by the anak nagari (nagari residents) democratically in direct elections for six years in office. Today the nagari heads are elected in the same terms as regents and the provincial governor and vice governor.

=== Administrative divisions ===
West Sumatra Province is subdivided into twelve regencies and seven autonomous cities, which lie outside any regency. The regencies and cities are listed below with their areas and their populations at the 2010 Census and 2020 Census, together with the official estimates as at mid 2025.

Cities of West Sumatra

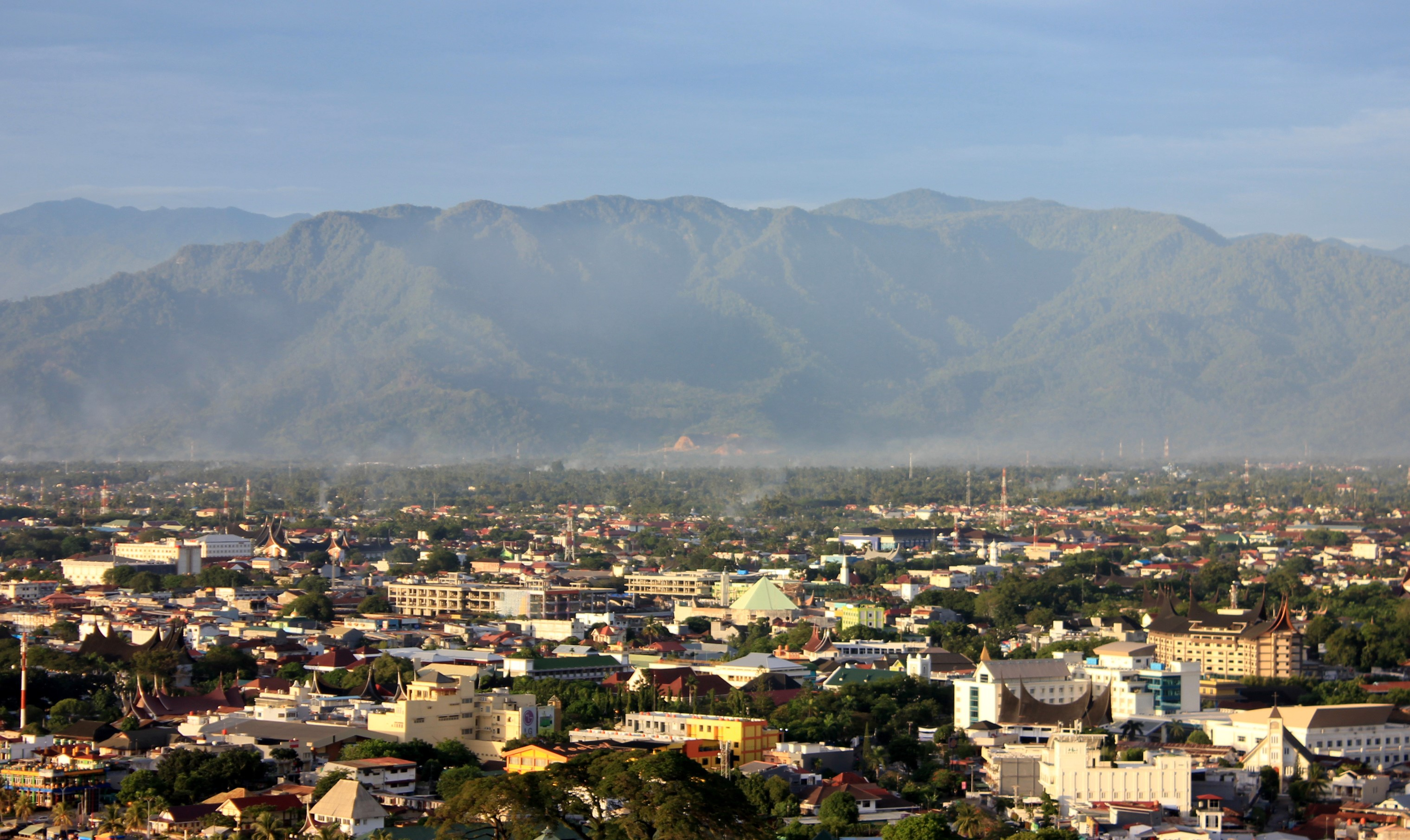
The city of Padang is the administrative center of the province.

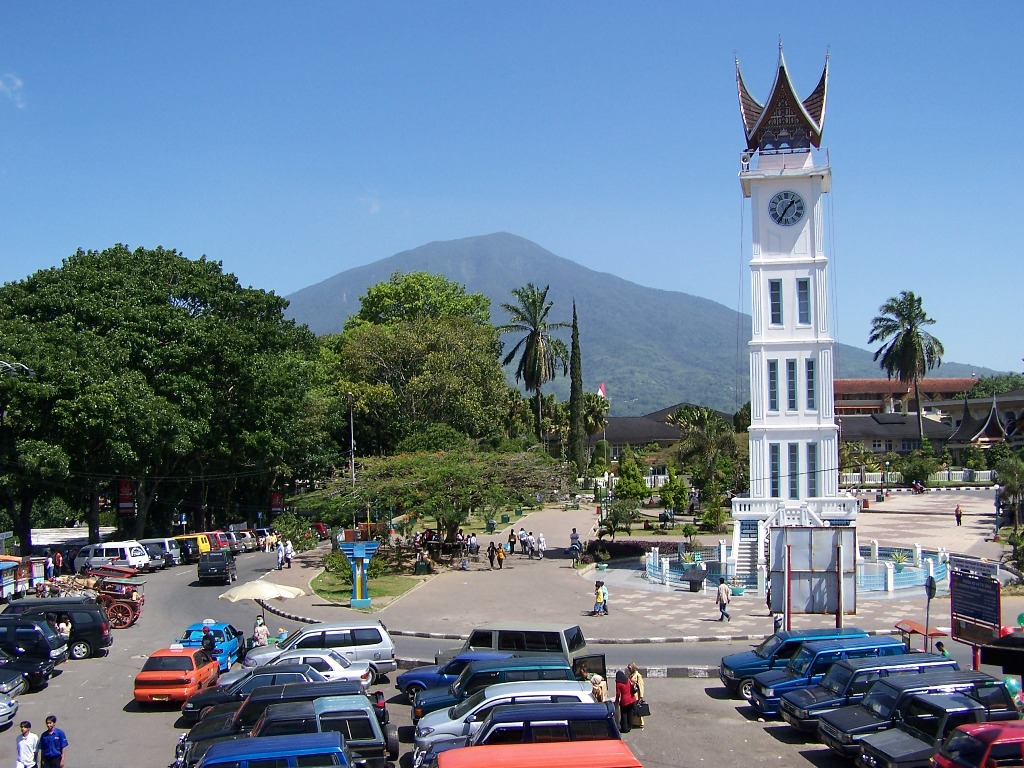
Bukittinggi is known as a leading tourist city in West Sumatra.

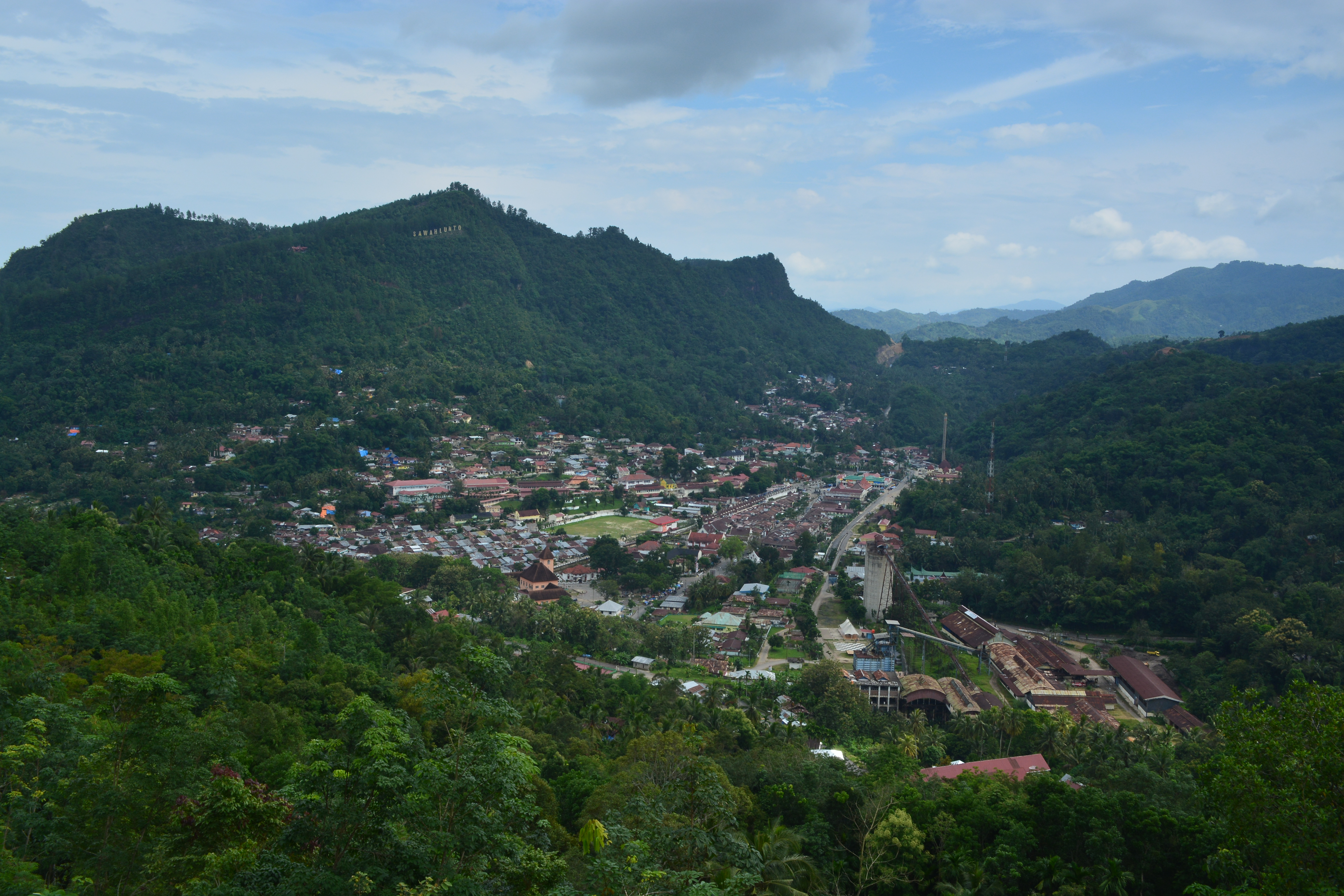
Once a large coal-mining centre, Sawahlunto is now a thriving tourist city.

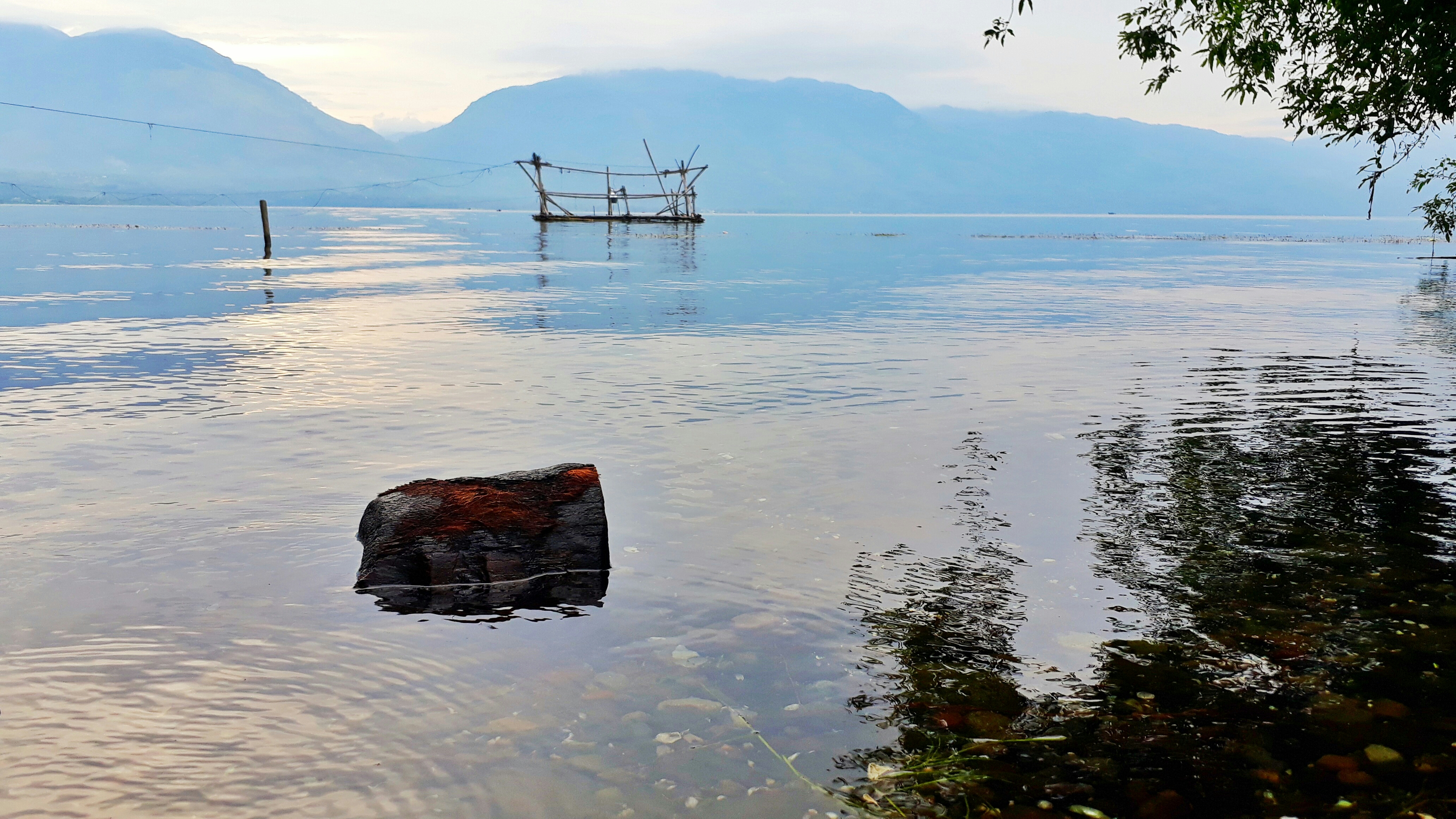
Solok is known as the nearest city to Lake Singkarak.

| Kode Wilayah | Name of City or Regency | Regency Capital | Area in km^{2} | Pop'n 2010 Census | Pop'n 2020 Census | Pop'n mid 2025 Estimate |
|---|---|---|---|---|---|---|
| 13.01 | Mentawai Islands Regency (Kepulauan Mentawai) | Tua Pejat | 5,973.92 | 76,173 | 87,623 | 94,050 |
| 13.02 | Pesisir Selatan Regency | Painan | 6,045.68 | 429,246 | 504,418 | 540,380 |
| 13.03 | Solok Regency | Aro Suka | 3,590.40 | 348,566 | 391,497 | 415,440 |
| 13.04 | Sijunjung Regency | Muaro Sijunjung | 3,150.58 | 201,823 | 235,045 | 249,790 |
| 13.05 | Tanah Datar Regency | Batusangkar | 1,377.19 | 338,494 | 371,704 | 392,740 |
| 13.06 | Padang Pariaman Regency | Parit Malintang | 1,341.88 | 391,056 | 430,626 | 467,040 |
| 13.07 | Agam Regency | Lubuk Basung | 2,225.34 | 454,853 | 529,138 | 566,760 |
| 13.08 | Lima Puluh Kota Regency | Sarilamak | 3,273.41 | 348,555 | 383,525 | 405,710 |
| 13.09 | Pasaman Regency | Lubuk Sikaping | 3,902.44 | 253,299 | 299,851 | 322,930 |
| 13.10 | South Solok Regency (Solok Selatan) | Padang Aro | 3,282.14 | 144,281 | 182,077 | 198,510 |
| 13.11 | Dharmasraya Regency | Pulau Punjung | 2,920.93 | 191,422 | 228,591 | 248,110 |
| 13.12 | West Pasaman Regency (Pasaman Barat) | Simpang Empak | 3,851.88 | 365,129 | 431,672 | 462,790 |
| 13.71 | Padang City | | 694.32 | 833,562 | 909,040 | 965,050 |
| 13.72 | Solok City | | 58.72 | 59,396 | 73,438 | 81,060 |
| 13.73 | Sawahlunto City | | 231.95 | 56,866 | 65,138 | 69,700 |
| 13.74 | Padang Panjang City | | 23.56 | 47,008 | 56,311 | 60,260 |
| 13.75 | Bukittinggi City | | 24.17 | 111,312 | 121,028 | 125,920 |
| 13.76 | Payakumbuh City | | 74.55 | 116,825 | 139,576 | 148,600 |
| 13.77 | Pariaman City | | 64.63 | 79,043 | 94,224 | 99,440 |

The cities and regencies are together sub-divided into 179 districts (kecamatan) and thence into 1,265 villages (kelurahan and desa) as at 2025. The coastal cities and regencies include 219 offshore islands (those large enough to have individual names), of which 111 comprise the Mentawai Islands Regency, 26 are in West Pasaman Regency, 2 in Agam Regency, 2 in Padang Pariaman Regency, 4 in Pariaman City, 21 in Padang City and 49 in South Pesisir Regency.

==== Human Development Index ====
Cities and Regencies in West Sumatra in order of the Human Development Index (HDI). The figures come from the 2024 West Sumatera Human Development Report, published by Statistics Indonesia.

| Rank | City / Regency | HDI Score (2024) |
Very high human development
| 1 | Padang City | 0.843 |
| 2 | Bukittinggi City | 0.826 |
| 3 | Payakumbuh City | 0.807 |
| 4 | Padang Panjang City | 0.806 |
| 5 | Pariaman City | 0.804 |
| 6 | Solok City | 0.800 |
High human development
| 7 | Sawahlunto City | 0.766 |
| 8 | Tanah Datar Regency | 0.764 |
| – | West Sumatra | 0.764 |
| 9 | Agam Regency | 0.750 |
| 10 | Padang Pariaman Regency | 0.749 |
| 11 | Dharmasraya Regency | 0.748 |
| 12 | South Solok Regency | 0.731 |
| 13 | Sijunjung Regency | 0.728 |
| 14 | Pesisir Selatan Regency | 0.728 |
| 15 | West Pasaman Regency | 0.727 |
| 16 | Lima Puluh Kota Regency | 0.725 |
| 17 | Solok Regency | 0.722 |
| 18 | Pasaman Regency | 0.706 |
Medium human development
| 19 | Mentawai Islands Regency | 0.666 |

As a new regency, Dharmasraya got the highest score (59.43) in 2011 from a possible 100 among other new regencies.

Before the reforms of 1999 and the implementation of regional autonomy in 2001, the lowest local government unit under the district administrations was the Javanese model of the village, the desa. Under regional autonomy, the traditional Minangkabau nagari, which are larger than villages elsewhere in Indonesia, have been reintroduced in place of the desa.

The province comprises two of Indonesia's 84 national electoral districts to elect members to the People's Representative Council. The West Sumatra I Electoral District consists of seven of the regencies in the province (Mentawai Islands, Pesisir Selatan, Solok, Sikunjung, Tanah Datar, South Solok and Dharmasraya), together with four cities (Padang Panjang, Padang, Solok and Sawahlunto), and elects eight members to the People's Representative Council. The West Sumatra II Electoral District consists of the remaining five regencies (Padang Pariaman, Agam, Lima Puluk Kota, Pasaman and West Pasaman), together with the three cities of Bukittinggi, Pariaman and Payakumbuh, and elects six members to the People's Representative Council.

== Demographics ==
The census population of West Sumatra was 2.8 million in 1971, 3.4 million in 1980, 4.0 million in 1990, 4.25 million in 2000, 4.85 million in 2010, and 5.53 million in 2020, of whom 2,786,360 were male and 2,748,112 were female. In 2010, 88% were recorded by the Badan Pusat Statistik as Minangkabau people. Batak people, mainly from Mandailing sub-ethnic group, and Javanese comprised 4% of the population respectively, while Mentawai people, who live in the Mentawai islands, made up 1%. The population as at mid 2025 was officially estimated at 5,914,300 and it was projected to reach 5,991,590 at mid 2026.

In 2015, about 44.2% of West Sumatran lived in urban areas. Most of the urban population of West Sumatra is concentrated in the centre-west coast of province and Minangkabau Highlands. West Sumatra has three cities with populations over 100,000. Padang is the major metropolitan areas with a city population of 965,050 in mid 2025; Minangkabau highlands cities of Payakumbuh and Bukittinggi rank as West Sumatra's next most populous cities, with populations of 148,600 and 126,760 respectively in mid 2025.

=== Ethnicity ===
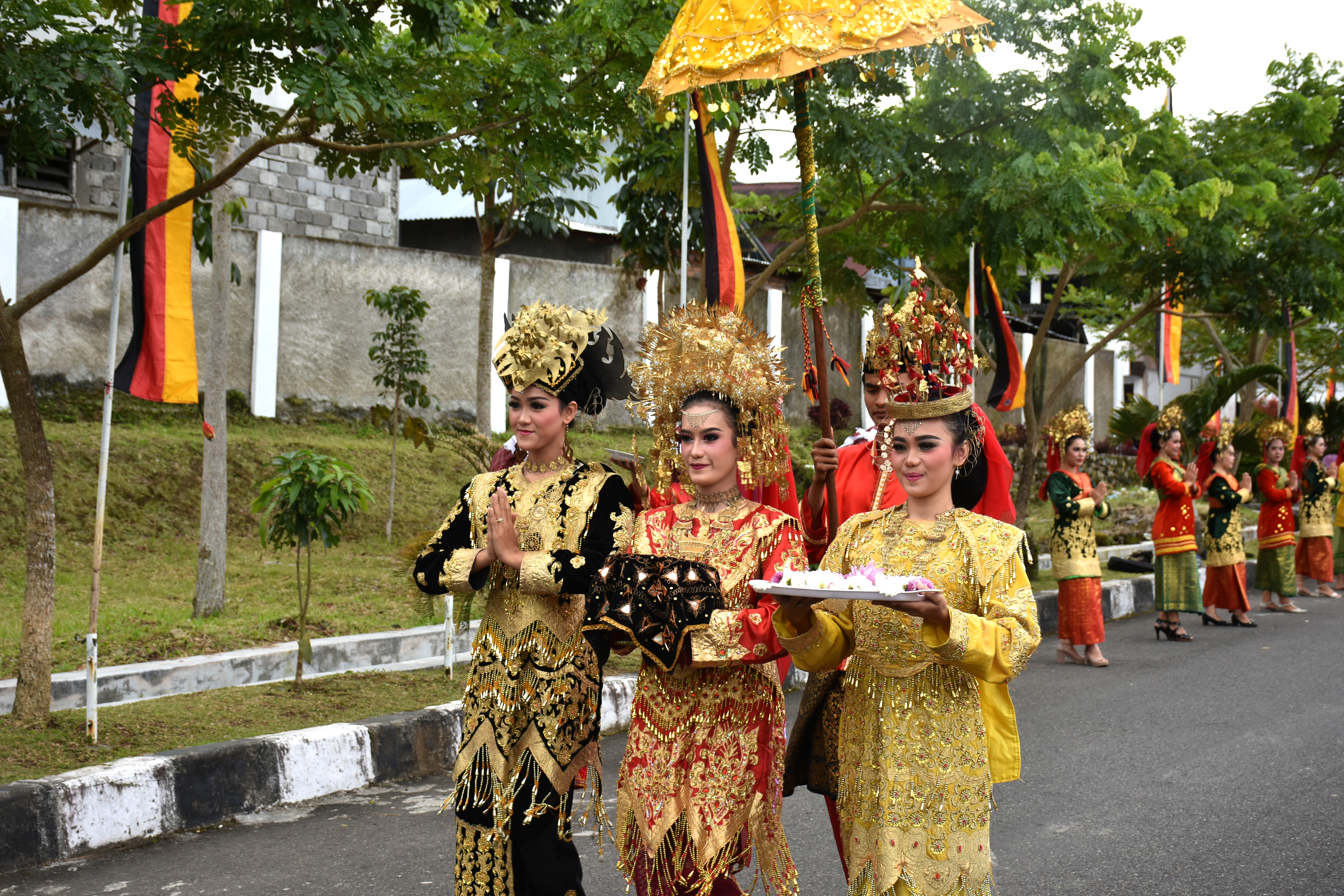
Minangkabau people at the cultural parade.

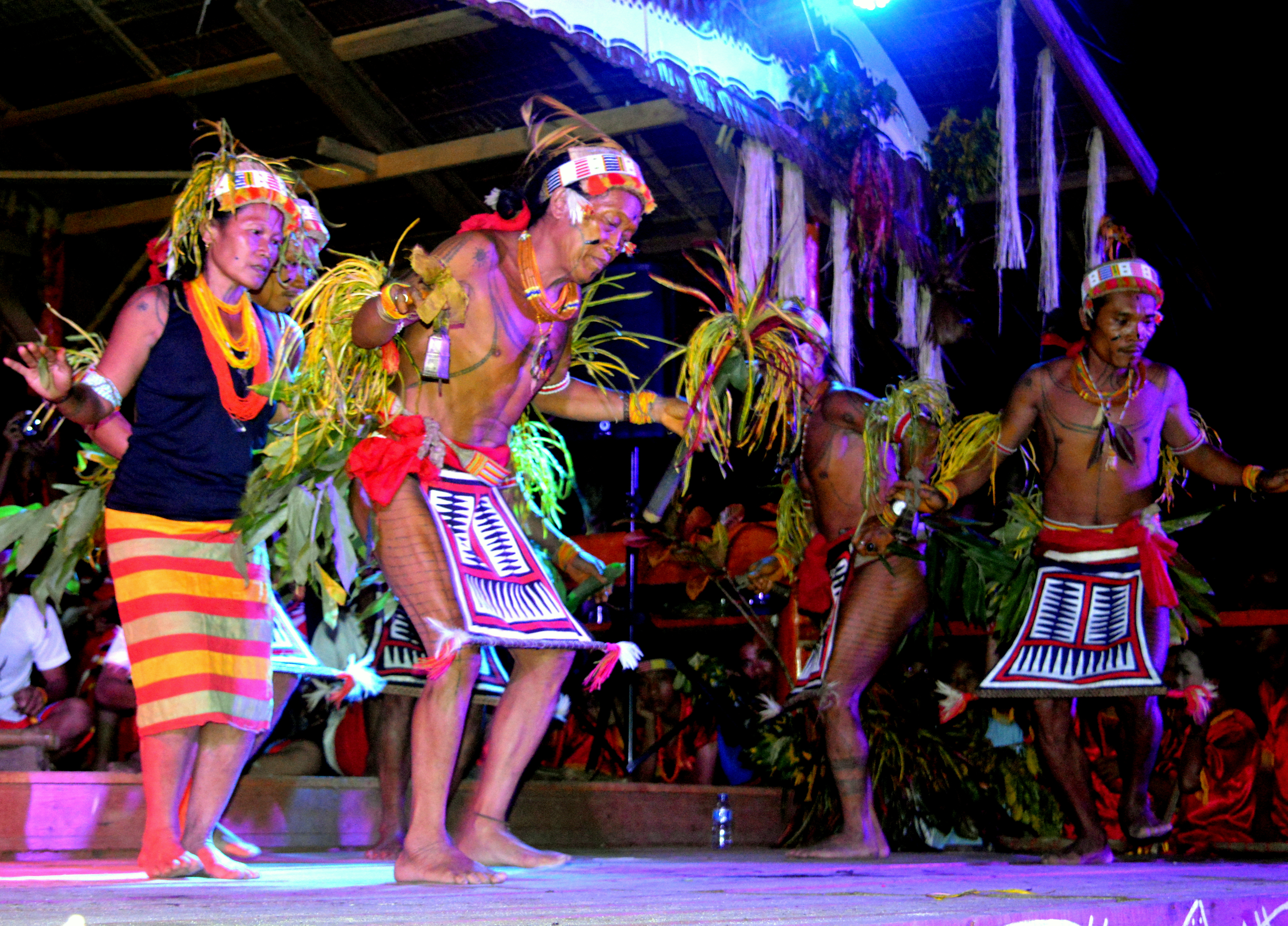
Mentawai people performing their traditional dance

West Sumatra is the native homeland of Minangkabau people. They speak Minangkabau language and are predominantly Muslim. West Sumatran have historically played the important role within the Muslim community in Indonesia. Up until today, the region is considered one of the strongholds of Islam in Indonesia. They have a reputation as traders, intellectuals as well as politically savvy people who have successfully exported their culture, language, cuisine and beliefs throughout Indonesia.

Mentawaians live on the Mentawai Islands, off the western coast of Sumatra, and are also part of the native people of province. They speak Mentawai languages, which are intelligible with neither Indonesian nor Minangkabau. A small minority of the Mentawais are Christians. In the Mentawai Islands, where the majority of the population is Mentawai, it is rare to find Minangkabau people. Chinese Indonesian are mostly only found in big cities, such as Padang, Bukittinggi, and Payakumbuh. In Padang and Pariaman, there are also small numbers of Nias and Tamil people.

=== Language ===
The language used in everyday life in West Sumatra is the Minangkabau language which has several dialects, such as the Bukittinggi dialect, Pariaman dialect, South Coastal dialect, and Payakumbuh dialect. In the Pasaman and West Pasaman regions bordering North Sumatra, the Batak Mandailing dialect is also spoken. Meanwhile, in the Mentawai archipelago, the Mentawai language is widely used. Tamil is spoken by Tamils in Padang.

Indonesian is widely understood as a second-language. It is used as the language of education as well as interethnic communication.

=== Religion ===
West Sumatra Grand Mosque

Based on 2024 data from the Ministry of Home Affairs, the majority of the population of West Sumatra adheres to Islam, amounting to 97.56%. Another 2.38% follow Christianity, especially in the Mentawai Islands, where Protestants and Catholics form the majority. A small portion adheres to Buddhism—0.06%—mostly ethnic Chinese living in cities such as Padang, Bukittinggi, Payakumbuh, Padang Panjang, and Solok. Meanwhile, followers of Hinduism and indigenous beliefs make up less than 0.01%.

According to 2021 data from the Central Statistics Agency (Badan Pusat Statistik, BPS), West Sumatra has 5,218 mosques and 9,661 musallas or small prayer houses for Muslims. For Christians, there are 267 Protestant churches, 62 worship halls, and 131 Catholic churches. Additionally, there are eight Buddhist viharas and one Hindu temple, the latter located in the city of Padang.

Various places of worship, which are dominated by mosques and musallas, can be found in every district and city in West Sumatra. The largest mosque is the Grand Mosque of West Sumatra Grand Mosque of West Sumatra in Padang. The mosque features a building shaped like a gonjong (the upward-curving Minangkabau roof), decorated with Minangkabau carvings as well as calligraphy. The oldest mosques include the Ganting Grand Mosque in Padang and the Tuo Kayu Jao Mosque in Solok Regency. The typical Minangkabau architecture dominates both the form of the mosque and the musala. There is also a mosque with a roof consisting of several levels, which are getting smaller and more concave.

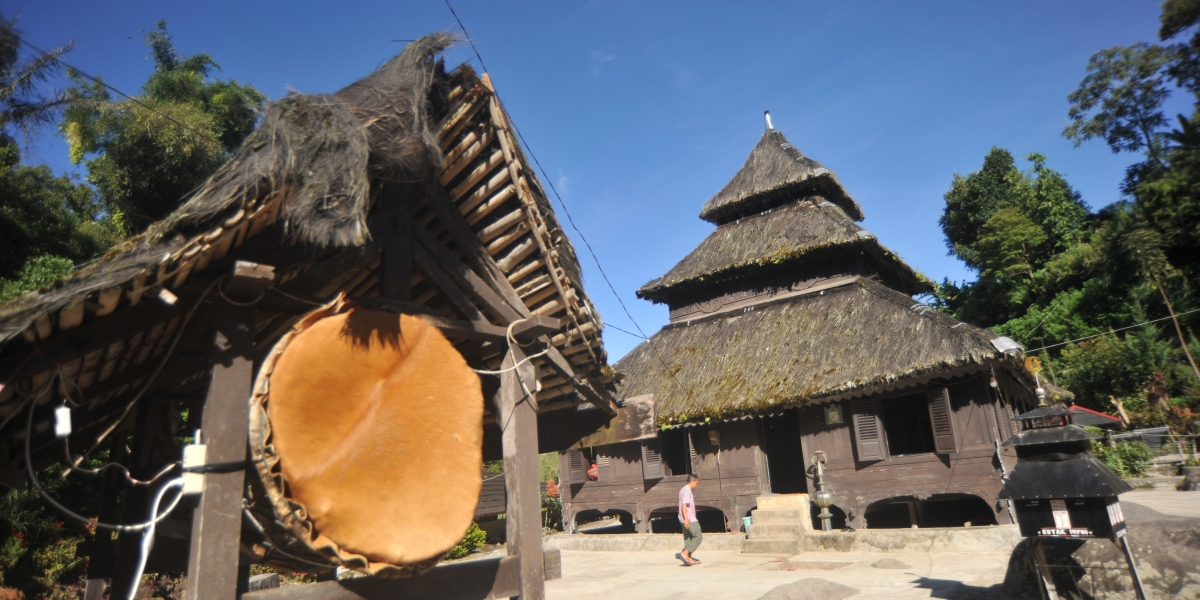
Tuo Kayu Jao Mosque in Solok, one of oldest mosques in Indonesia

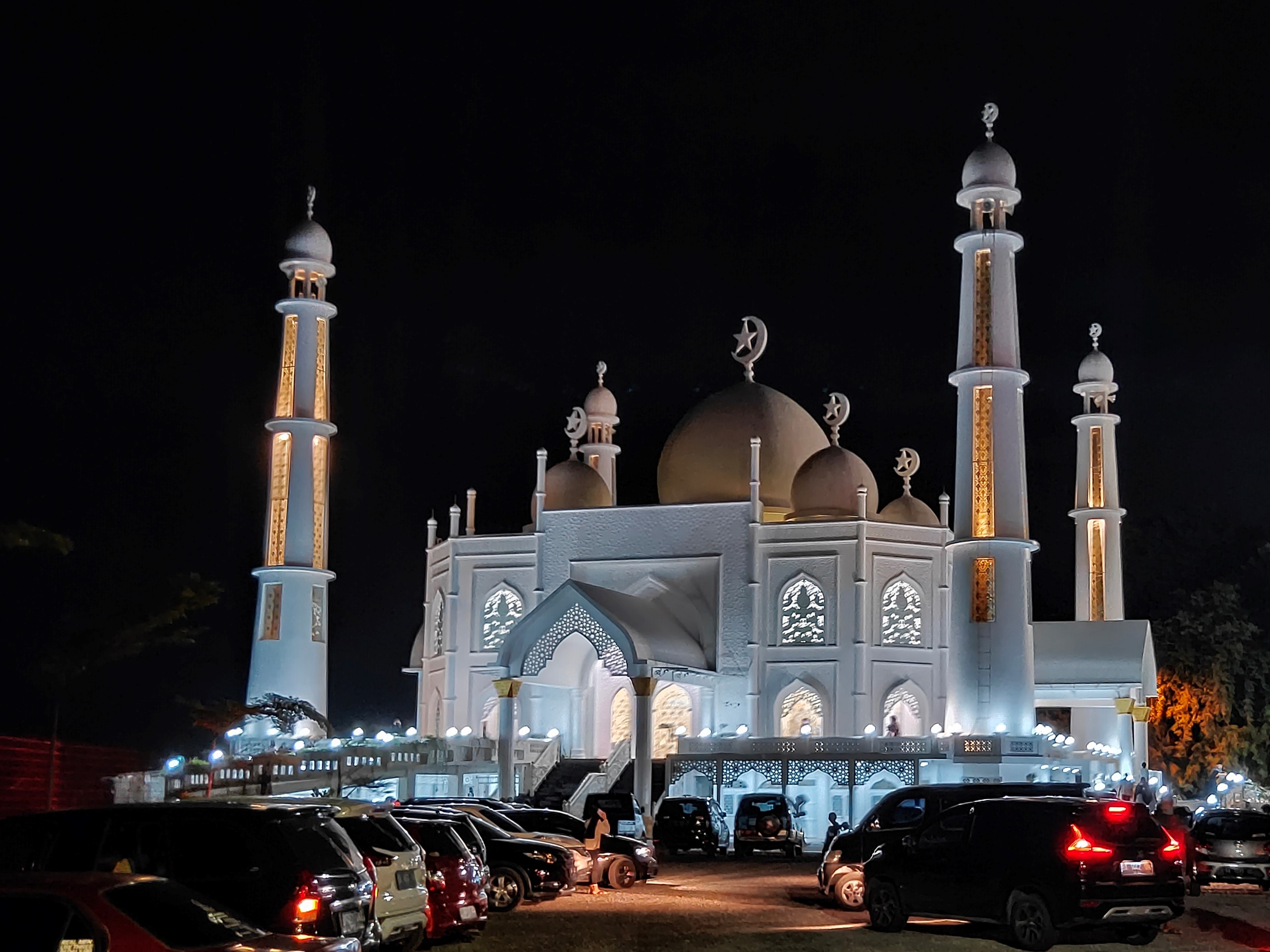
Al-Hakim Mosque, Padang

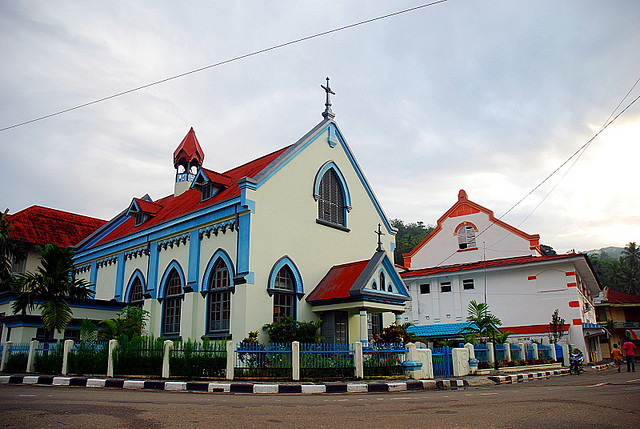
Saint Barbara Catholic church in Sawahlunto

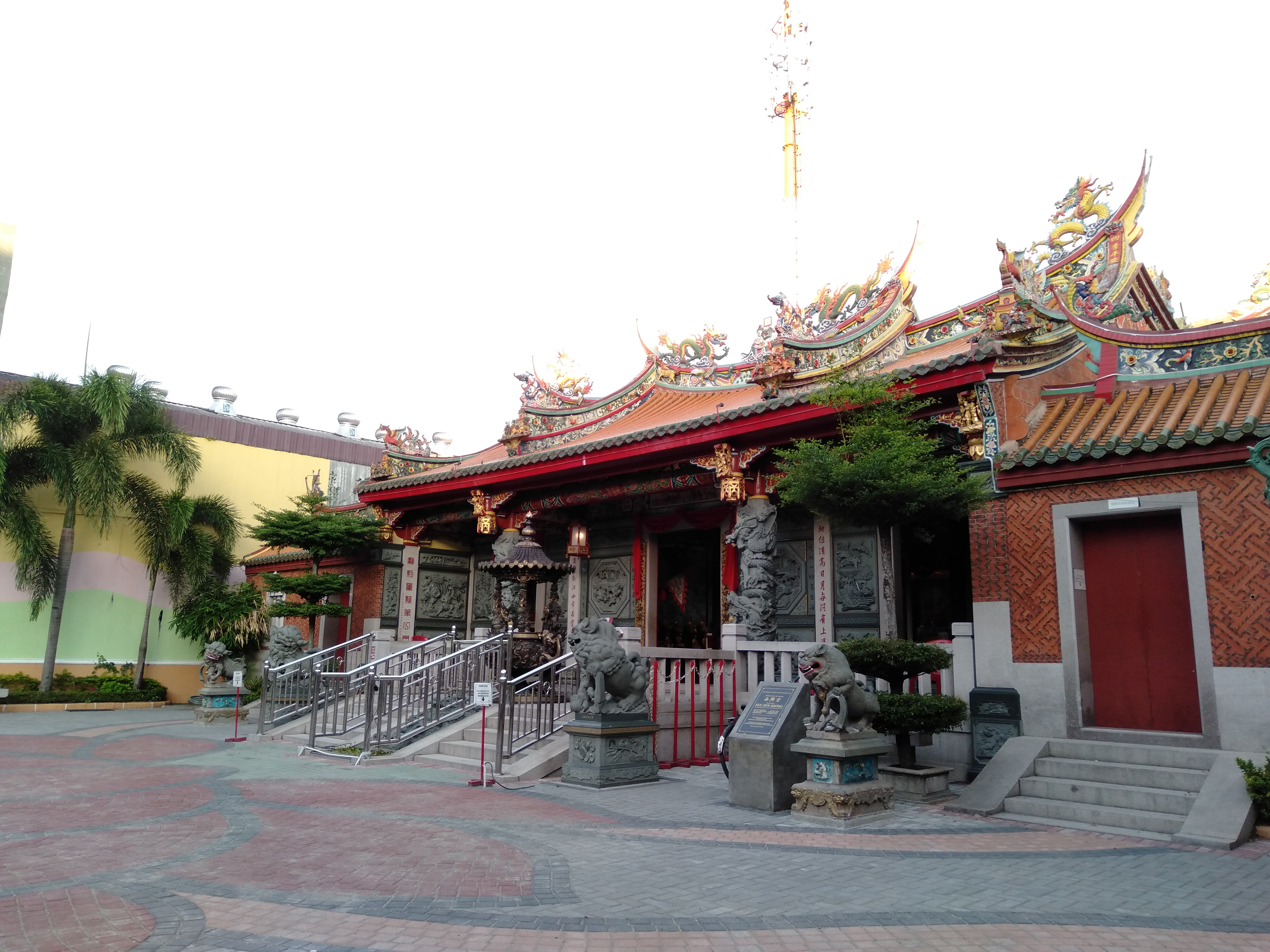
See Hin Kion Chinese temple, Padang

== Culture ==
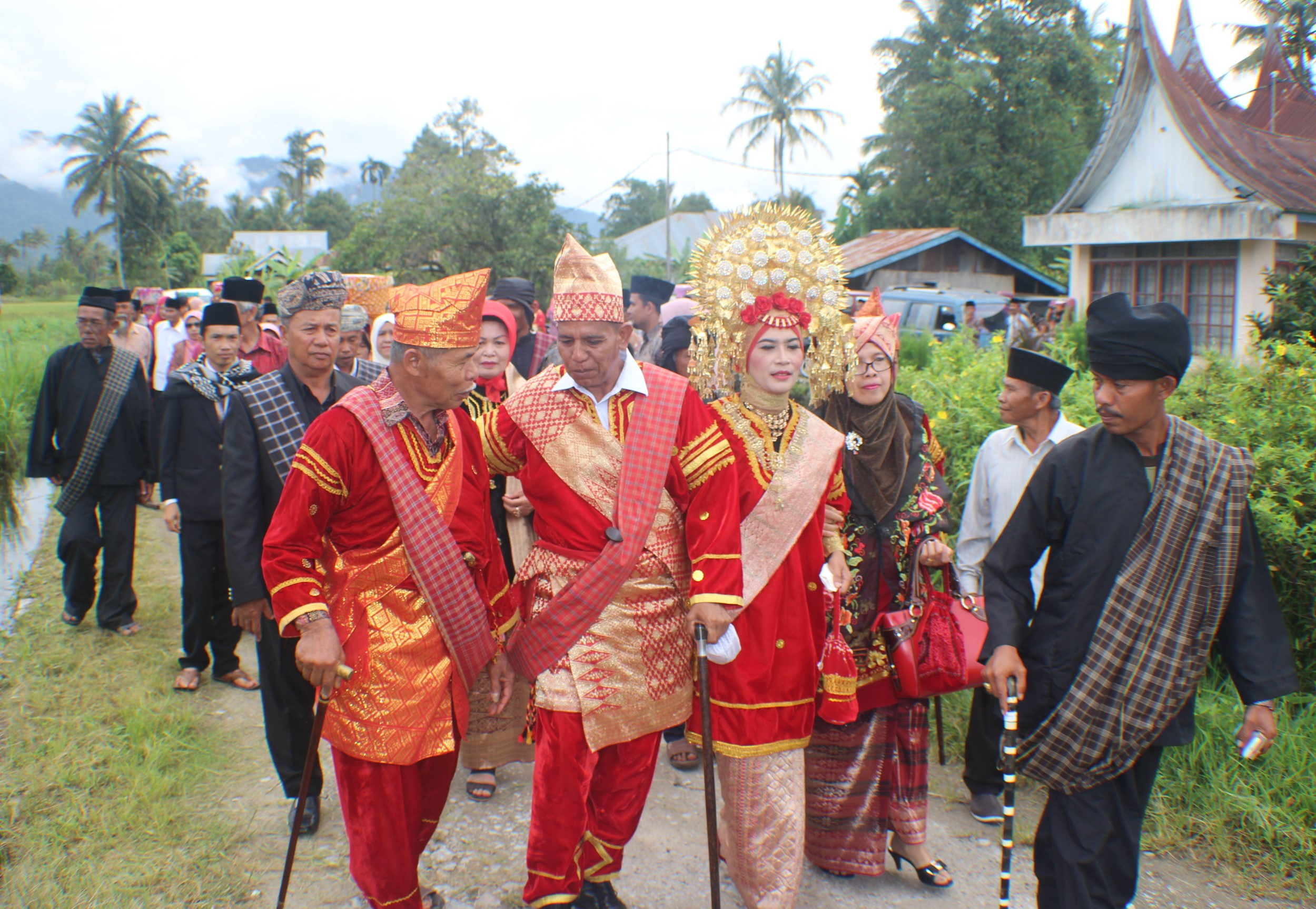
Two Datuks, Minangkabau tribal or village leader, are chatting among the preparation of cultural ceremony called Batagak Datuak or Batagak Penghulu (Inauguration of the Leader) in District of Kamang Magek, Agam, West Sumatra.

=== Traditional music ===
The nuances of Minangkabau in every West Sumatra music mixed with any type of music at this time will definitely be seen from every song that circulates in the community. This is because Minang music can be formulated with any kind of music that makes it pleasant to hear and acceptable to the public. The musical elements giving the nuance consist of traditional musical instruments, saluang, bansi, talempong, rabab, pupuik, serunai, and gandang tabuik.

There is also a saluang jo dendang, which is the delivery of chanting accompanied by saluang, also known as sijobang.

Minangkabau music in the form of instrumental and songs from this area are generally melancholy. This is closely related to the structure of the community which has a sense of brotherhood, kinship relations and love of a high homeland supported by the habit of going abroad.

The music industry in West Sumatra is growing with the emergence of Minangkabau artists who can blend modern music into traditional Minangkabau music. The development of modern Minang music in West Sumatra dates back to the 1950s, marked by the birth of the Gumarang Orchestra. Elly Kasim, Tiar Ramon and Nurseha are well-known West Sumatra singers in the 1970s to the present. At present the singers, songwriters and music stylists in West Sumatra are under the auspices of the PAPPRI organization (Association of Indonesian Singer Music Songwriters) and PARMI (Indonesian Minang Artist Association).

Record companies in West Sumatra that support the Minang music industry include: Tanama Record, Planet Record, Pitunang Record, Sinar Padang Record, Caroline Record located in Padang and Minang Record, Gita Virma Record located in Bukittinggi.

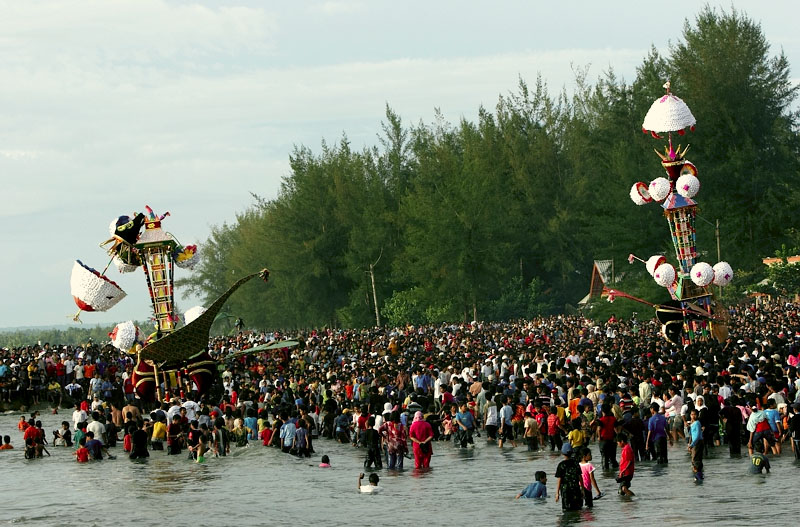
Photo of Tabuik festival

=== Traditional dance ===
Broadly speaking, dance from West Sumatra is from the customs of the Minangkabau people and the Mentawai people. The peculiarities of Minangkabau dance are generally influenced by the Islamic religion, the uniqueness of matrilineal customs and the habit of migrating their communities also give a great influence on the soul of a classical dance that is classic, including tari pasambah, Tari Piring, tari payung, and the tari indang. Meanwhile, there is also a performance typical of other Minangkabau ethnic groups in the form of a unique blend of martial arts called silek with dancing, singing and acting known as Randai.

As for the typical Mentawai people dance is called Turuk Laggai. This Turuk Langai dance generally tells about animal behavior, so the title is adjusted to the names of the animals, for example tari burung (bird), tari monyet (monkey), tari ayam (chicken), tari ular (snake) and so on.

=== Traditional house ===
Balai, council chamber, on Sumatra's west coast, dated c. 1895

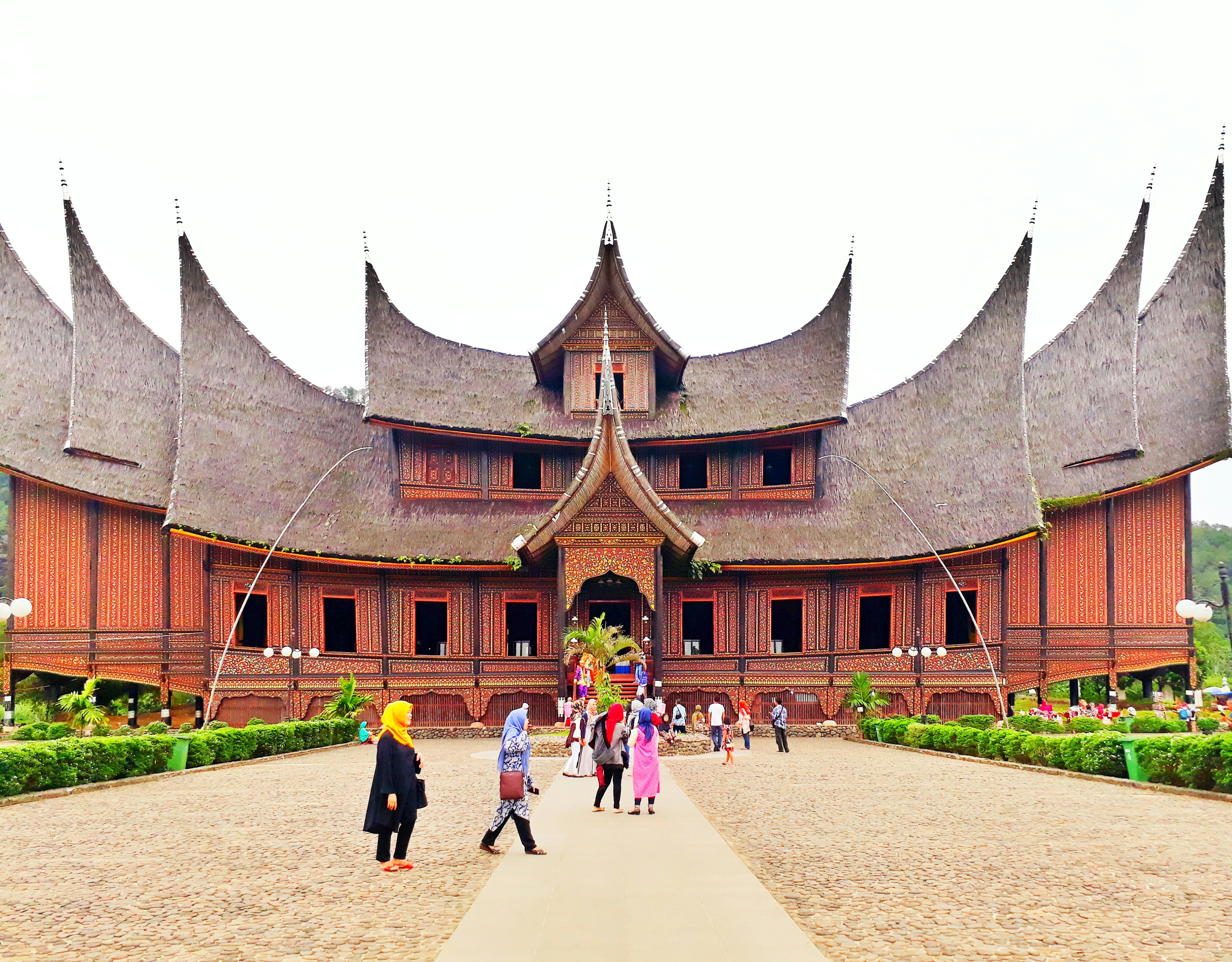
Pagaruyung Palace

The traditional house of West Sumatra, especially from the Minangkabau people, is called Rumah Gadang. The rumah Gadang is usually built on a plot of land belonging to the parent family in the tribe and people from generation to generation. Not far from the rumah gadang complex is usually also built a surau that functions as a place of worship and a place of residence for unmarried adult men. The rumah gadang is made in the form of a rectangle and is divided into two front and rear parts, generally made of wood, and at first glance it looks like a stilt house with a distinctive roof, prominent like a buffalo horn, the local people call it Gonjong and the roof was formerly made from palm fiber before changing to a zinc roof. This rumag Bagonjong according to the local community was inspired by theTambo, which tells of the arrival of their ancestors by boat from the sea. Another distinctive feature of this traditional house is not using iron nails but using wooden pegs, but strong enough as a binder.

While the Mentawai people also have a traditional house in the form of a large stilt house with a floor height of up to one meter of land called uma. Uma is inhabited jointly by five to ten families. In general, this uma construction was built without the use of nails, but it was cooked with wood and a cross-linking system.

=== Traditional weapon ===
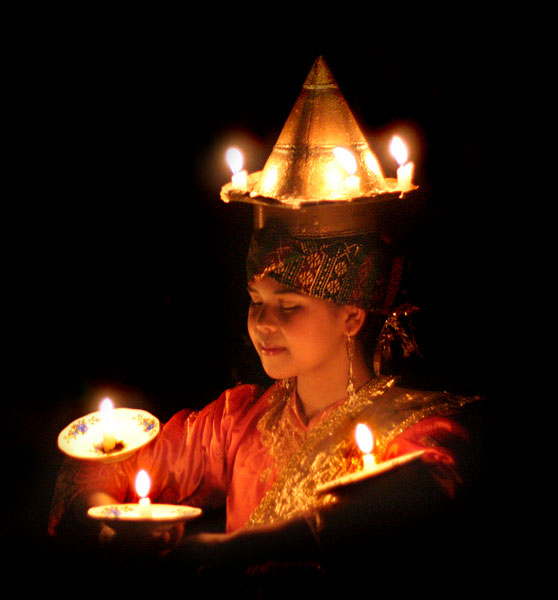
Tari Piring ("plate dance") from Minangkabau region of West Sumatra

Traditional, West Sumatra weapons are Keris and Kerambit shaped like tiger nails. Keris are usually used by men and placed on the front, and are generally used by the princes, especially in any official event, especially in the event of a gala or inaugural title, but it is also commonly used by the bridegroom in the community wedding ceremony the local called it baralek. While kerambit is a small sharp weapon that curves like a tiger's nails, because it is inspired by the hooves of the beast. This deadly weapon is used by Minang silat warriors in short-range battles which are usually secret weapons, especially those using tiger martial arts moves. Various other types of weapons have also been used such as spears, long swords, arrows, chopsticks and so on.

== Economy ==
Gradually, the economy of West Sumatra began to move positively after experiencing pressure due to the impact of the 2009 earthquake that hit the region. The impact of this disaster was seen in quarter IV-2009, where economic growth only reached 0.90%. But now the economy of West Sumatra has improved, with growth rates above the national average. In 2022 the West Sumatra economy grew by 4.36%, better than the previous year which was only 3.29%. The high economic growth of West Sumatra in the past three years has reduced poverty in the province from 6.28% (2020) to 5.92% (2022). For the Gross Regional Domestic Revenue (GRDP), in 2022 the province had a GRDP of Rp 285.4 trillion, with a GDP per capita of Rp 50.6 million.

=== Workforce ===
Along with the growth of the economy of West Sumatra, the number of workers needed is also increasing. This has led to a decline in unemployment rate in the province. Between February 2023 – February 2024, the number of unemployed people increased from 176,970 people to 178,840 people. The open Unemployment Rate declined from 5.90% to 5.79%. This figure is above the national average in February 2024 which reached 4.82%. In February 2024, the number of West Sumatra's workforce reached 3.09 million people, an increase of 86,780 people compared to the total workforce in February 2023.

Most of the population working is absorbed in the agricultural sector. Employment in this sector is able to absorb 29.27% of the existing workforce. However, this absorption percentage increase compared to the previous year which was 28.36%. Meanwhile, the percentage of working population absorbed in the trade sector again increased, from 19.83% in February 2023 to 22.81% in February 2024.

=== Agriculture ===
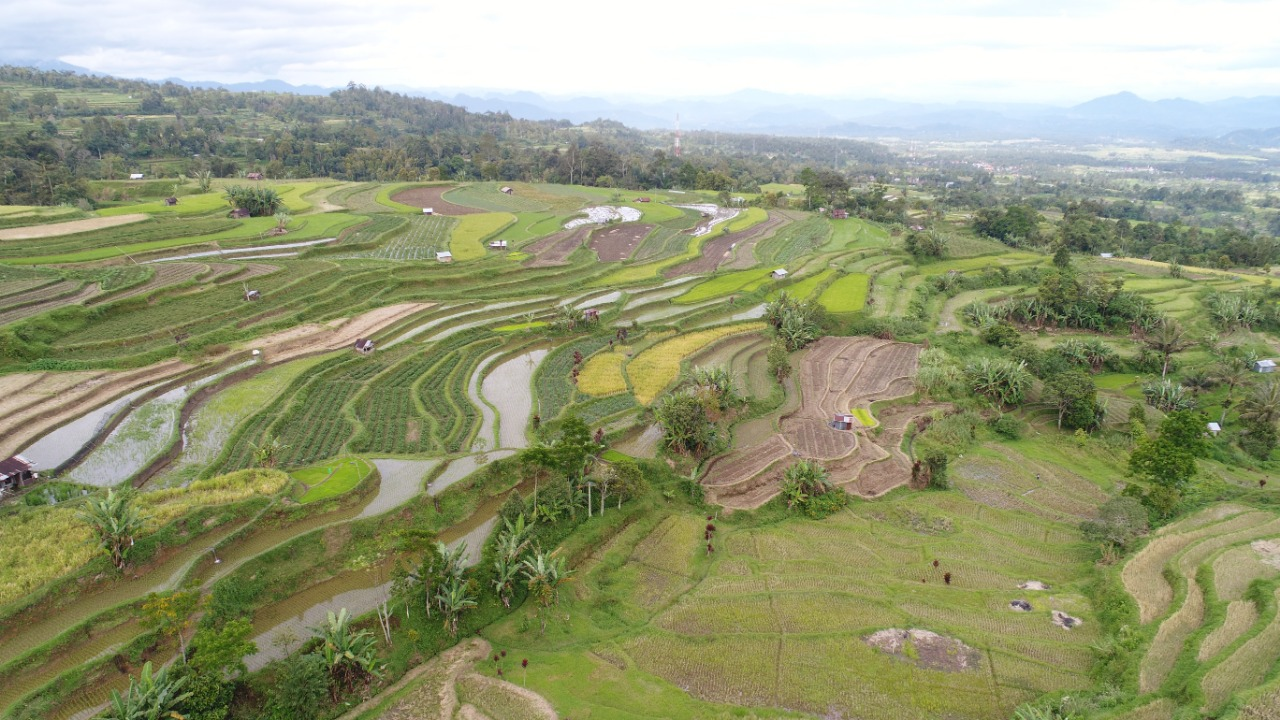
Rice fields in Pariangan, Agam Regency

In the fourth quarter of 2012, the agricultural sector experienced relatively high growth, driven by the stretching of the food crops subsector. In this quarter the growth of the agricultural sector reached 4.14%, higher than the previous quarter of 2.05%. The good performance of the plantation sector in 2012 has sustained the growth of the agricultural industry by 4.07%.

=== Processing industry ===
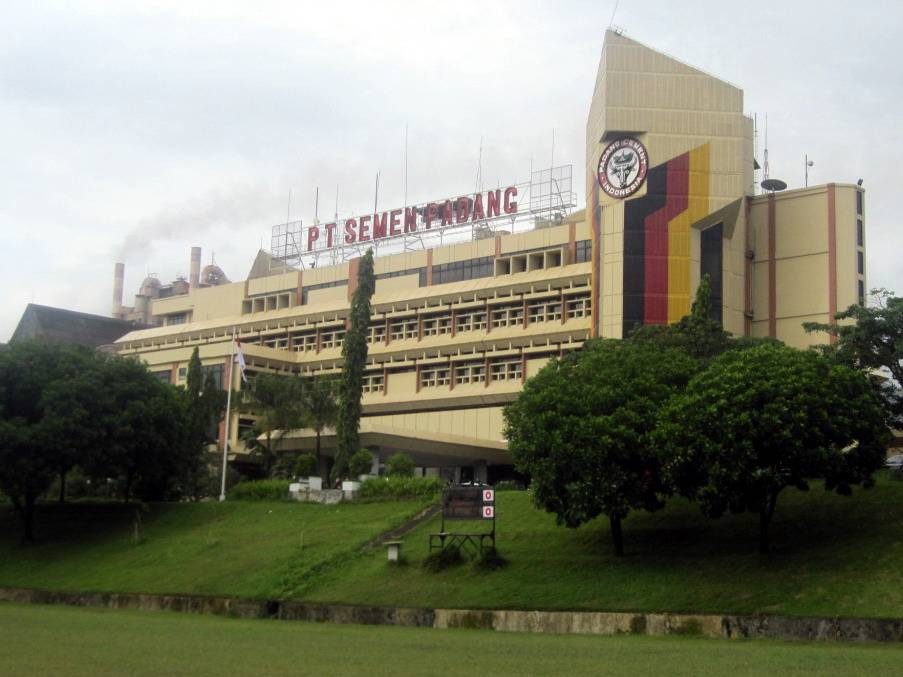
Semen Padang headquarter in Padang

The West Sumatra industry is dominated by small scale industries or households. The number of industrial units is 47,819 units, consisting of 47,585 small industrial units and 234 large medium industrial units, with a ratio of 203: 1. In 2001 large medium industry investment reached Rp 3,052 billion, or 95.60% of total investment, while small industries the investment is only Rp. 1,412 billion or 4.40% of the total investment. The value of the production of large medium industries in 2001 reached Rp. 1,623 billion, which is 60% of the total production value, and the value of small industrial production only reaches Rp. 1,090 billion, or 40% of the total value of production.

For the cement processing industry, in 2012 West Sumatra produced 6,522,006 tons, higher than last year's 6,151,636 tons. While the sales volume in 2012 was 6,845,070 tons, an increase of 10.20% compared to last year which was 6,211,603 tons.

=== Services ===
The return of the economy of West Sumatra in the aftermath of the earthquake and the recovery of the global economy, especially in the central Sumatra zone, was also a driving factor for the re-moving of the service sector (7.38%). The service sectors that are quite important in this province are finance, hotels, restaurants and travel agents. The growth of hotels in West Sumatra in the last three years has been quite rapid. This is in line with the increasing number of tourists who come to this province. During 2012 there were 36,623 foreign tourists visiting West Sumatra, an increase of 8.27% compared to last year which was 33,827 tourists.

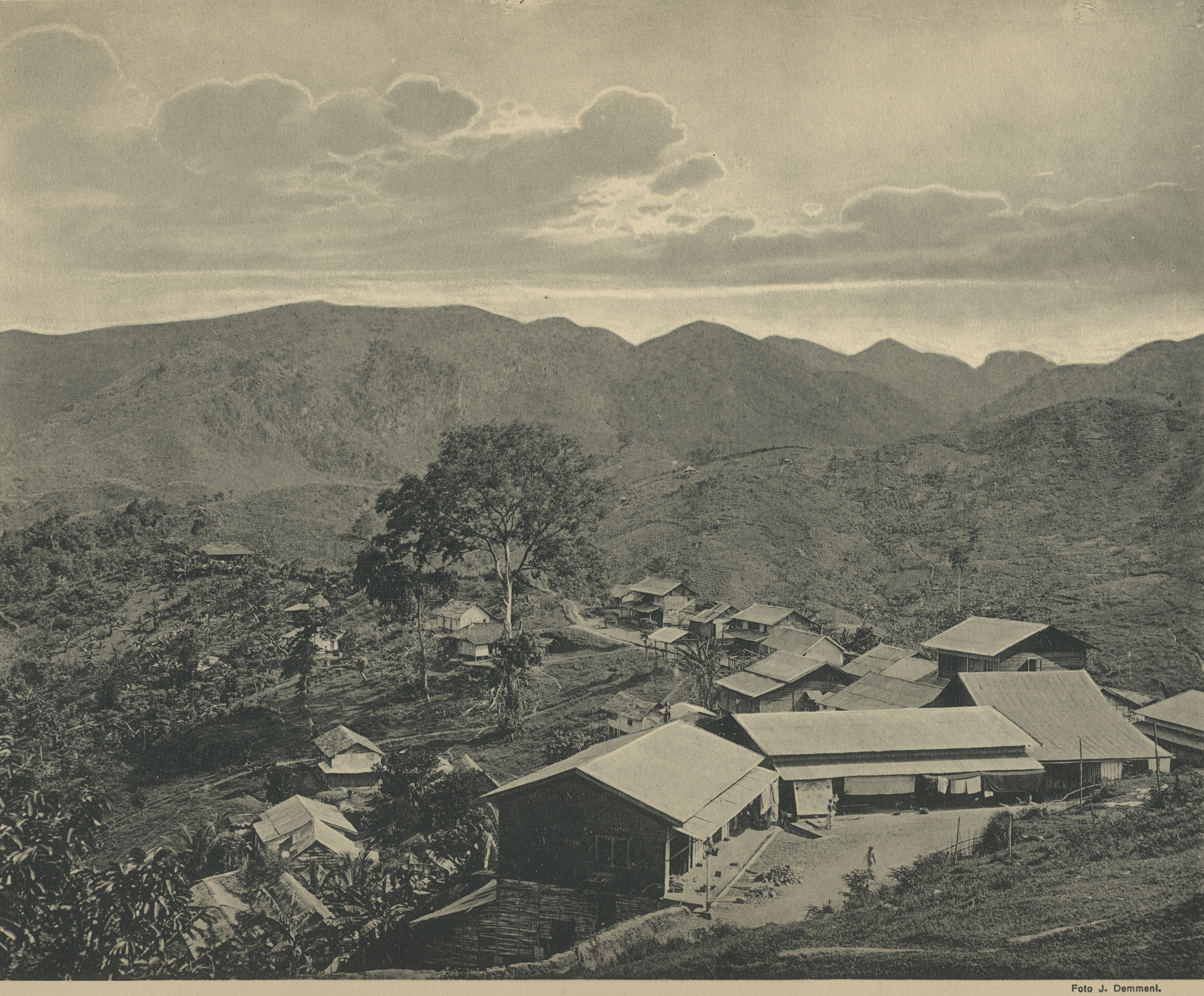
Coal mines in Ombilin, Sawahlunto

=== Mining ===
West Sumatra has the potential of group A, B and C mining materials. Group A mining materials, namely coal, are found in the city of Sawahlunto. While group B mining materials consisting of mercury, sulfur, iron sand, copper, lead and silver are spread in Sijunjung, Dharmasraya, Solok, South Solok, Limapuluh Koto, Pasaman, and Tanah Datar Regencies. Group C mining materials spread throughout all districts and cities, mostly consisting of sand, stone and gravel.

=== Banking ===
The development of various banking indicators in the fourth quarter of 2012 showed improvement in line with the recovery in the post-earthquake economic conditions. In 2012, the total assets of commercial banks in the province reached Rp. 40.1 trillion with the value of lending by commercial banks amounting to Rp. 33.8 trillion. While the total assets of rural banks in the province reached Rp 1.53 trillion with the value of lending by the bank amounting to Rp 1.03 trillion.

== Transport ==
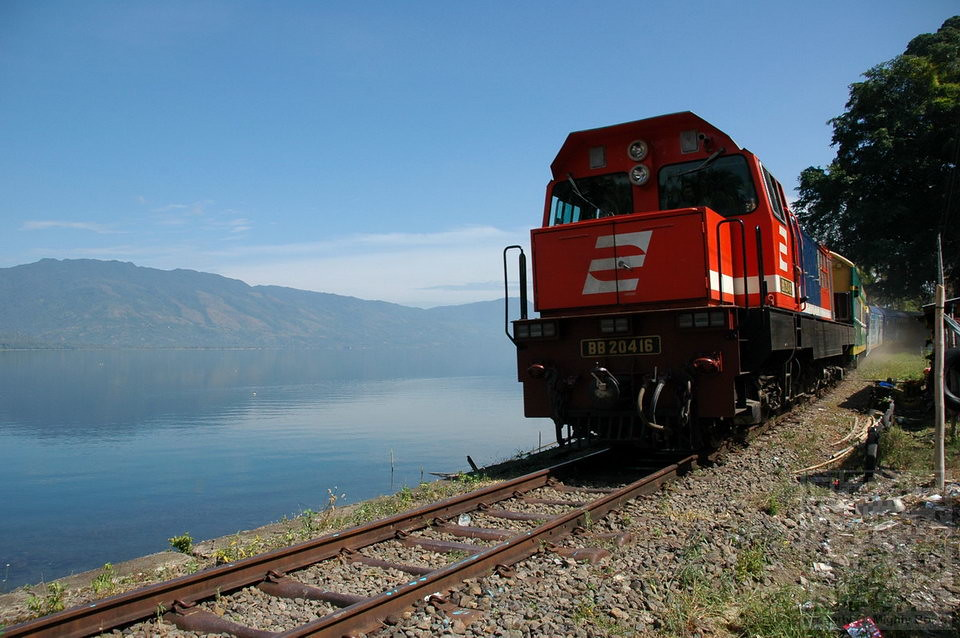
A train passes Lake Singkarak.

The province is served by Minangkabau International Airport, opened in July 2005, 23 km north-west of Padang in Ketaping, Padang Pariaman regency. The airport has direct international services to Kuala Lumpur in Malaysia, as well as servicing most large cities in Indonesia.

Significant roads include the Trans-Sumatran Highway which runs the length of the province, heading north-west towards Medan and south-east towards Jakarta, the road between Padang and Bukittinggi, and the road between Bukittinggi and Pekanbaru. The provincial government plans to upgrade the later two roads over the next few years to improve traffic flows.

In January 2012, the Kelok Sembilan 970-meter long overpass was ready to be opened to the public and was in the trial stage which will be opened for vehicles in April 2012. Kelok Sembilan means 9 sharp turns is an area through which a road with tight bends passes through hilly terrain in the middle of a valley, a nice scenery, but cause congestion. After the overpass opens, the old Kelok Sembilan road is still open together with the new Kelok Sembilan for tourists.

Regular bus services run between Padang and Bukittinggi, and the other major cities of Sumatra. Other public transport options within the province include train, oplet, taxi and horse cart (bendi).

Teluk Bayur port in Padang is the largest and busiest on the western coast of Sumatra. It is used for exporting goods from West Sumatra as well as from some areas of the neighboring provinces.

Train services operate between Padang and Pariaman with round trips four times daily and airport rail link serves routes to Padang and Kayutanam.

== Tourism ==
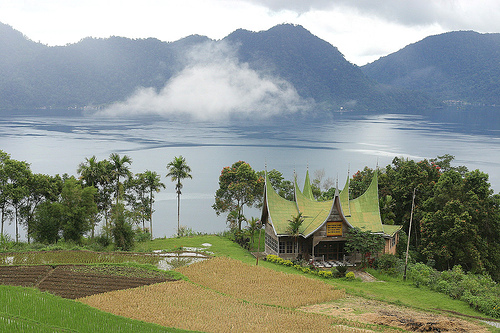
Lake Maninjau

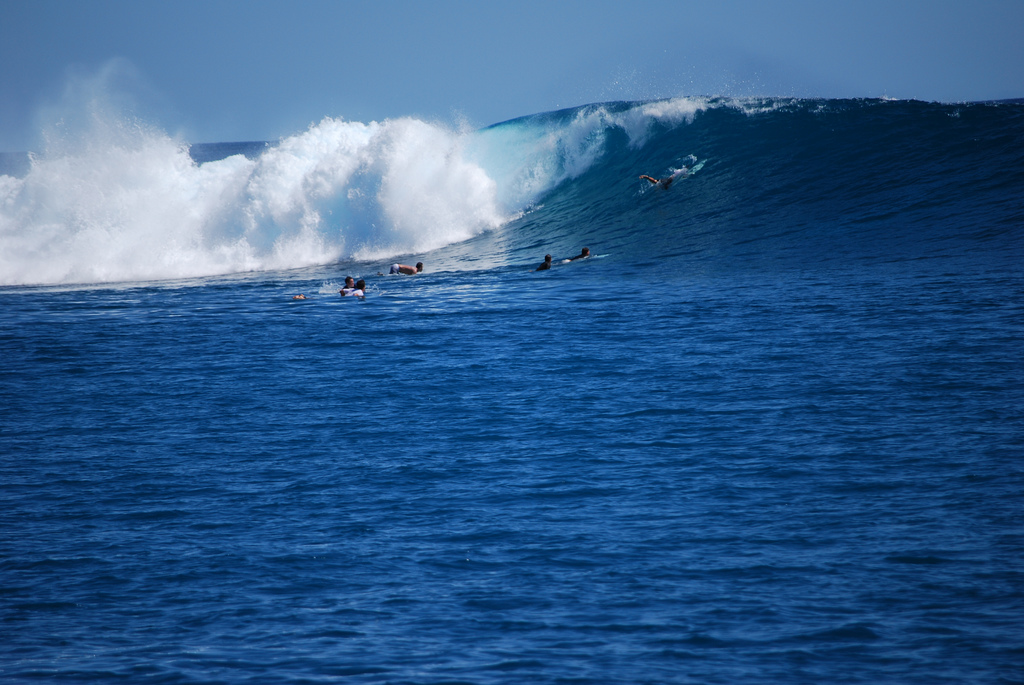
Surfers explore the Mentawai islands, West Sumatra

The prime tourist attractions of West Sumatra are the natural environment, and the culture and history of the Minangkabau and Mentawai people.

Natural attractions of the mainland include the tropical forests, mountains, volcanos, lakes, valleys, rivers & waterfalls in the highlands, the fauna and flora, and the beaches around Padang. Many areas are protected as part of national parks and reserves. The city of Bukittinggi is a popular central location in the highlands from which to explore the culture and history of the Minangkabau people, including architecture, crafts, dances, music and food. There are a number of museums and cultural centers. Pariaman has one of the famous festivals, Tabuik. The Mentawai Islands are a popular destination for surfers and those looking to experience the culture and more primitive lifestyle of the Mentawai people. For developing West Sumatra tourism, in 2006 the government opened tourist train railway service run between Padang – Padang Panjang – Sawahlunto. The Tour de Singkarak international cycling race had boosted the number of the foreign tourists to West Sumatra. The majority of the foreign tourists are Malaysians and Australian.

The favourite tourism places are :

- Jam Gadang – the clocktower in the downtown of Bukittinggi
- Panorama – Viewing to Sianok valley
- Air Manih beach – The beach that stretch from the north to south of Padang coastal
- Padang mountain
- Caroline beach
- Pagaruyung Palace in Batusangkar
- Harau valley
- Lake Maninjau
- Lake Singkarak
- Lake Diatas and Lake Dibawah
- Sikuai Island

There are 25 islands at Pesisir Selatan Regency potential to be tourist sites. Cubadak Island (9 hectares), Pagang Island (12 hectares) and Pulau Penyu (Turtle Island) have been developed well. At the northern part will be developed Semangki Besar Island, Semangki Kecil Island, Marak Island, Setan Terusan Island, and Karao Island. At the southern part will be developed Kerabak Ketek Island, Kerabak Gadang Island, and Kosong Island.

The traditional dance is "Tari Piring" or Plate Dance which is originally came from Solok, West Sumatra.

== Education ==
Education is highly valued in the Minangkabau culture, therefore West Sumatra was once a center of education on the island of Sumatra, especially in the education of Islam by mosque as the main base place. During the colonial rule Islamic schools of education are so marginalized in comparison with the Dutch East Indies model which is considered more modern. Since Islamic scholars sponsored many village schools, West Sumatra had one of the highest literacy rates in Indonesia.

West Sumatra is home to several universities, the most notable of which is Andalas University. It is the oldest university in Indonesia outside Java.

== Sport ==
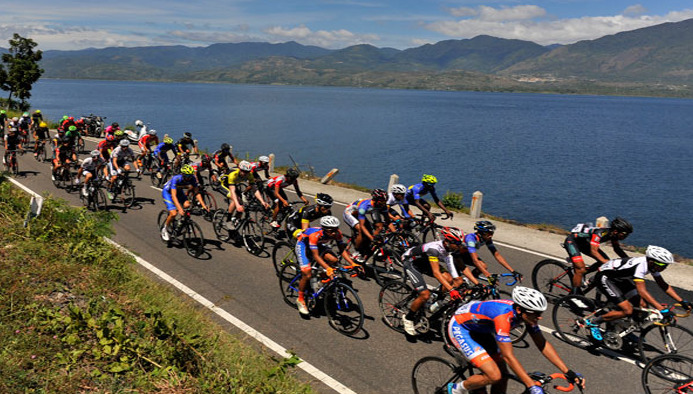
Participants of the Tour de Singkarak passing over Lake Singkarak

West Sumatra is also home of several professional soccer clubs. The most popular of them is Semen Padang, which regularly plays its matches in Haji Agus Salim Stadium, the biggest stadium in West Sumatra. After 1 season of an impressive season, in 2024 Semen Padang FC returned to compete in BRI Liga 1 (Indonesia's premier league).

Tour de Singkarak, an annual road cycling race since 2009 is an official tournament series of Union Cycliste International (UCI). It covers more than 700 kilometers, from Padang passing around lake Singkarak and runs through inland West Sumatran cities. This sporting event is also meant to promote West Sumatra tourism

== Cuisine ==
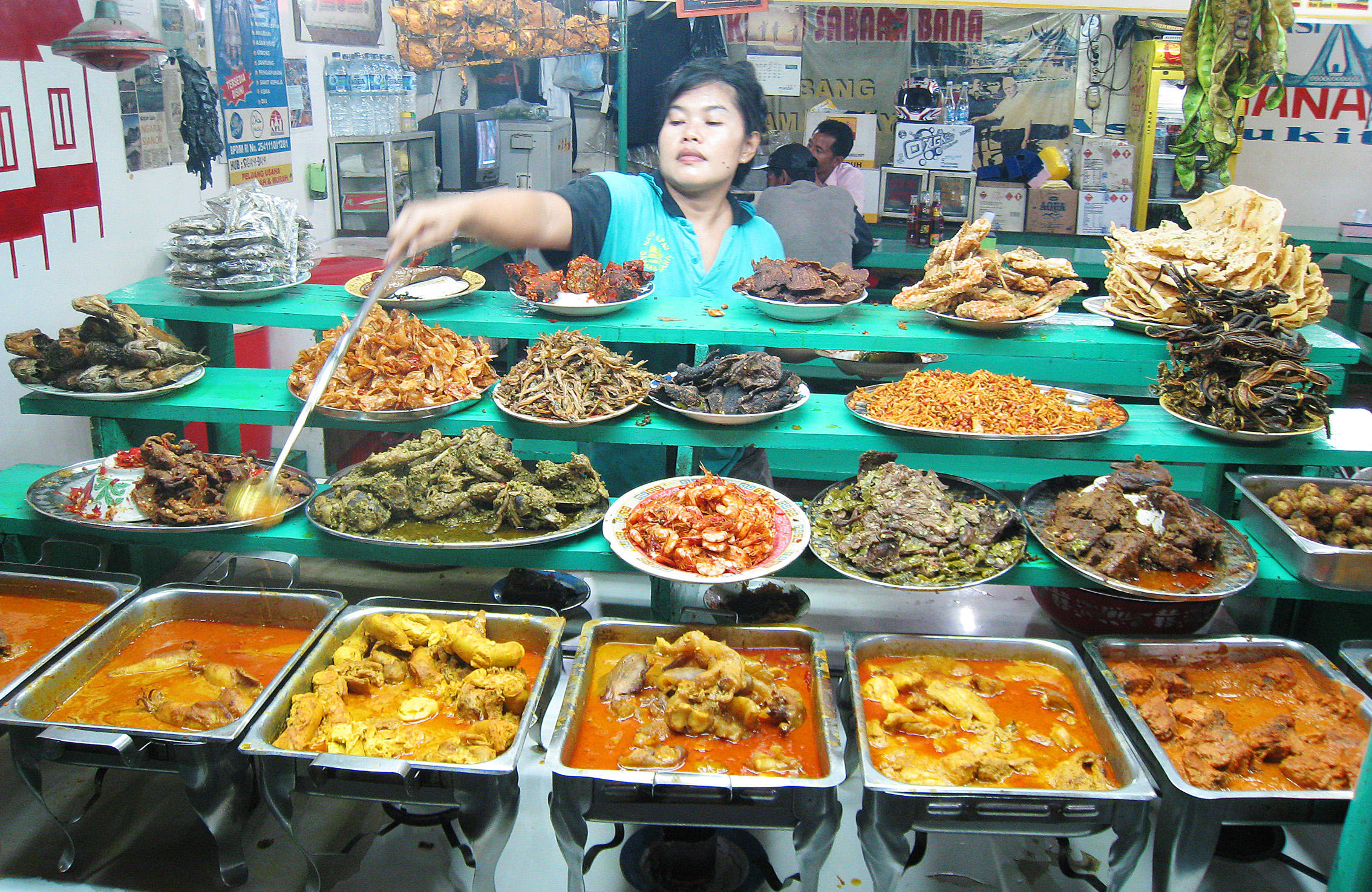
An array of Nasi kapau dishes, Minangkabau Bukittinggi cuisine.

Padang food is the cuisine of the Minangkabau people. Padang food is famous for its rich taste of succulent coconut milk and spicy chili. Minang cuisine put much emphasis in three elements; gulai (curry), lado (chili pepper) and bareh (rice). No traditional Padang meal is complete without the three—spicy chili sauce, thick curry, and perfect steamed rice. Among the cooking traditions in Indonesian cuisine, Minangkabau cuisine and most of Sumatran cuisine, demonstrate Indian and Middle Eastern influences, with dishes cooked in curry sauce with coconut milk and the heavy use of spices mixture.

Because most Minangkabau people are Muslims, Minangkabau cuisine follows halal dietary law rigorously. Protein intake are mostly taken from beef, water buffalo, goat, lamb meat, and poultry and fish. Minangkabau people are known for their fondness of cattle meat products including offal. Almost all the parts of a cattle, such as meat, ribs, tongue, tail, liver, tripe, brain, bone marrow, spleen, intestine, cartilage, tendon, and skin are made to be Minangkabau delicacies. Seafood is popular in coastal West Sumatran cities, and most are grilled or fried with spicy chili sauce or in curry gravy. Fish, shrimp, and cuttlefish are cooked in similar fashion. Most of Minangkabau food is eaten with hot steamed rice or compressed rice such as katupek (ketupat). Vegetables are mostly boiled such as boiled cassava leaf, or simmered in thin curry as side dishes, such as gulai of young jackfruit or cabbages.

In Padang food establishments, it is common to eat with one's hands. They usually provide kabasuah, a bowl of tap water with a slice of lime in it to give a fresh scent. This water is used to wash one's hands before and after eating. If a customer does not wish to eat with bare hands, it is acceptable to ask for a spoon and fork.

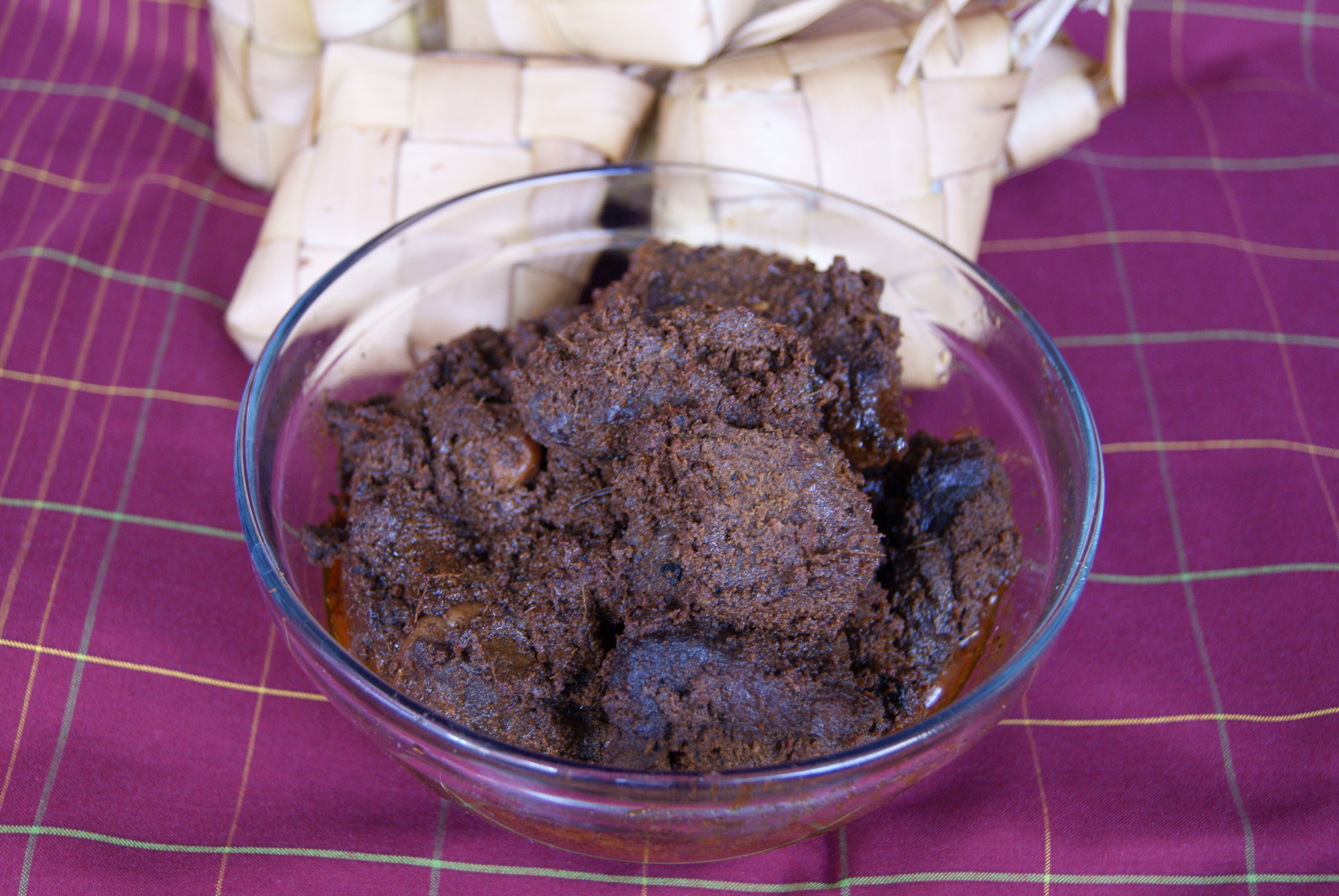
Authentic Minangkabau rendang is dark in colour, served with ketupat

The cuisine is usually cooked once per day. To have Nasi Padang in restaurants customers choose from those dishes, which are left on display in high-stacked plates in the windows. During a dine-in hidang (serve) style Padang restaurant, after the customers are seated, they do not have to order. The waiter immediately serves the dishes directly to the table, and the table will quickly be set with dozens of small dishes filled with highly flavored foods such as beef rendang, curried fish, stewed greens, chili eggplant, curried beef liver, tripe, intestines, or foot tendons, fried beef lung, fried chicken, and of course, sambal, the spicy sauces ubiquitous at Indonesian tables. Customers take—and pay for—only what they want from this array. The best known Padang dish is rendang, a spicy meat stew. Soto Padang (crispy beef in spicy soup) is local residents' breakfast favorite, meanwhile sate (beef satay in curry sauce served with ketupat) is a treat in the evening.

The serving style is different in Nasi Kapau food stalls, a Minangkabau Bukittinggi style. After the customer is seated, he or she is asked which dishes they desire. The chosen dishes will be put directly upon the steamed rice or in separate small plates.

There are myriad Padang food establishments throughout Indonesia and the region, according to Ikatan Warung Padang Indonesia (Iwapin) or Warung Padang Bonds. In Greater Jakarta alone there are at least 20,000 Padang restaurant establishments. Several notable Minangkabau restaurant chains are Sederhana, Garuda, Pagi Sore, Simpang Raya, Sari Ratu, Sari Minang, Payakumbuah and Natrabu.

The importance of Padang food establishments (warung or rumah makan Padang) for Indonesian workers' lunch break in urban areas, was demonstrated in 2016; when Jakarta municipal civil servants demanded the raise of uang lauk pauk (food allowance, as a component of civil servant's salary), following the raise of Nasi Padang price in Greater Jakarta area.

== Media and information ==
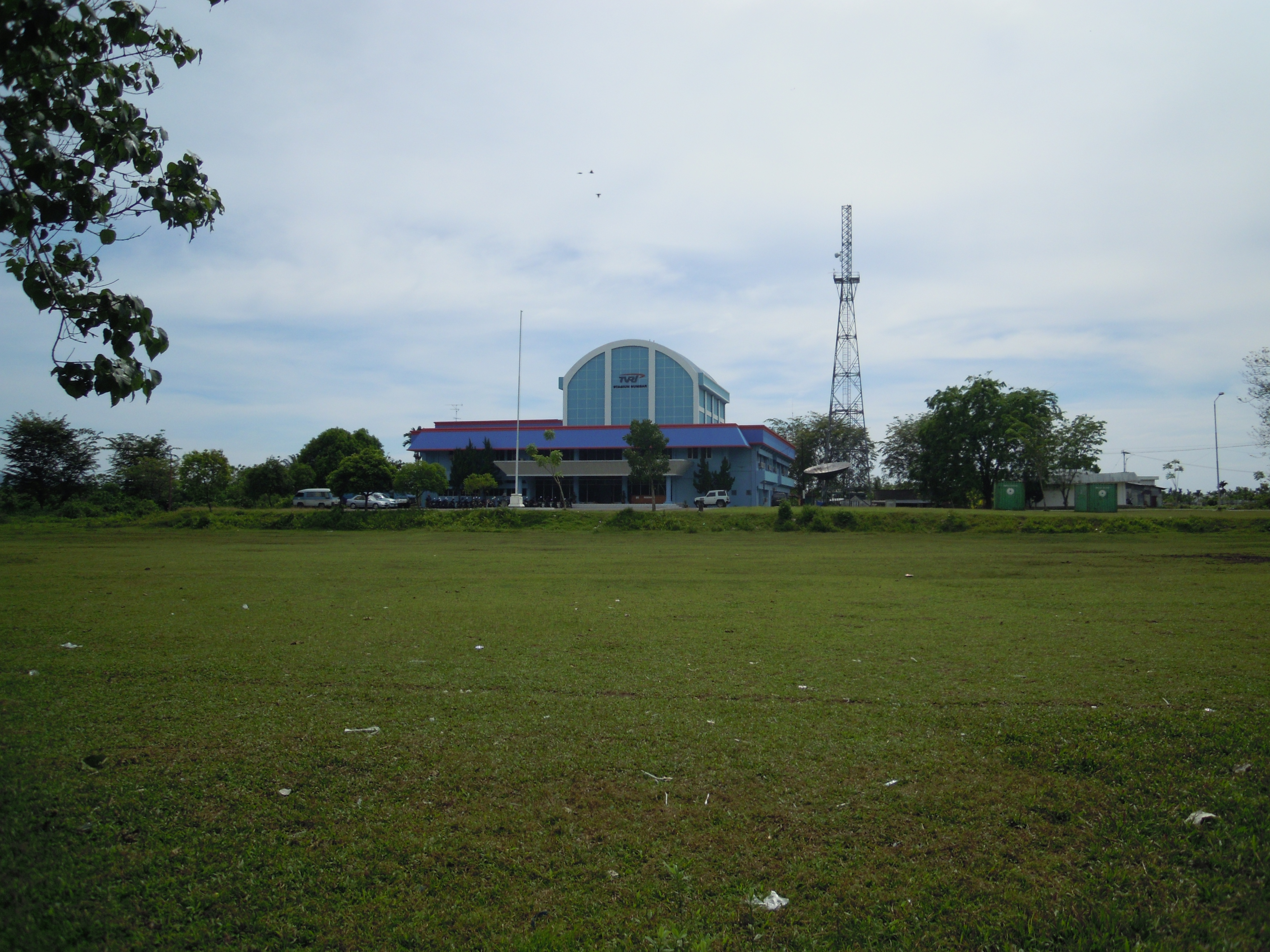
TVRI Sumatra Barat

Almost all national television channels can now reach the West Sumatra region. In addition, the province also has several local television stations, such as TVRI Sumatera Barat, Padang TV, Minang TV, TV E, Favorit TV, and Bukittinggi Televisi (BiTV).

In almost every regency and city in the province, there are radio transmitters owned not only by the government but also by private companies, such as RRI Padang, Classy FM, Jelita FM, SK FM, Fanesa 5 FM, Arif FM, and Harau FM.

West Sumatra currently also has many print media outlets, particularly newspapers, including Padang Ekspres, Harian Haluan, Singgalang Daily, POSMETRO Padang, Metro Andalas (Metrans), Rakyat Sumbar, and Koran Padang. There are also several weekly print media such as Tabloid Indonesia Raya, Binnews, and Bakinews. These print media are also available and accessible online via the internet.

Originally, Sumatra Courant was the first newspaper published in West Sumatra by the Dutch East Indies government in 1862. Later, in 1877, the privately-owned Padangsche Handelsblad began publication. Both newspapers used Dutch, and only in 1890 did the monthly newspaper Pelita Kecil appear, using Malay.

A survey by the Indonesian Internet Service Providers Association (Asosisasi Penyedia Jasa Internet Indonesia, APJII) in 2020 recorded that West Sumatra was the province with the highest percentage of internet users in Sumatra. Internet users numbered 5,008,263 people, or 91.4% of the population.

== See also ==
- List of people from West Sumatra
- List of governors of West Sumatra
- List of rivers of West Sumatra
- Minangkabau businesspeople
