= 2024 Padang mayoral election =

- 27 November 2024
- Turnout: 49.11%
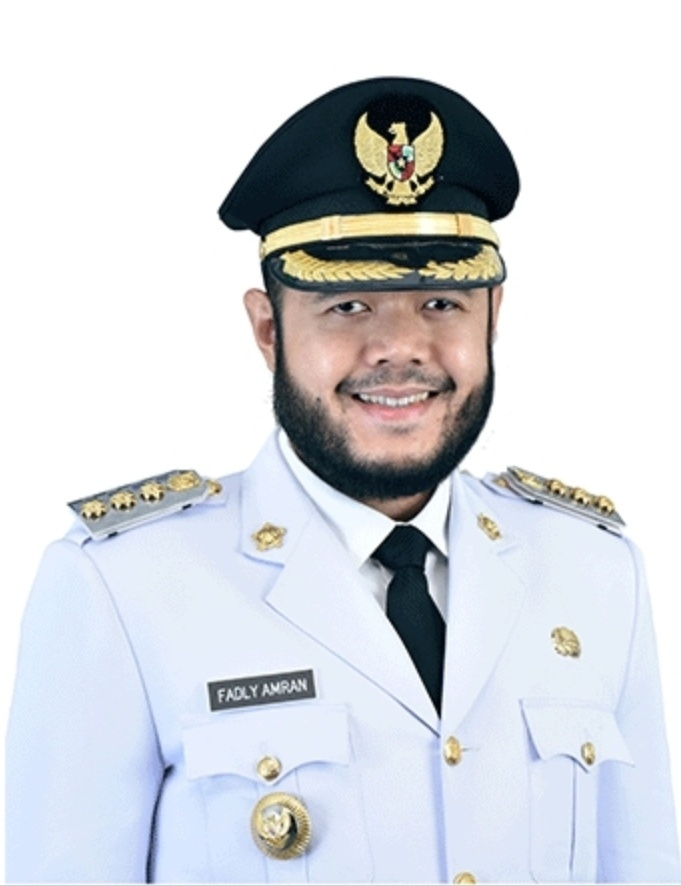

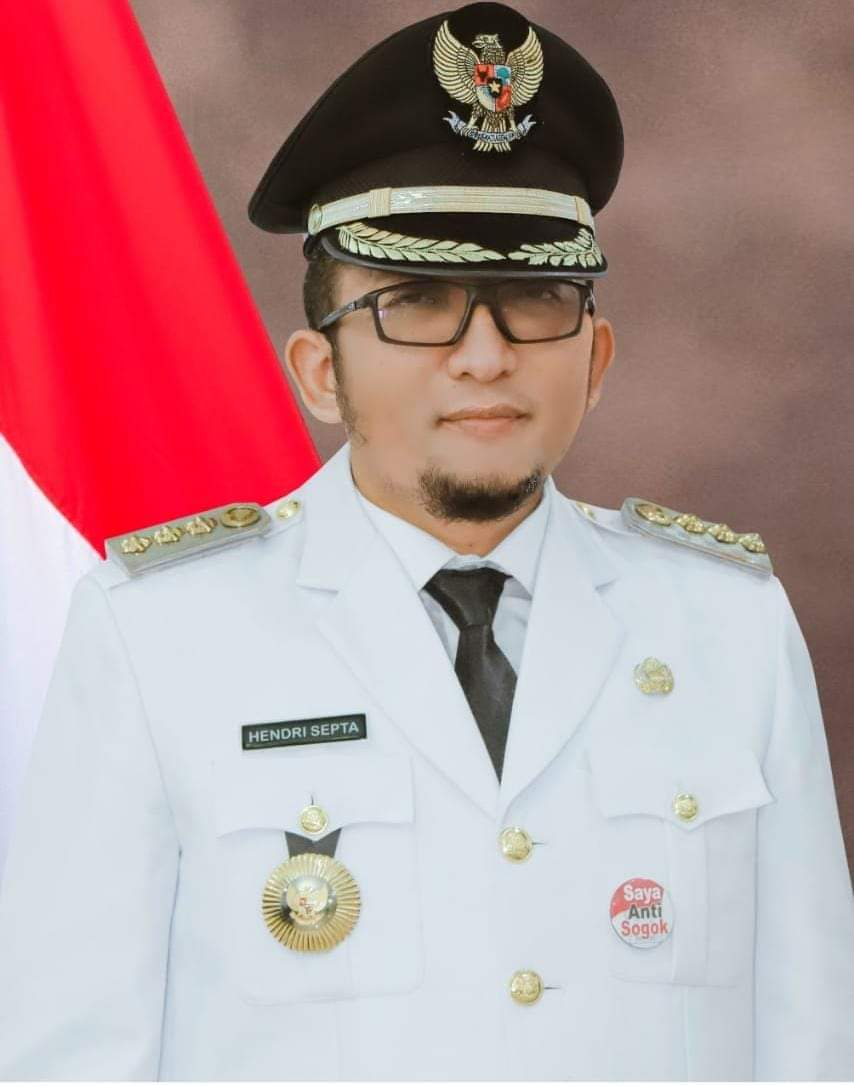

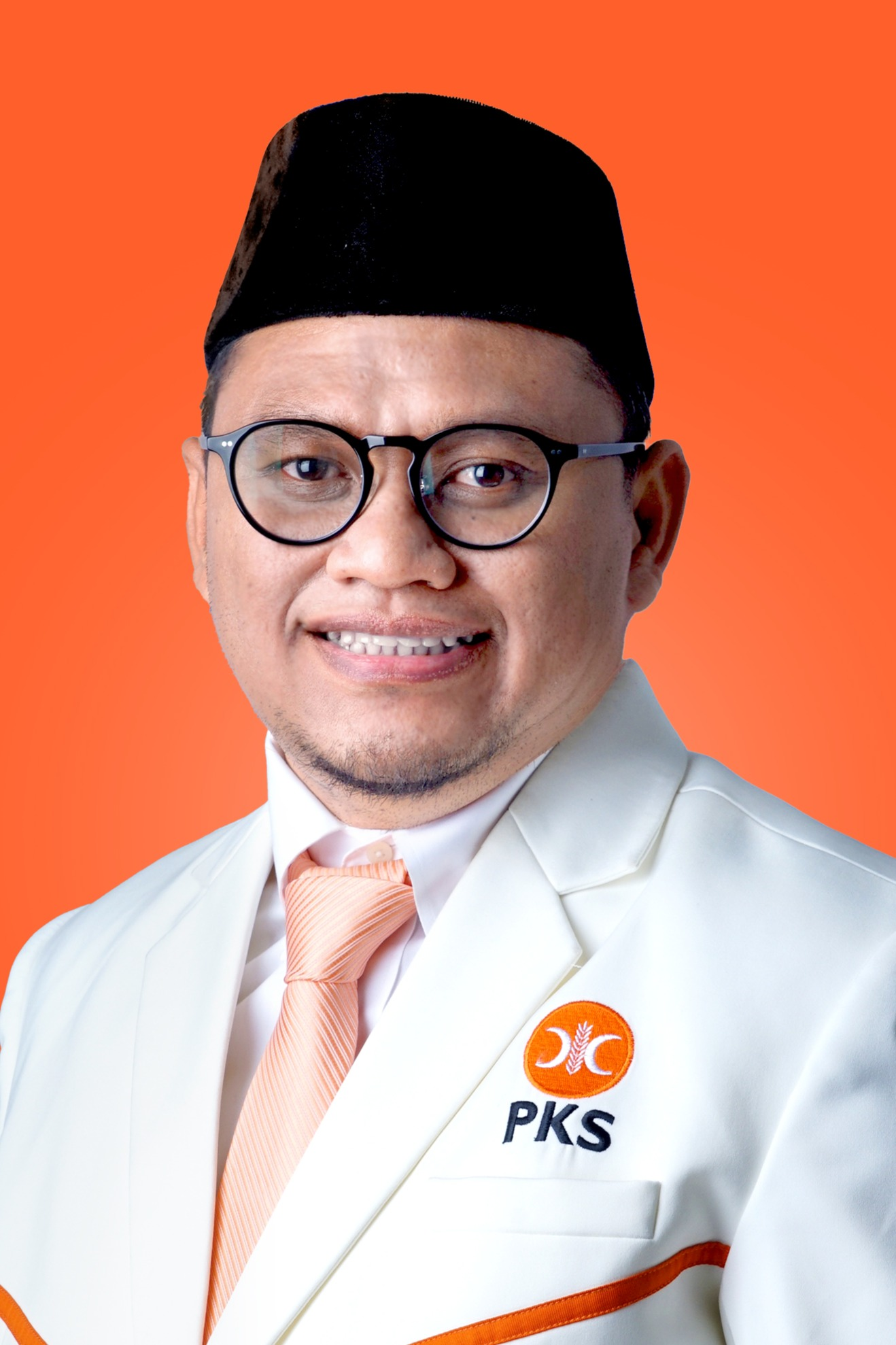
Candidate	Fadly Amran	Hendri Septa	Muhammad Iqbal
Party	NasDem	PAN	PKS
Running mate	Maigus Nasir	Hidayat	Amasrul
Popular vote	176,648	88,859	54,685
Percentage	55.17%	27.75%	17.08%
- Results by district and subdistrict (Interactive version)
Mayor before election
Andree Algamar (acting)
Independent
Elected mayor
Fadly Amran
NasDem

The 2024 Padang mayoral election was held on 27 November 2024 as part of nationwide local elections to elect the mayor and vice mayor of Padang, West Sumatra for a five-year term. The previous election was held in 2018. Former Padang Panjang Mayor Fadly Amran of the NasDem Party won the election with 55% of the vote. He defeated former Mayor Hendri Septa of the National Mandate Party (PAN), who received 27%. Muhammad Iqbal of the Prosperous Justice Party (PKS) placed third with 17%.

== Electoral system ==
The election, like other local elections in 2024, follow the first-past-the-post system where the candidate with the most votes wins the election, even if they do not win a majority. It is possible for a candidate to run uncontested, in which case the candidate is still required to win a majority of votes "against" an "empty box" option. Should the candidate fail to do so, the election will be repeated on a later date.

== Candidates ==
According to electoral regulations, in order to qualify for the election, candidates were required to secure support from a political party or a coalition of parties controlling 9 seats (20 percent of all seats) in the Padang Regional House of Representatives (DPRD). As no parties won 9 or more seats in the 2024 legislative election, parties are required to form coalitions to nominate a candidate. Candidates may alternatively demonstrate support to run as an independent in form of photocopies of identity cards, which in Padang's case corresponds to 49,964 copies. No independent candidates registered with the General Elections Commission (KPU) prior to the set deadline.

=== Potential ===
The following are individuals who have either been publicly mentioned as a potential candidate by a political party in the DPRD, publicly declared their candidacy with press coverage, or considered as a potential candidate by media outlets:

- Hendri Septa (PAN), former mayor.
- Ekos Albar (PAN), former vice mayor.
- Fadly Amran (NasDem), former mayor of Padang Panjang (2018–2023) and chairman of Nasdem's West Sumatra branch.
- Hidayat (Gerindra), member of West Sumatra Regional House of Representatives.
- Alkudri, real estate developer.
- Braditi Moulevey, businessman.

== Political map ==
Following the 2024 Indonesian legislative election, ten political parties are represented in the Padang DPRD:

Political parties	Seat count
Great Indonesia Movement Party (Gerindra)	7 / 45
NasDem Party	7 / 45
Prosperous Justice Party (PKS)	7 / 45
Party of Functional Groups (Golkar)	5 / 45
National Mandate Party (PAN)	5 / 45
National Awakening Party (PKB)	4 / 45
Democratic Party (Demokrat)	4 / 45
Indonesian Democratic Party of Struggle (PDI-P)	3 / 45
United Development Party (PPP)	2 / 45
Ummah Party	1 / 45

== Results ==
Candidate	Running mate	Party	Votes	%
Fadly Amran	Maigus Nasir	NasDem Party	176,648	55.17
Hendri Septa	Hidayat	National Mandate Party	88,859	27.75
Muhammad Iqbal	Amasrul	Prosperous Justice Party	54,685	17.08
Total			320,192	100.00
Valid votes			320,192	98.03
Invalid/blank votes			6,440	1.97
Total votes			326,632	100.00
Registered voters/turnout			665,126	49.11
Source: KPU

Candidate vote share by district and subdistrict
Fadly–Maigus

Iqbal–Amasrul

Hendri–Hidayat
