= Abdoel Hakim =

Indonesian politician

Dr. Abdoel Hakim
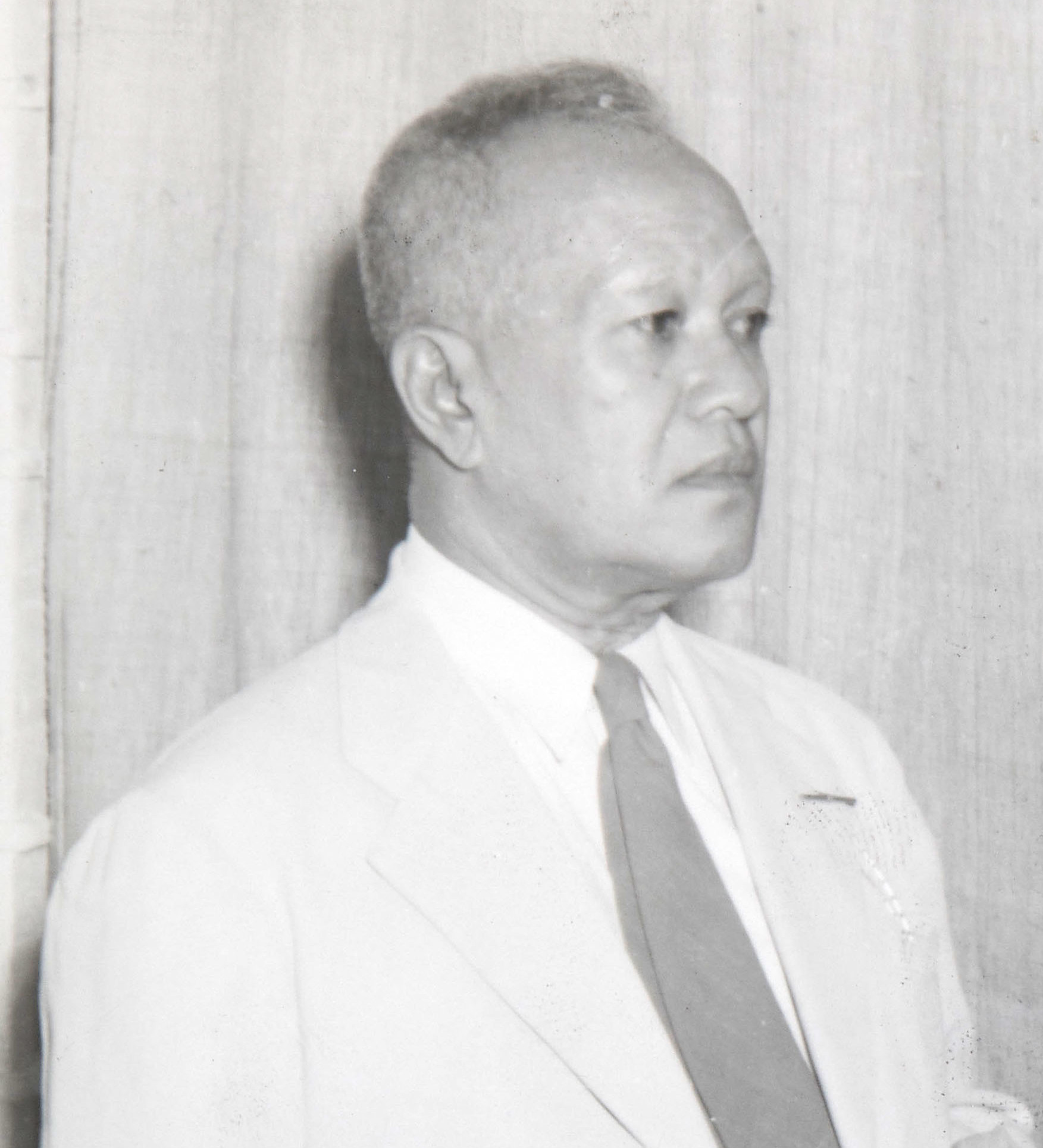

3rd Mayor of Padang
- In office 1947–1949
- Preceded by: Said Rasad
- Succeeded by: Rasidin

2nd Deputy Mayer of Padang
- In office 1931–1942
- Preceded by: Mr. C. Hoogenboom

Personal details
- Born: Padang, Tapanoeli Residency, Dutch East Indies
- Children: Egon Hakim
- Education: Docter Djawa School (STOVIA), Batavia

Abdoel Hakim, abbreviated A. Hakim, was a physician who served as mayor of Padang from 1947 to 1949. Previously, he served as the Deputy Mayor of Padang (Dutch: Loco-Burgemeester Padang) from 1931 to 1942 in the Dutch East Indies.

He was also the lead of the Jong Sumatranen Bond Congress in Padang.

== Career ==
After graduating from STOVIA in 1905, Abdoel Hakim was first assigned to his hometown, Padangsidempuan. In 1910, he was reassigned to Binjai and then reassigned to Tanjungpura.

His career in West Sumatra began in 1919, when he was assigned as the head of a local public health department.

In 1921, he was elected as a member of the City Council (Gemeenteraad) of Padang. He was re-elected as a member until 1942 (except from 1934 to 1938, as he was on leave). According to Freek Colombijn, his terms were very vital, as European councillors liked his personality so they were more willing to hear him and other native Indonesian councillors.

In 1923, he was reassigned to Boyolali and Labuhan Deli. In the following year, he was reassigned to Padang where he served as the head of public health department of Padangsche Benedenlanden (Coastal Padang Residency).

In 1931, he was appointed as the Deputy Mayor of Padang following the resignation of the previous deputy mayor. He held this position until 1942, when Japan occupied West Sumatra as part of the Japanese occupation of the Dutch East Indies.

During the First Dutch Military Aggression, Abdoel Hakim was elected by the Dutch as the Mayor of Padang to fill the vacancy after Mayor Bagindo Azizchan was shot on July 19, 1947. As mayor, he supported the federalism of the United States of Indonesia.

Preceded by Said Rasad	Mayor of Padang; 1947–1949	Succeeded by Rasidin
