= Dahlan Djambek =

Indonesian military officer and minister (1917–1961)

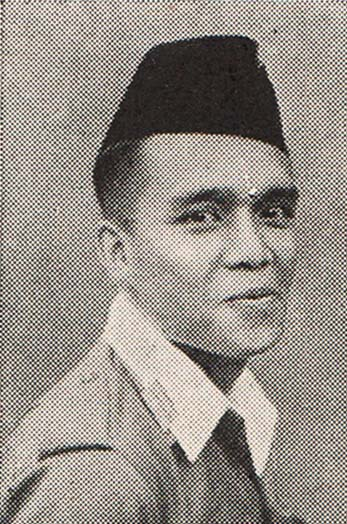

Military Regent of Agam
- In office 1949–1949
- President: Sukarno
- Preceded by: B.A. Murad
- Succeeded by: Said Rasad

Minister of Post and Telecommunications of the Revolutionary Government of the Republic of Indonesia
- In office 17 February 1958 – 13 September 1961
- Prime Minister: Sjafruddin Prawiranegara
- Preceding: Office established
- Preceded by: Office abolished

Personal details
- Born: 1917 Fort de Kock, Dutch East Indies (now Bukittinggi, West Sumatra, Indonesia)
- Died: September 13, 1961 (aged 43–44) Agam, West Sumatra, Indonesia
- Parent: Muhammad Jamil Jambek

Military service
- Allegiance: Empire of Japan (1943–1945); Indonesia (1945–1950); PRRI (1958–1961)
- Branch/service: PETA; Indonesian Army; APREV
- Years of service: 1943–1950, 1958–1961
- Rank: Colonel
- Commands: 3rd Banteng Division
- Battles/wars: Indonesian National Revolution; PRRI Rebellion

Colonel Dahlan Djambek (1917 — 13 September 1961) was a military officer, independence fighter, and minister in the Cabinet of the Revolutionary Government of the Republic of Indonesia (PRRI). During the Japanese occupation of West Sumatra, he was appointed Chairman of the Sumatra Chokai.

== Early life and education ==
Dahlan Djambek was born in 1917 at Bukittinggi, the son of a Minangkabau cleric, Sheikh Muhammad Jamil Jambek. In the pre-independence period, he was first educated in West Sumatra before receiving secondary education at Christelijk Algemene Middelbare School (AMS) in Salemba.

== Military career ==
In late 1943, with Japan beginning to lose the Pacific War, its government issued orders to form volunteer units in occupied Indonesia. Djambek joined this organization, becoming one of the first local officers to be trained by Japan in West Sumatra. After Japan's surrender and the proclamation of Indonesian independence, the nascent People's Security Army formed units across the country, and Djambek was appointed as division commander of the 3rd "Banteng" Division active in Central Sumatra (modern West Sumatra and Riau). Under Djambek's orders and planning, the division in 1946 crushed a revolutionary commune in Baso, Agam which had been robbing travellers and attacking government officials in its vicinity. The movement's leaders were executed, along with many followers. Djambek was later reassigned to head the army subcommand in Central Sumatra, while the division's command itself was transferred to Ismail Lengah.

Djambek was in Jakarta in early 1948, taking part in negotiations with the Dutch as an envoy of the Sumatran army command along with Maludin Simbolon. Following Operation Kraai late that year, Indonesian forces in West Sumatra were scattered, as the units were in a process of reorganisation with army leaders being away from their units. Djambek was near Bukittinggi during the offensive, and he aided the demoralized soldiers in reforming their units and allowed Indonesian forces to maintain control of regions north of Bukittinggi. This, however, caused some friction with his former subordinate Colonel Abdul Halim, who was commander of the northern territories. Djambek was also appointed as military regent of Agam Regency surrounding Bukittinggi by military governor Sutan Mohammad Rasjid.

After December 1950, Djambek was appointed as Military Attaché of the Republic of Indonesia in London. He was then appointed as deputy Army Chief of Staff, handling financial affairs. He resigned this post after he was accused of corruption in the purchase of military shoes.

After his resignation from the army headquarters, he left Jakarta and moved to Padang, where he was appointed Secretary General of the Gerakan Bersama Anti-Komunis (Gebak) which was founded in West Sumatra in September 1958. Dahlan resigned after months of attacks by pro-Communist Party of Indonesia (PKI) newspapers and his house was attacked with grenades by unknown assailants. Together with Gebak, Dahlan Djambek expanded the anti-communist movement in West Sumatra and accused the PKI of being the cause of the Sukarno-Hatta rift.

== Joining the PRRI ==
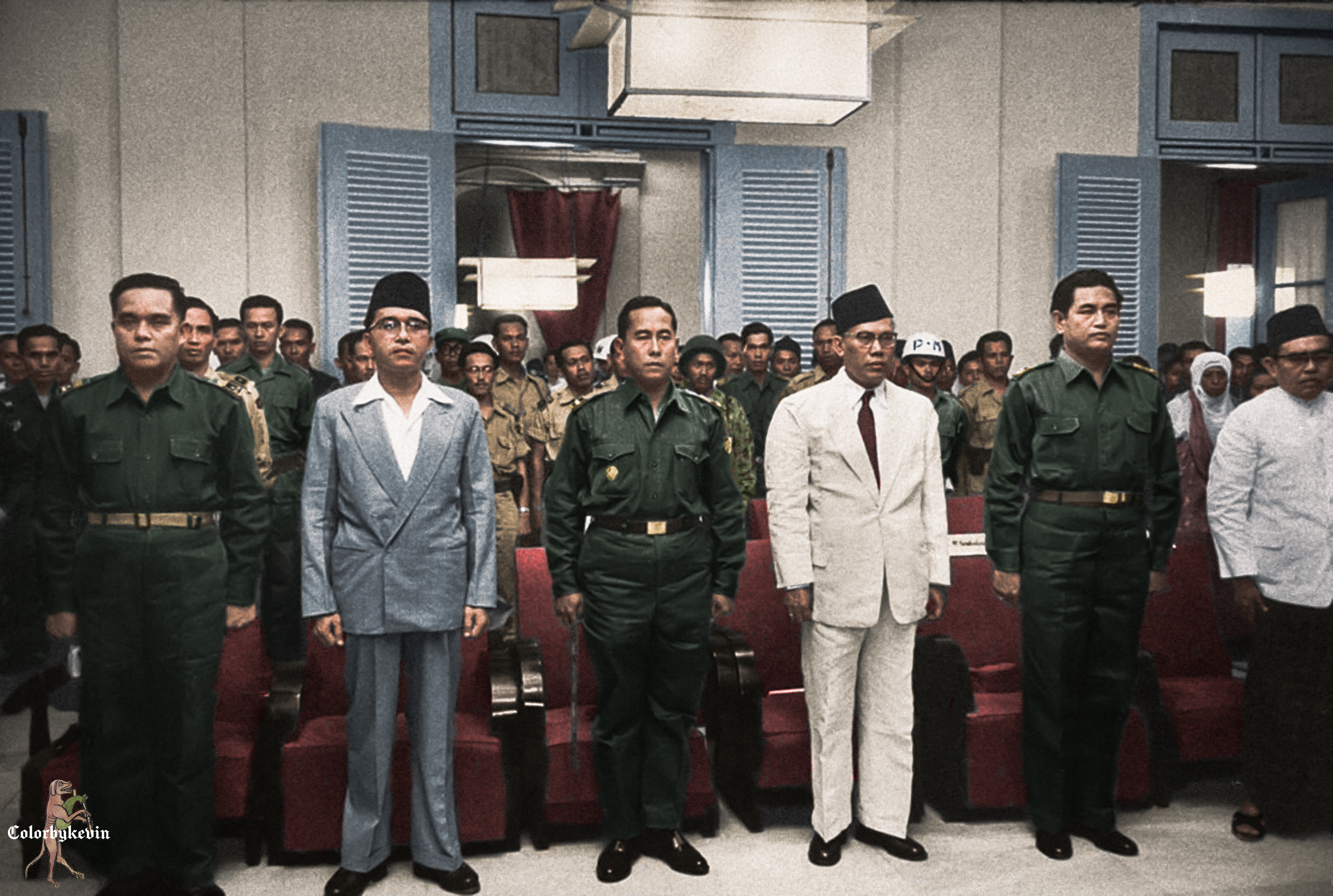
Dahlan Djambek (left) with other members of the PRRI Cabinet. March 01, 1958.

Dahlan Djambek was involved in the Revolutionary Government of the Republic of Indonesia (PRRI), a rival government proclaimed by several figures in West Sumatra in 1958, due to dissatisfaction with the Old Order government led by President Sukarno. In the PRRI Cabinet, Dahlan served as Minister of Home Affairs and Minister of Posts and Telecommunications. At that time, he held the rank of Colonel and led the Banteng Division.

After appeals were unsuccessful, the central government sent troops from Java, which ultimately succeeded in suppressing the PRRI movement. Dahlan Djambek and other PRRI figures then fought a guerrilla war in the forests of Central Sumatra. When he was about to surrender in 1961, Dahlan was shot and killed in the village of Lariang, Palupuh, Agam by OPR (Organisasi Perlawanan Rakyat) troops, a paramilitary force affiliated to the Communist Party of Indonesia and trained by the central government.
