= Bagindo Azizchan =

National Hero of Indonesia

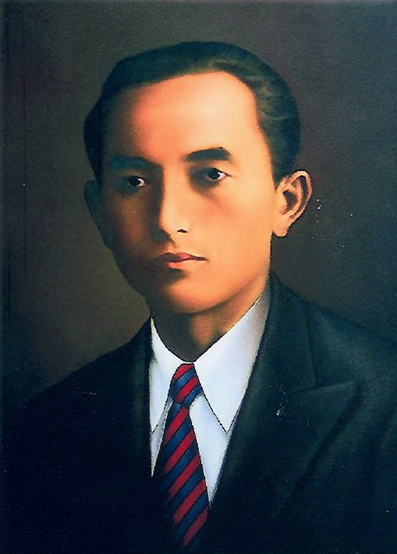

2nd Mayor of Padang
- In office 15 August 1946 – 19 July 1947
- Preceded by: Mr. Abubakar Jaar
- Succeeded by: Said Rasad

1st Deputy Mayor of Padang
- In office 24 January 1946 – 15 August 1946

Personal details
- Born: 30 September 1910 (Netherlands) Padang, West Sumatra, Dutch East Indies
- Died: 19 July 1947 (aged 36) (Indonesia) Padang, West Sumatra
- Party: Union of Indonesian Muslims (until 1937); Indonesian Islamic Union Party (1945-1947)
- Spouse(s): R. Entis Atisah; Hj. Siti Zaura Oesman.
- Children: Hj. Ineke Azizchan Nafis
- Education: Rechtshoogeschool te Batavia

Bagindo Azizchan (30 September 1910 – 19 July 1947), was an Indonesian independence fighter and the second post-independence Mayor of Padang, inaugurated on 15 August 1946 replacing Abubakar Jaar.

He died at 36, 2 days before the First Dutch Military Aggression. His body was buried at the Bahagia Heroes Cemetery, Bukittinggi. Through Presidential Decree No. 082/TK/2005, on 5 November 2005, he was posthumously awarded Bintang Mahaputera Adipradana. On 9 November 2005, he was declared a National Hero of Indonesia.

== Early life and education ==
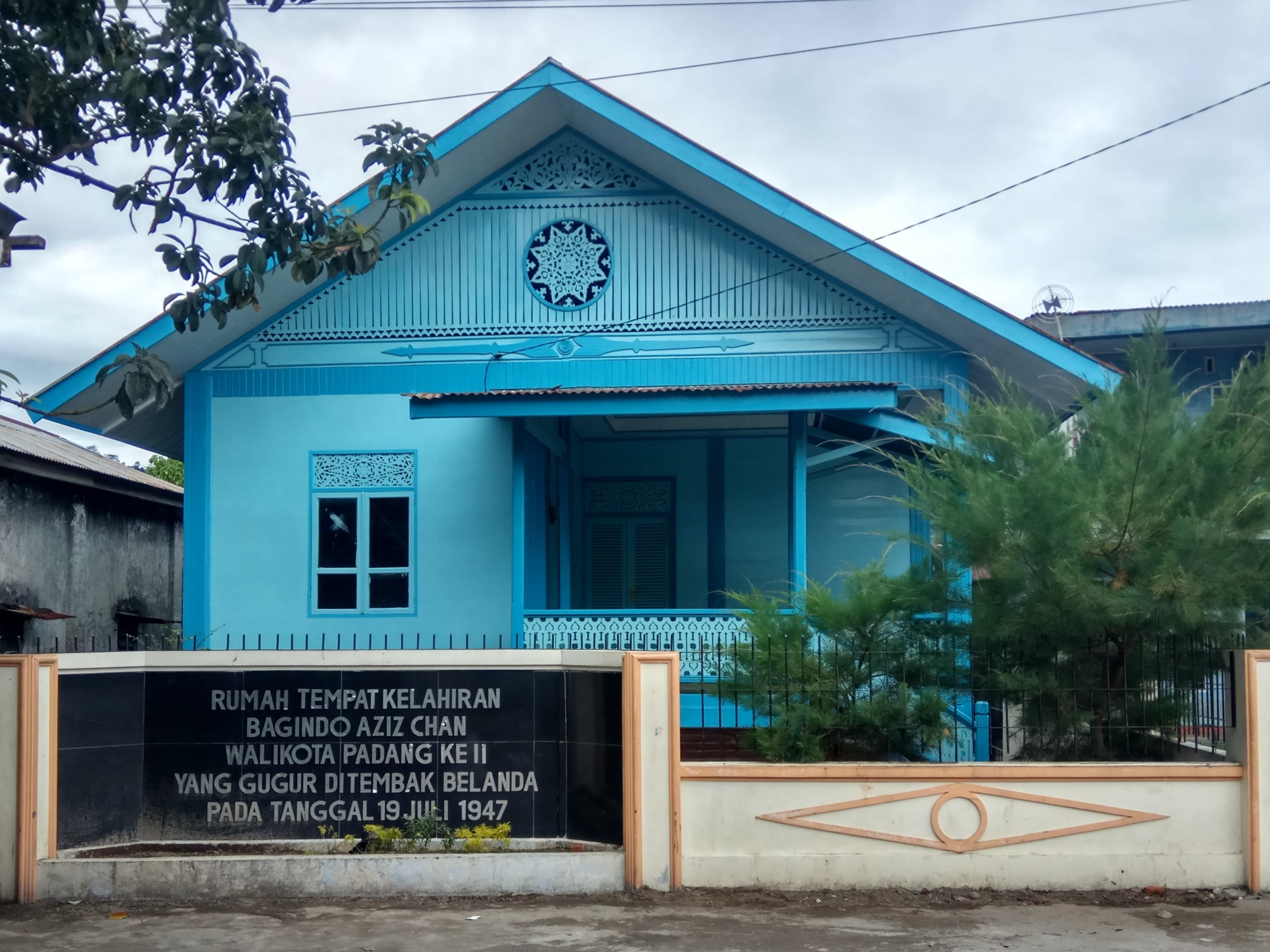
Birthplace of Bagindo Aziz Chan

Bagindo Aziz Chan was born in Alang Laweh, Padang on 30 September 1910. He was the fourth of six children from the marriage of Bagindo Montok and Djamilah.

Bagindo Aziz Chan studied at a Hollandsch-Inlandsche School in Padang, MULO in Surabaya, and Algemene Middelbare School in Batavia. He spent two years at Rechtshoogeschool te Batavia and opened a law practice. He was also active in several organizations, including as a board member of Jong Islamieten Bond under the leadership of Agus Salim.

Returning to his hometown in 1935, he served as a teacher in several schools in Padang and moved multiple times to teach in other cities. He was active in Permi until the organization was dissolved in 1937.

== During the Independence War ==
After proclamation of independence, he was appointed Deputy Mayor of Padang on 24 January 1946 and on 15 August 1946 was appointed as mayor replacing Abubakar Jaar, who moved to become a resident in North Sumatra.

After the arrival of the Dutch and the Allies in Padang on 10 October 1945, he refused to submit to Dutch forces. He continued to fight by writing in the newspaper Tjahaja Padang, even directly leading the resistance against the Dutch until he died on 19 July 1947. He made a public speech, "Step over my corpse first, then I'll hand over Padang".

== Death ==
On late afternoon of 19 July 1947, Bagindo and his family went from Padang to Padangpanjang. However, in Purus, Padang, his convoy was intercepted by Lieutenant Colonel van Erps who informed him of an incident in Naggalo, which was the Dutch demarcation line.

According to the Dutch version, when Bagindo stepped out of his jeep, he was shot in the neck then rushed to a hospital. However, according to a post-mortem carried out at Dr. Reksowiryo Army Hospital, he died from blunt force trauma which caved in his skull, and there were three post-mortem gunshots to the face.

His body was buried on 20 July 1947 at 02.00 am in a large ceremony attended by civil servants and military officers at the Bahagia Heroes Cemetery. The day after the burial, the Dutch launched the First Dutch Military Aggression.

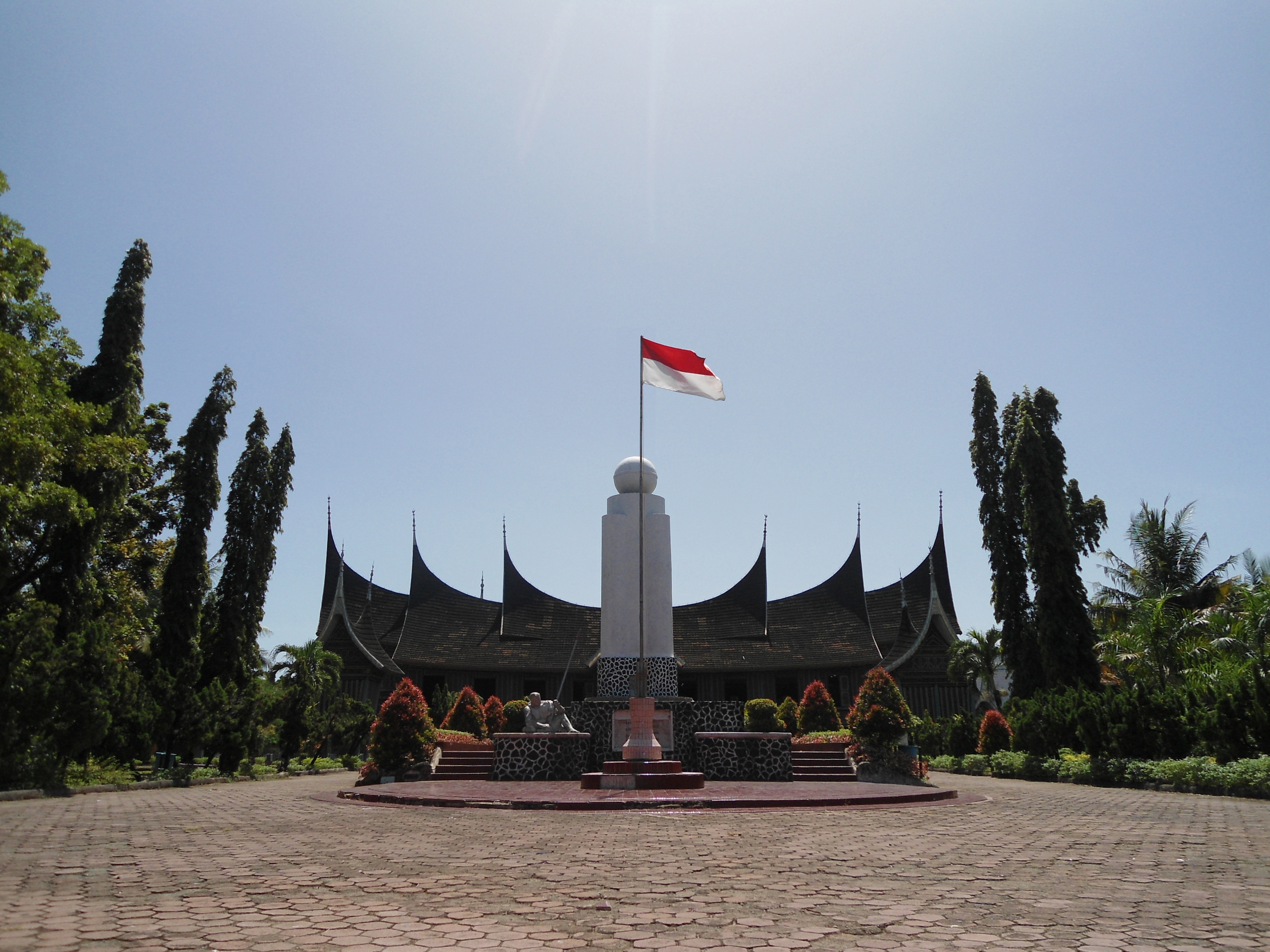
Bagindo Azizchan Monument at the Adityawarman Museum

== Honors ==
To honor his service and sacrifice, Bagindo Aziz Chan's name was immortalised as a street name in several cities, such as Padang and Bukittinggi. In Padang, a fist-shaped monument was erected at the intersection of Jalan Gajah Mada and Jalan Jhoni Anwar, Olo Village, Nanggalo. Although it was inaugurated as the Bagindo Aziz Chan Monument by the Mayor of Padang Syahrul Ujud on 19 July 1983, this monument and its intersection are better known as the Tugu Simpang Tinju.

Another monument, located at Taman Melati in the Museum Adityawarman complex, is the work of the painter Wisran Hadi and the sculptor Arby Samah. It is 2,75m tall and was inaugurated on 19 July 1973 by Mayor of Padang Hasan Basri Durin.

== Personal life ==
Bagindo Azizchan was married twice, to the Sundanese R. Atisah Adiwirya and Siti Zaura Oesman (1912-1996) of Padang.

From the first wife, he had 7 children, who are called Roswita Azizchan, Bagindo Radhi Azizchan, Upy Azumar Azizchan, Bagindo Azir Azizchan, Andoda Nushati Azizchan, Huriah Pratiwi Azizchan, and Bagindo Rendra Azizchan. Among his grandchildren, there are Jeanne Noveline Tedja, Aryanti W. Puspokusumo, and Ayu Suzanne A. W. Puspokusumo.

From the second wife, he had a daughter named Ineke Azizchan Nafis.

Political offices
Preceded by Mr. Abubakar Jaar	Mayor of Padang; 1946–1947	Succeeded by Said Rasad
