= Zuiyen Rais =

Indonesian academic and politician (1940–2022)

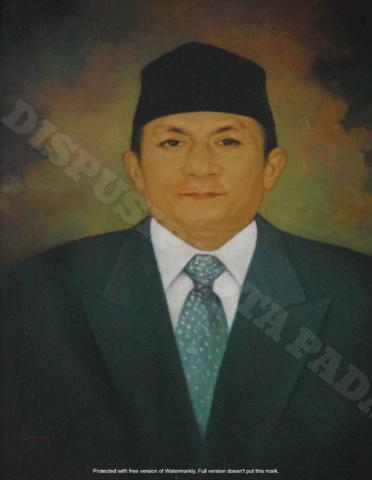
- Rais in 2003

Mayor of Padang
- In office 20 July 2000 – 11 June 2003
- Preceded by: Masri Payan (acting)
- Succeeded by: Fauzi Bahar
- In office 17 April 1993 – 28 December 1999
- Preceded by: Syahrul Ujud
- Succeeded by: Masri Payan (acting)

Personal details
- Born: 13 December 1940 Kapau, Agam Regency, Dutch East Indies
- Died: 10 November 2022 (aged 81) Padang, Indonesia
- Education: State University of Padang; IPB University
- Occupation: Lecturer

Zuiyen Rais (13 December 1940 – 10 November 2022) was an Indonesian politician. He served as Mayor of Padang from 1993 to 1999 and again from 2000 to 2003.

Rais died in Padang on 10 November 2022, at the age of 81.
