= Said Rasjad =

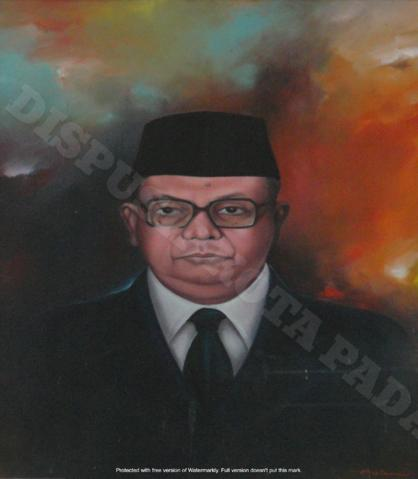

Mayor of Padang
- In office 1947–1947
- President: Sukarno
- Preceded by: Bagindo Azizchan
- Succeeded by: Abdoel Hakim

Military regent of Agam
- In office 1949–1950
- Preceded by: Dahlan Djambek
- Succeeded by: Harun Al-Rasyid Sutan Bandaro

Fourth Bupati of Padang Pariaman
- In office 1950–1953
- Preceded by: BA. Murad
- Succeeded by: Taher Samad

Personal details
- Education: Algemene Middelbare School (AMS) Batavia
- Profession: teacher, politician

Said Rasjad (EYD: Said Rasyad) served as acting mayor of Padang, bupati of Agam, and regent of Padang Pariaman.

Said Rasjad completed his MULO education in Padang and continued to an algemene middelbare school in Batavia. After graduating, Rasjad worked as a teacher.

On November 27, 1945 at School of Simpang Haru (Kageo Gakko, former Ambacht School, now SMK) the Padang Area incident or Simpang Haru Incident occurred. The incident started with the forced occupation of the school by KNIL soldiers. This led to protests from Said Rasjad, who was a teacher and principal. KNIL soldiers then forcibly beaten Said Rasjad until he was incapacitated. This sparked resistance from the Republicans at the school and in the evening a group of youths attacked the soldiers at the school.

Said was appointed mayor of Padang in 1947 after the previous mayor, Bagindo Azizchan, was killed by Dutch forces. During the war Rasjad moved the government seat to Padangpanjang. Then, the Dutch appointed Abdoel Hakim as mayor of Padang.

Said Rasjad was appointed as military regent of Agam from 1949 to 1950 replacing the previous military regent, Dahlan Djambek. Rasjad was then appointed regent of Padang Pariaman from 1950 to 1953.

Political offices
Preceded by Bagindo Azizchan	Mayor of Padang; 1947	Succeeded by Abdoel Hakim
