= Johannes Vallentin Dominicus Werbata =

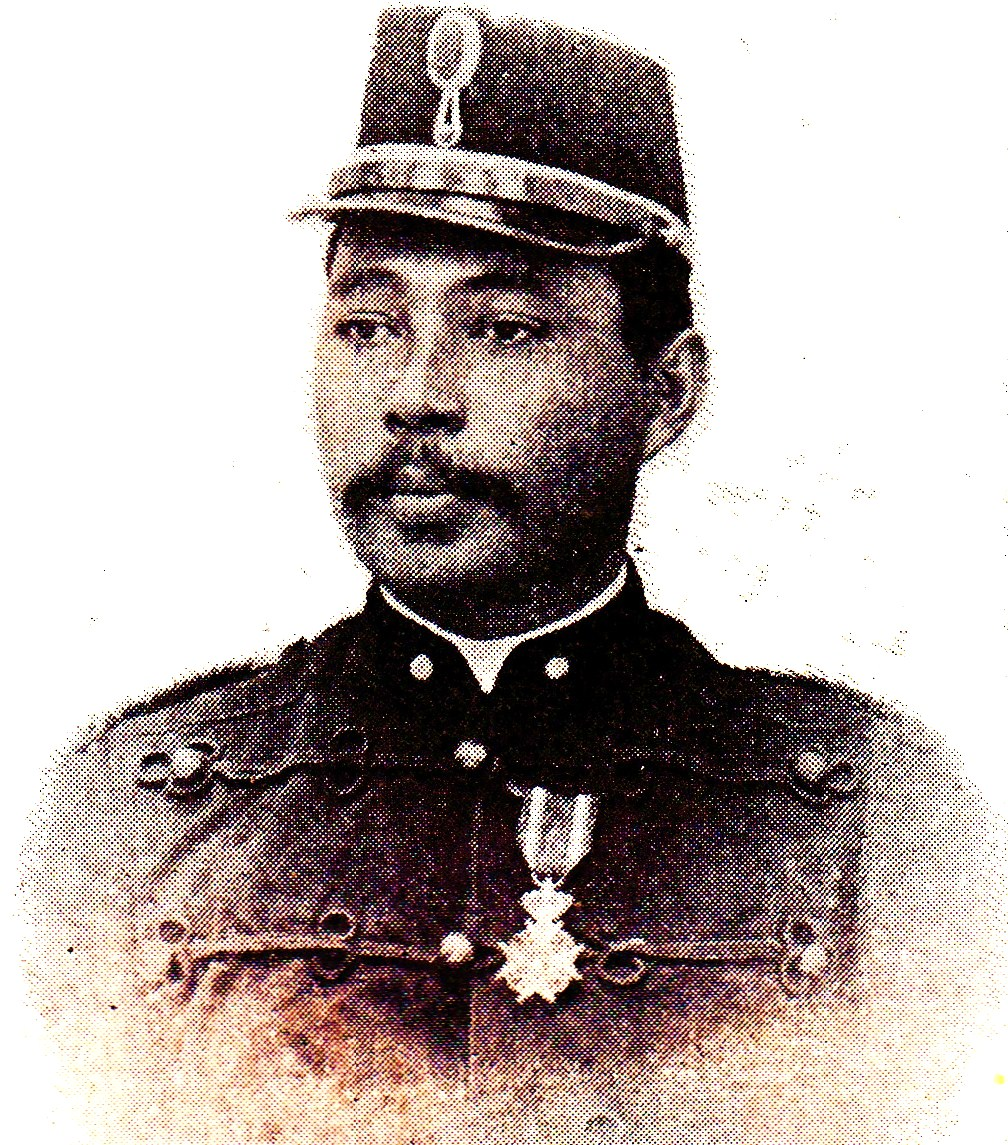
J.V.D. Werbata

Johannes Vallentin Dominicus Werbata (Padang, 22 September 1866 - Magelang, 2 June 1929), better known by his initials JVD, was a military superintendent, first class sensor and knight in the Military William Order fourth grade.

== Sources ==
- 1900. J. van R. J.D.V. Werbata. Ridder vierde klasse in de Militaire Willemsorde. Militair opzichter, eerste klasse opnemer. Eigen Haard, blz. 447-448
- 2006. P. van der Krogt. The Werbata-Jonckheer maps. The first topographic maps of the Netherlands Antilles, 1911-1915. International Symposium on “Old Worlds-New Worlds”: The History of Colonial Cartography 1750–1950. Utrecht University, Utrecht, The Netherlands, 21 to 23 August 2006.
