= Sikuai =

Island in West Sumatra, Indonesia

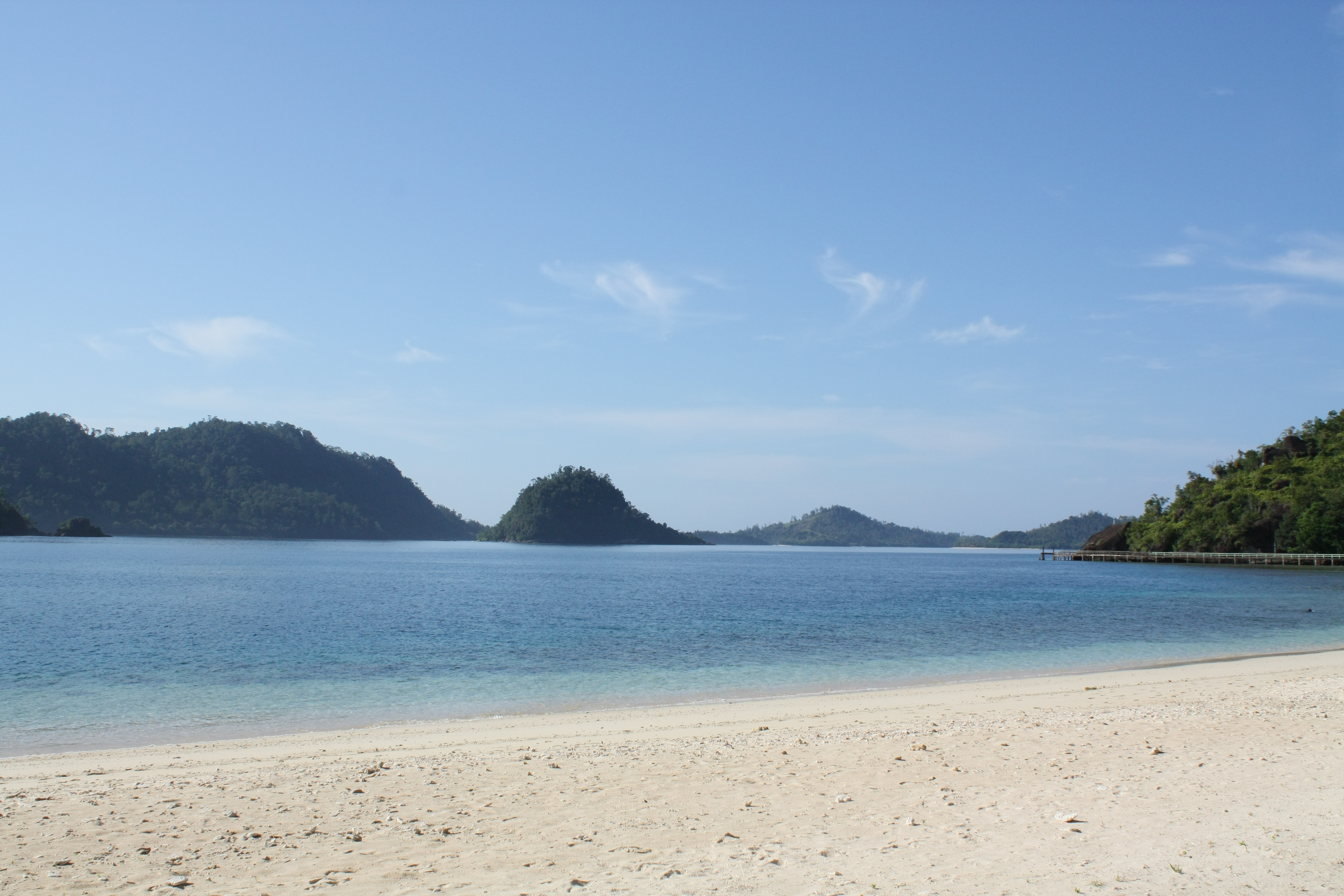
- Beach of Sikuai island
- Interactive map of Sikuai

Geography
- Location: Southeast Asia
- Coordinates: 1°7′39.07″S 100°21′9.1″E
- Area: 4.4 ha (11 acres)

Administration
- Indonesia
- Province: West Sumatra
- Municipal: Padang

Sikuai is an island in the sub-district of Bungus Teluk Kabung, City of Padang, West Sumatra Province, Indonesia.

The island is located about a half mile from the center of Padang and can be achieved using marine transportation such as ships, approximately 35 minutes from port of Muara Padang.
