= Mayor of Padang =

Public office in Indonesia

- Seal of Padang

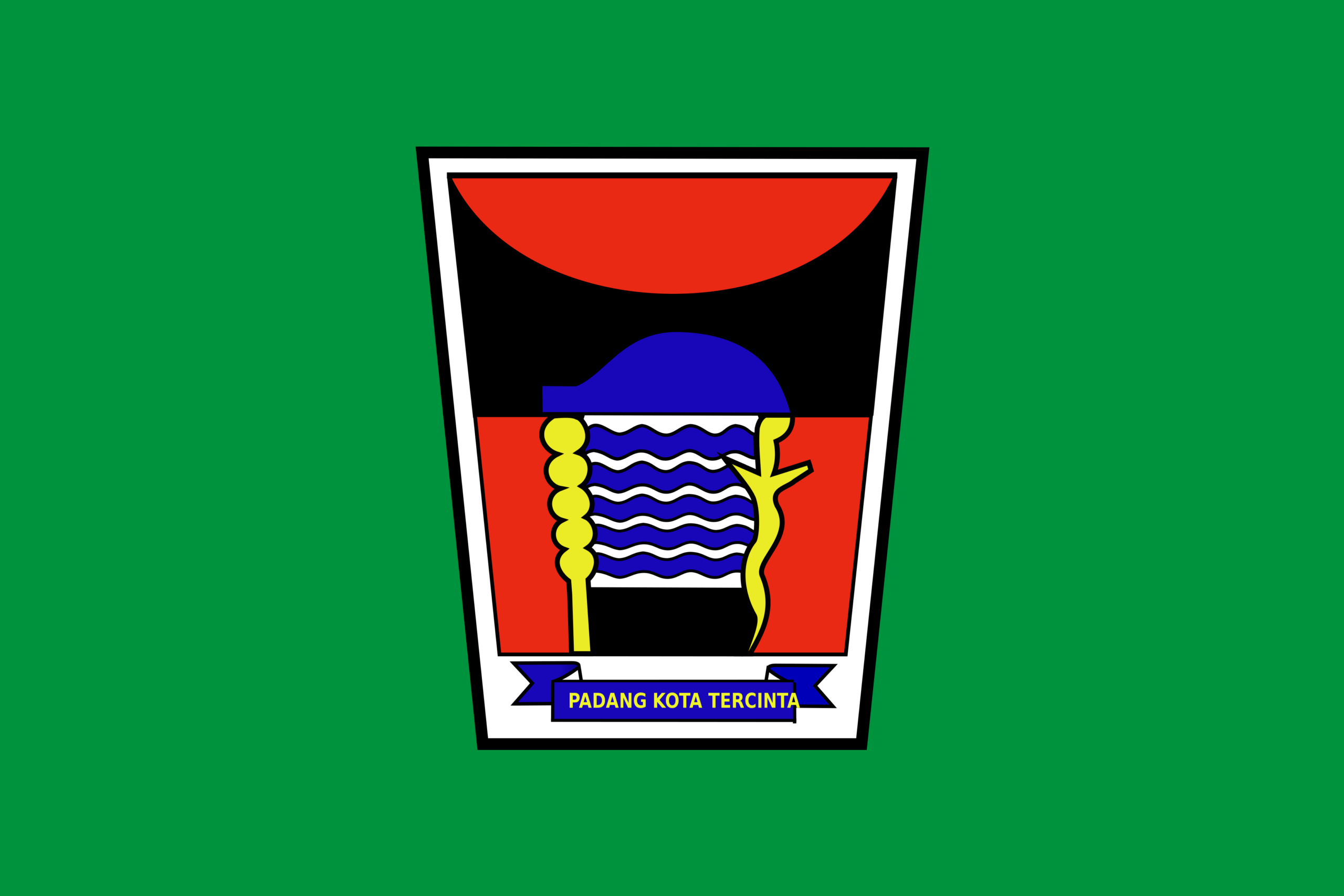
- Flag of Padang

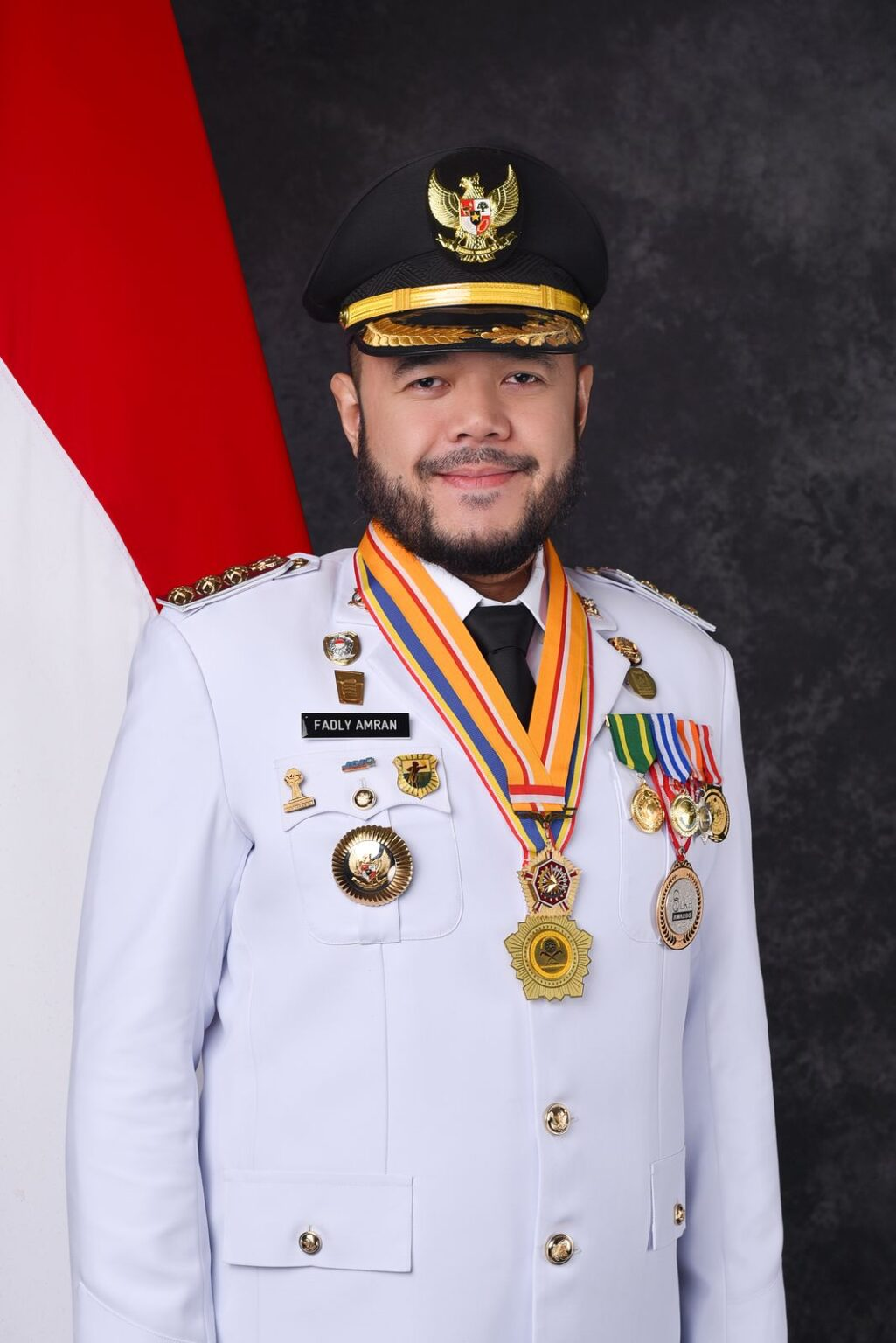
- Incumbent; Fadly Amran since 20 February 2025
- Term length: 5 years, renewable once
- Inaugural holder: Abubakar Jaar (after Indonesian independence)
- Formation: 1925
- Deputy: Maigus Nasir
- Website: www.padang.go.id

The Mayor of Padang is an elected politician who is accountable for the strategic government of Padang, one of the provincial capitals in Indonesia. The position was first held by W.M. Ouwerkerk when the role was created in 1928 by the Dutch colonial government, while under government of Indonesia it was first held by Abubakar Jaar in 1945, after Indonesian independence.

Mayors of Indonesian provinces are now chosen via popular election. Fadly Amran has held the position since 2025 until 2030 after being elected in the 2024 election.

Below is a list of mayors of Padang.

Dutch East Indies Administration (1928–1942)
Portrait	Mayor	Took office	Left office	Vice Mayor	Annotation
	Mr. Willem Matthijs Ouwerkerk	23 November 1928	1940	Mr. C. Hoogenboom (1928–1931)	(Note: The first Padang Burgemeester)
	Mr. Willem Matthijs Ouwerkerk	23 November 1928	1940	M. Passer (1931.–...) dr. Abdoel Hakim (1931–1940)	
	Dirk Kapteijn	4 November 1940	1942	dr. Abdoel Hakim	
Japan Administration (1942–1945)
Portrait	Mayor	Took office	Left office	Vice Mayor	Annotation
	Abdoel Madjid Usman	1942	1943		
Indonesia Administration (1945–now)
Portrait	Mayor	Took office	Left office	Vice Mayor	Annotation
	dr. Abdoel Hakim (Acting)	1945	October 1945	Sutan Ahmad (Acting)	
	Mr. Abubakar Jaar	October 1945	1946	Bagindo Azizchan	
	Bagindo Azizchan	15 August 1946	19 July 1947		(Note: Died in a battle against the Dutch)
	Said Rasjad	1947	1947		
	dr. Abdoel Hakim (Acting)	6 August 1947	December 1949		
	dr. Rasidin	10 December 1949	1956		
	Bachtiar Datuk Pado Panghulu	1956	1958		
	Zainul Abidin Sutan Pangeran	31 May 1958	1966		(Note: Resign on June 1966)
	Drs. H. Azhari (Acting)	1966	1967		
	Drs. H. Achirul Yahya	1967	1971		
	Drs. H. Hasan Basri Durin	1971	1973		(Note: Acting)
	Drs. H. Hasan Basri Durin	1973	1978		(Note: Two terms since 1973)
	Drs. H. Hasan Basri Durin	1978	1983		
	H. Syahrul Ujud; SH	1983	1988		
	H. Syahrul Ujud; SH	1988	1993		(Note: Two terms)
	Drs. H. Zuiyen Rais; MS	17 June 1993	17 June 1998		
	Drs. H. Zuiyen Rais; MS	17 June 1998	28 December 1999		(Note: The mayor has been inactive since 28 December 1999, replaced by Masri Payan as acting mayor, reappointed on 20 July 2000.)
	Drs. H. Masril Payan (Acting)	28 December 1999	20 July 2000		
	Drs. H. Zuiyen Rais; MS	20 July 2000	17 April 2003		
	Drs. H. Zuiyen Rais; MS	17 April 2003	11 June 2003		(Note: Acting for two months, 17 April 2003 to 11 June 2003)
	Drs. H. Oktisir Sjovijerli Asir (Acting)	12 June 2003	17 February 2004		
	Dr. H. Fauzi Bahar; MSi	17 February 2004	17 February 2009	Yusman Kasim	
	Dr. H. Fauzi Bahar; MSi	17 February 2009	19 February 2014	Mahyeldi Ansharullah	(Note: Two terms, re-elected in mayoral election in 2008)
	H. Erizal; SH (Acting)	19 February 2014	13 May 2014	—	
	H. Mahyeldi Ansharullah; SP	13 May 2014	13 May 2019	Emzalmi	
	H. Mahyeldi Ansharullah; SP	13 May 2019	25 February 2021	Hendri Septa	(Note: Two terms, re-elected in the mayoral election in 2018.)
	H. Hendri Septa; B.Bus. (Acc.), MIB	25 February 2021	7 April 2021	–	(Note: Acting)
	H. Hendri Septa; B.Bus. (Acc.), MIB	7 April 2021	13 May 2024	Ekos Albar (2023–24)	
	Dr. H. Andree Harmadi Algamar; S.STP., S.H., M.Si., M.Han. (Acting)	13 May 2024	17 May 2024	–	(Note: Acting)
	Dr. H. Andree Harmadi Algamar; S.STP., S.H., M.Si., M.Han. (Acting)	17 May 2024	20 February 2025	–	(Note: Acting)
	H. Fadly Amran; B.B.A	20 February 2025	Incumbent	Maigus Nasir	

Annotations

== See also ==
- Padang
- List of incumbent regional heads and deputy regional heads in West Sumatra
