= Fadly Amran =

Indonesian politician (born 1988)

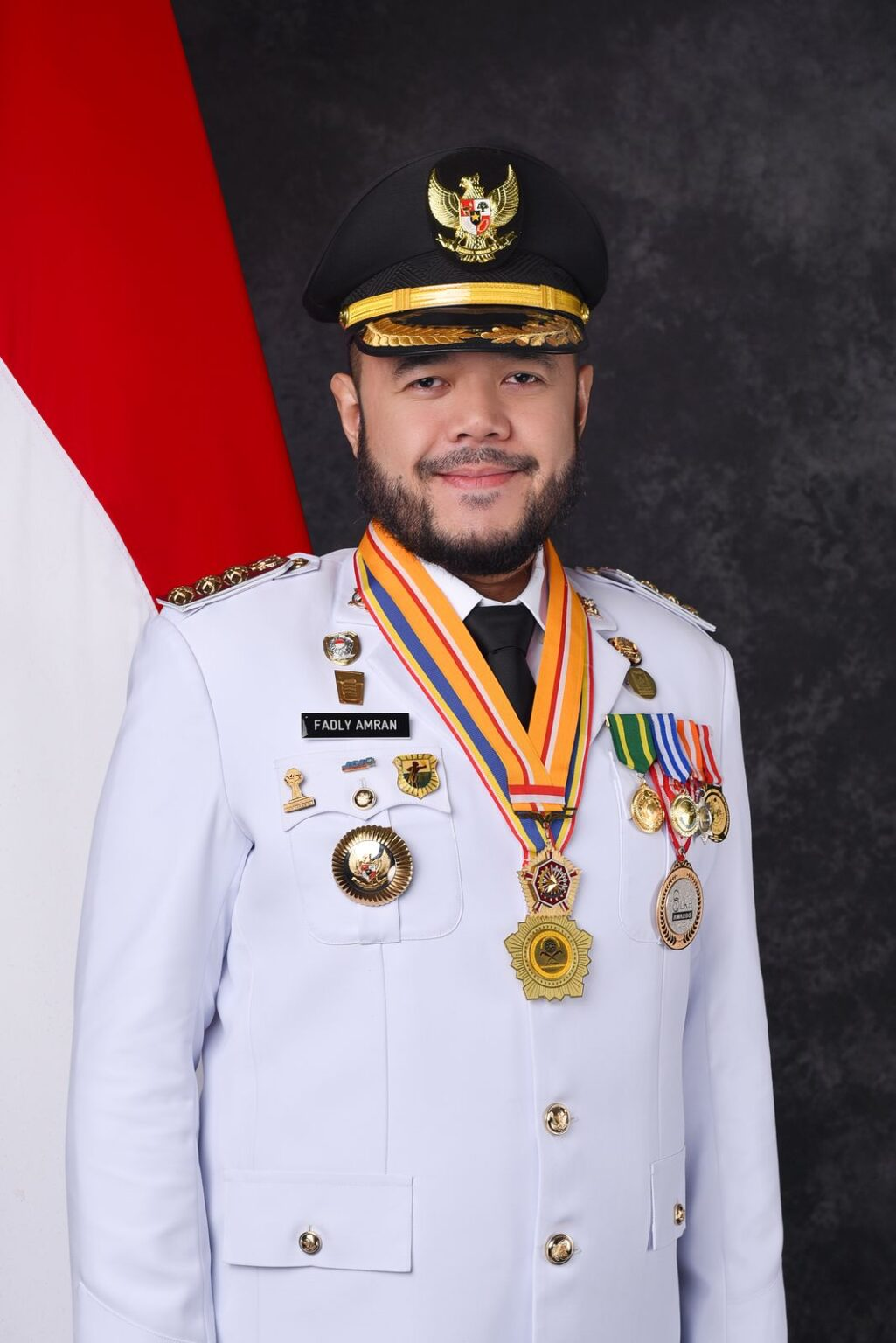

15th Mayor of Padang
- Incumbent
- Assumed office 20 February 2025
- President: Prabowo Subianto
- Governor: Mahyeldi Ansharullah
- Deputy: Maigus Nasir
- Preceded by: Hendri Septa; Andree Harmadi Algamar (Acting)

15th Mayor of Padang Panjang
- In office 9 October 2018 – 9 October 2023
- President: Joko Widodo
- Governor: Irwan Prayitno; Alwis (Acting); Hamdani (Acting); Mahyeldi
- Deputy: Asrul
- Preceded by: Hendri Arnis; Martoni (Acting)
- Succeeded by: Sonny Budaya Putra (Acting); Hendri Arnis

Personal details
- Born: February 9, 1988 (age 38) Padang, West Sumatra, Indonesia
- Party: NasDem Party
- Spouse: Dian Puspita
- Children: 3
- Parents: Amran St. Sidi Sulaiman (father); Maizarnis (mother)
- Education: Seattle University
- Occupation: Businessman, politician
- Known for: Chairman of KNPI and NasDem Party of West Sumatra

Fadly Amran, styled Datuak Paduko Malano (born 9 February 1988), is an Indonesian businessman and politician from the NasDem Party who has served as the Mayor of Padang for the 2025–2030 period. Previously, he served as the Mayor of Padang Panjang for the 2018–2023 period.

Coming from a business family, Fadly studied business at Seattle University, United States. His family's business includes hospitals, schools, and universities under the Baiturrahmah Educational Foundation. Fadly himself runs a business in the sports and fitness sector in Padang.

With a net worth of Rp77.9 billion, Fadly was recorded as the candidate with the third highest net worth in Indonesia during the 2018 Indonesian local elections. He was elected as the winner, defeating the incumbent mayor, Hendri Arnis, by a margin of 853 votes.

== Early life ==
Tomb of Amran Sutan Sidi Sulaiman, Fadly Amran's father

Fadly Amran was born in Padang, West Sumatra on 9 February 1988. He is the second of seven children. His father, Amran Sutan Sidi Sulaiman (1929–2021), was a Muhammadiyah businessman born in Panyalaian, Tanah Datar who founded the Baiturrahmah Educational Foundation and Siti Rahmah Hospital in Padang. His mother, Maizarnis, is his father's fourth wife who is now the chairwoman of the foundation following her husband's passing. Fadly spent his childhood and teenage years in Padang. He received his education at Baiturrahmah Kindergarten in Padang (1992–1993), Baiturrahmah Elementary School (1993–1999), State Junior High School 2 Padang (1999–2002), and the Science major at State Senior High School 1 Padang (2002–2005).

Upon graduating from high school, a debate occurred between Fadly and his father. His father encouraged all of his children to become doctors, as his older siblings were all doctors. His father told him to study medicine in Jakarta. However, Fadly remained firm in his decision to leave for the United States to study business. With a heavy heart, he left his ailing father and continued his education in the United States.

Fadly earned an Associate of Arts and Sciences (A.A.S.) degree from Shoreline Community College (2005–2007). He went on to major in Finance and earned a Bachelor of Arts in business administration (B.B.A.) from Seattle University, Seattle in 2009. He served as the External Legislative of the Indonesian Students Association in the United States (Permias) from 2007 to 2009.

== Career ==
After graduating from college in 2009, Fadly started an internet cafe business. He joined the Padang City branch of the Indonesian Young Entrepreneurs Association (HIPMI), becoming its general secretary for the 2009–2012 period. In 2014, he founded and became the Director of PT Bangun Harapan Indonesia, which is engaged in several sports and fitness centers as well as mini-markets. The following year, he founded and also became the Director of PT Arfa Bangun Perkasa. Fadly was also appointed as the Secretary of the Baiturrahmah University Foundation and the Siti Rahmah Islamic Hospital Foundation.

In the following years, Fadly became active in various organizations. In 2011, he joined the Indonesian Chamber of Commerce and Industry (Kadin) of West Sumatra as the Permanent Committee for Trade and Services until 2014. In 2012, he was elected as the General Chairman of BPC HIPMI Padang City and Chairman of the West Sumatra branch of the Indonesian Target Shooting and Hunting Association (Perbakin) for the period up to 2015. In 2013, he was appointed as the Local President of Junior Chamber International (JCI) Indonesia West Sumatra until 2014.

In 2015, Fadly was selected as the Chairman of the Indonesian National Youth Committee (KNPI) Padang City for the period up to 2018. In 2017, he was chosen as the General Chairman of the West Sumatra branch of the Indonesian Film Artists Association (PARFI) for two periods from 2017 to 2025. He was also appointed as the Head of the Organizational Division of the National Sports Committee of Indonesia (KONI) West Sumatra for the 2017–2021 period. In 2018, he was elected as the Chairman of KNPI West Sumatra for the period up to 2022.

=== Political career ===
Fadly Amran as Mayor of Padang Panjang, 2018

In the 2018 Padang Panjang mayoral election, Fadly Amran ran for mayor paired with bureaucrat Asrul. The Fadly–Asrul pair was endorsed by the Party of Functional Groups (Golkar) and the Indonesian Democratic Party of Struggle (PDI-P). In this election, Fadly could not vote because he was not a resident of Padang Panjang, but instead held a Padang City Identity Card (KTP). Contested by four pairs of candidates, this pair successfully defeated the incumbent mayoral candidate Hendri Arnis–Eko Furqani by a margin of 853 votes. The Fadly-Asrul pair was inaugurated by the Governor of West Sumatra Irwan Prayitno on 9 October 2018 at the Governor's Office of West Sumatra.

On 27 July 2022, Fadly was appointed by Surya Paloh to be the Chairman of the Regional Leadership Council (DPW) of the West Sumatra NasDem Party, replacing Hendrajoni.

In the 2024 Padang mayoral election, Fadly Amran ran as a mayoral candidate paired with former Member of the West Sumatra Regional House of Representatives Maigus Nasir. The Fadly–Maigus pair was endorsed by the NasDem Party, Golkar Party, National Awakening Party, PDI-P, United Development Party, and the Ummah Party. The pair won against two other candidate pairs by obtaining 176,648 votes or 55.17 percent of the valid votes. Fadly Amran replaced Hendri Septa (the incumbent). Hendri Septa, who was unwilling to accept defeat, filed a lawsuit to the Constitutional Court (MK), but the MK rejected the lawsuit from the defeated Hendri Septa.

The pair was inaugurated by President Prabowo Subianto simultaneously with hundreds of regional heads across Indonesia at the State Palace on 20 February 2025.

== Awards ==
Fadly was given the title Datuak Panduko Malano by the Kutianyie tribe clan in Nagari Simpuruik, Sungai Tarab District, Tanah Datar Regency during the malewakan gala procession on 7–9 September 2018.

- Gold Pin for Cooperative and Small and Medium Enterprises Service Bakti from the Minister of Cooperatives and Small and Medium Enterprises of the Republic of Indonesia (2021)
- Manggala Karya Kencana from the National Population and Family Planning Board (2022)
- Cultural Award from the Indonesian Journalists Association (2022)
- Upakarti Artheswara Tinarbuka Award from the Central Information Commission (2023)
- Legion of Veterans Star from the Veterans Legion of the Republic of Indonesia (2023)
- Indonesian Figure Appreciation for the Digitalization Development category from Tempo magazine (2023)
- Intermediate Cooperative Mover Award from the Indonesian Cooperative Council (2023)
- Temenggong Tun Hassan DMDI Award from the Yang di-Pertua Negeri of Malacca as President of the Malay and Islamic World Organisation presented by the Deputy Prime Minister of Cambodia (2023)

== Personal life ==
Fadly Amran is married to a cardiologist and pulmonologist named Dian Puspita and has a son named Ashraf Faddian Amran, as well as twin sons named Azhar and Azlan who were born in February 2026.

Political offices
Preceded by Andree Harmadi Algamar (Acting)	Mayor of Padang; 2025–present	Incumbent
Preceded by Martoni (Acting)	Mayor of Padang Panjang; 2018–2023	Succeeded by Sonny Budaya Putra (Acting)
Party political offices
Preceded by Hendrajoni	Chairman of the West Sumatra NasDem Party; 2022–present	Incumbent
