= Abubakar Jaar =

Indonesian politician

Abubakar Jaar (died in Padang, 22 March 1985 at the age of 86 years) was a civil servant and lawyer for the Dutch East Indies. After the independence of Indonesia, he was mayor of Padang and resident of North Sumatra replacing Luat Siregar and resident of West Sumatra.

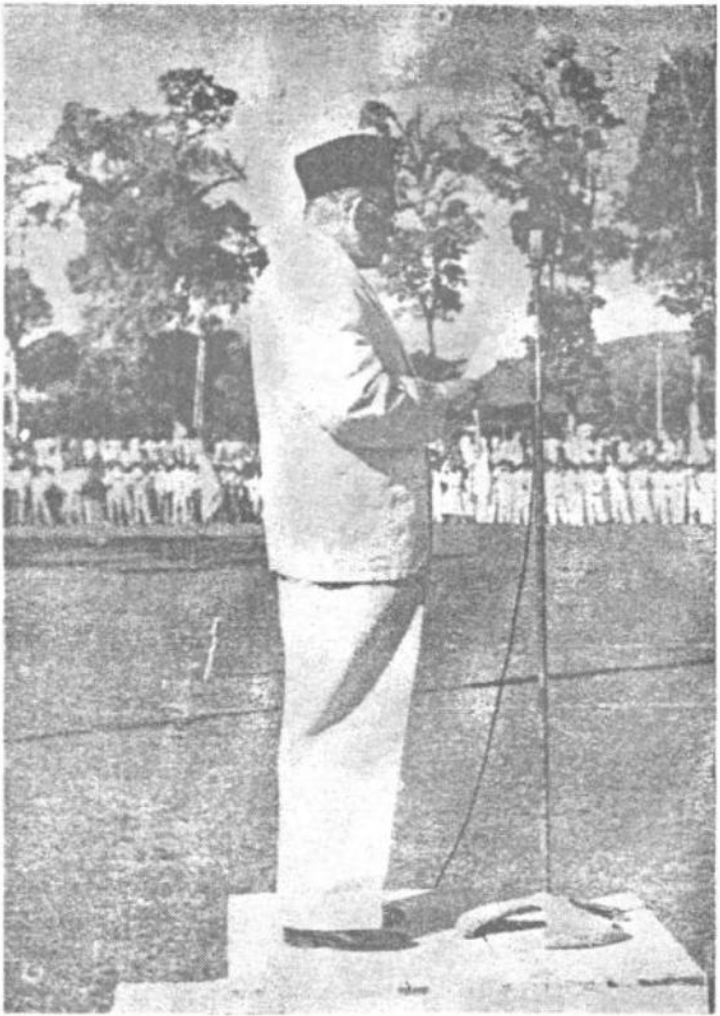
Resident Mr. Abu Bakar Djaar representing The Governor of Central Sumatra giving an opening speech during a flag raising ceremony at Lapangan Kantin Bukittinggi, 21 November 1956

Before independence, Abubakar Jaar was a teacher at the Islamic High School (STI) Padang which was founded by Mahmud Yunus. He became one of the founders of the Padang Regional People's Representative Council which was founded at the suggestion of Sukarno to reduce the impact of the war during the Japanese occupation of the Dutch East Indies.

Aboebakar Djaar was one of the founders of the Pancasila Law College, which became the forerunner of Faculty of Law, Andalas University. He died in Padang, Friday, March 22, 1985 from diabetes. His body was buried at Pandang City Hall after being handed over by the Governor of West Sumatra, Ir. Azwar Anas to the Mayor of Padang Syahrul Ujud, S.H. He was survived by his wife and three children.

Political offices
Preceded by New office	Mayor of Padang; 1945–1946	Succeeded by Bagindo Azizchan
