= Asrul =

Asrul is an Indonesian name. Notable people with the name include:

- Asrul Sani (1926–2004), Indonesian writer
- Rafli Asrul (born 2003), Indonesian footballer
