= Adityawarman Museum =

- Museum Adityawarman
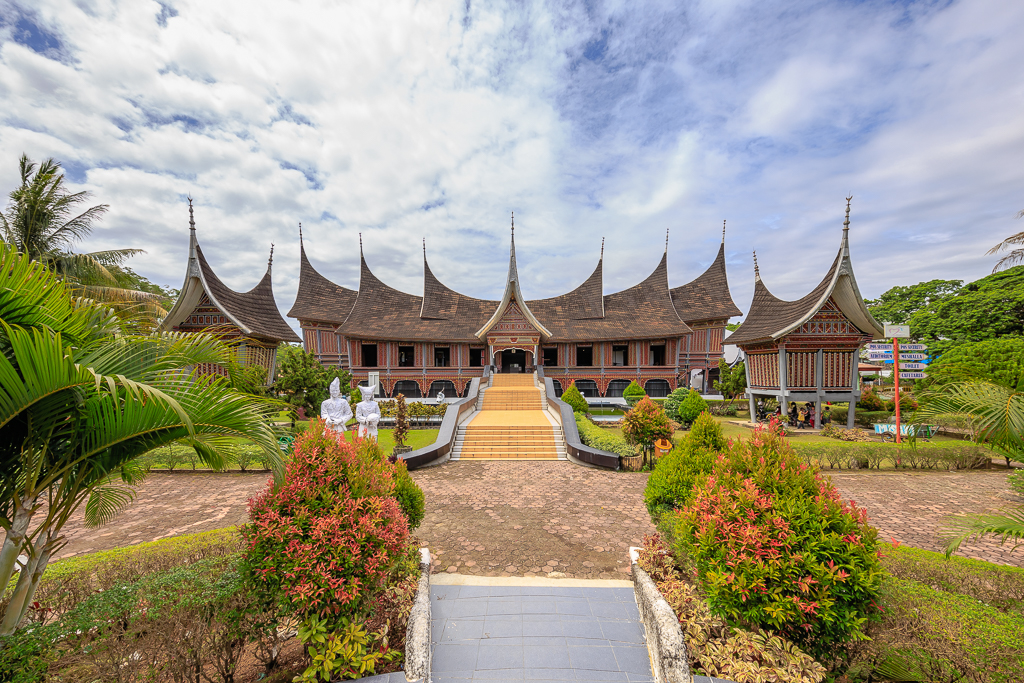
- Adityawarman Museum in the shape of a rumah gadang
- Established: 16 March 1977
- Location: Jalan Diponegoro 10, Padang, Indonesia
- Coordinates: 0.955274°S 100.355817°E
- Type: Ethnographic museum
- Collection size: 5,781 (2006)
- Owner: Government of West Sumatra
- Website: museumadityawarman.sumbarprov.go.id

Adityawarman Museum is a State Museum (Museum Negeri) located in Padang, Western Sumatra. As a State Museum, Adityawarman Museum is officially known as the State Museum of West Sumatra (Museum Negeri Sumatera Barat). The museum displays ethnographic collections of items related to the culture of the Province of West Sumatra, particularly the culture of Minangkabau and Mentawai.

== History ==
The idea for a museum dedicated to the culture of West Sumatra was first proposed by Amir Ali, the Head of the Department of Education of Culture of the Province of West Sumatra. The original proposal was to build a "Minangkabau Culture Hall". The idea was proposed to the Governor of West Sumatra at that time, Harun Al Rasyid Zain. This idea was responded to positively by national authorities, so the construction of the State Museum for the Province of West Sumatra commenced.

Construction started in 1974 over a plot of land of about 2.6 hectares (6.4 acres). Construction took about 3 years. The museum was inaugurated on March 16, 1977, by the Ministry of Education and Culture of Indonesia at that time, Syarief Thayeb. On May 28, 1979, a State Museum was established under the name 'State Museum of West Sumatra' (Indonesian Museum Negeri Sumatera Barat) and was given the name Adityawarman. The name Adityawarman was derived from the 14th-century founder and ruler of Malayapura in the Minangkabau Highlands.

The proposal for the name Adityawarman was filled with controversy, especially among the West Sumatrans. Despite the important historic role of Adityawarman in bringing glory to the Minangkabau kingdom and the fact that he was a Minangkabau through the matrilineal order, Adityawarman's affiliation with the Javanese rulers rendered him controversial. One example of a controversy surrounding the name of Adityawarman was when the Minister of Education Mohammad Yamin wanted to give the name to a university in West Sumatra, but the people rejected the name and changed it to Andalas University in 1956. In 1975, Governor Harun Zain refused to allow the museum to be called Adityawarman Museum. However, his refusal was reversed by Azwar Anas, his successor.

Following the regional autonomy scheme in Indonesia, in 2001 the management of the museum was transferred to the West Sumatran Regional Government, directly under the Department of Culture and Tourism of West Sumatera Province.

The museum was damaged in the Padang earthquake. More than 80% of the museum's collection was destroyed.

== Building ==
The museum is housed in a traditional Minangkabau building known as the Rumah Gadang. Two rangkiangs (Minangkabau rice granaries) flank the museum at the front yard.

== Collection ==
The museum houses historic and cultural objects found in the province of West Sumatra, especially those related to the culture and history of Minangkabau and Mentawai. As of 2006, the museum houses 5,781 items. The most notable collection in the Adityawarman Museum are relics from the time of the 11th-century Malay-Buddhist kingdom of Dharmasraya, e.g. duplicates of the statue of Bhairawa and Amoghapasa inscription (the original is kept in the National Museum).

== See also ==
- List of museums and cultural institutions in Indonesia

== Cited works ==
- Kahin, Audrey (1999). Rebellion to Integration: West Sumatra and the Indonesian Polity, 1926-1998. Amsterdam: Amsterdam University Press. ISBN 9789053563953.
