= Hendri Septa =

Indonesian politician (born 1976)

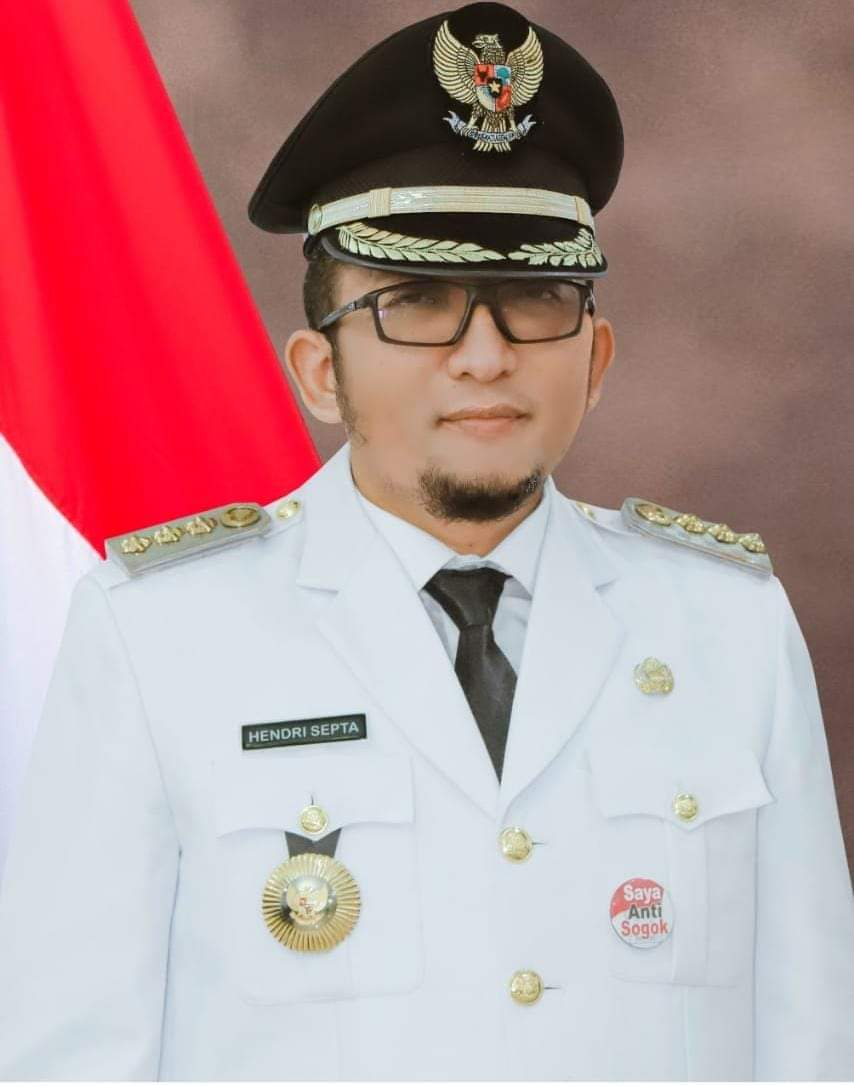
- Official portrait

14th Mayor of Padang
- In office 7 April 2021 – 13 May 2024
- Preceded by: Mahyeldi Ansharullah
- Succeeded by: Andree Algamar (acting); Fadly Amran

Vice Mayor of Padang
- In office 13 May 2019 – 25 February 2021
- Preceded by: Emzalmi
- Succeeded by: Ekos Albar

Member of Padang DPRD
- In office 7 August 2009 – 7 August 2014

Personal details
- Born: 6 September 1976 (age 48); Padang, West Sumatra, Indonesia
- Political party: National Mandate Party

Hendri Septa (born 6 September 1976) is an Indonesian politician of the National Mandate Party who is the mayor of Padang, West Sumatra since 2021 until 2024. Having previously been the vice mayor of Mahyeldi Ansharullah, Septa became mayor when Mahyeldi was elected as governor of West Sumatra.

== Early life ==
Hendri Septa was born in Padang on 6 September 1976. His father, Muhammad Asli Chaidir, is a politician who has served in the West Sumatra Regional House of Representatives (DPRD) and in the national House of Representatives (DPR). After graduating from high school in Padang, he moved to Australia for studies, receiving a diploma in accounting from Swinburne University of Technology, a bachelors in accounting from Central Queensland University, and a masters in international business from Deakin University.

== Career ==
After returning from his studies, Septa joined the National Mandate Party (PAN) and took part in the 2009 legislative election, winning a seat in the Padang City Regional House of Representatives. He ran as a candidate for the Provincial DPRD in the 2014 election as a PAN candidate representing Padang, but did not win a seat.

In the 2018 mayoral election for Padang, Septa became the running mate of incumbent mayor Mahyeldi Ansharullah, with the pair being endorsed by PAN and the Prosperous Justice Party. The pair secured 212,156 votes (62.5%), defeating Mahyeldi's former vice mayor Emzalmi. Septa was sworn in as vice mayor on 13 May 2019.

=== As mayor ===
Starting on 25 January 2021, Septa became the acting mayor of Padang, as Mahyeldi was elected as the governor of West Sumatra in the 2020 gubernatorial election. He was also acting mayor during the campaigning period for the election, as Mahyeldi took a leave. Septa was inaugurated as full mayor on 7 April 2021 by Mahyeldi.

During Septa's tenure as mayor, the city government built additional classrooms for schools in the city and added two additional corridors to the Trans Padang bus line.

== Family ==
Septa is married to Genny Putrinda, daughter of West Sumatran politician Leonardy Harmainy. The couple has two children.
