= Algemene middelbare school =

Coordinates: 5.80933°N 55.18575°W

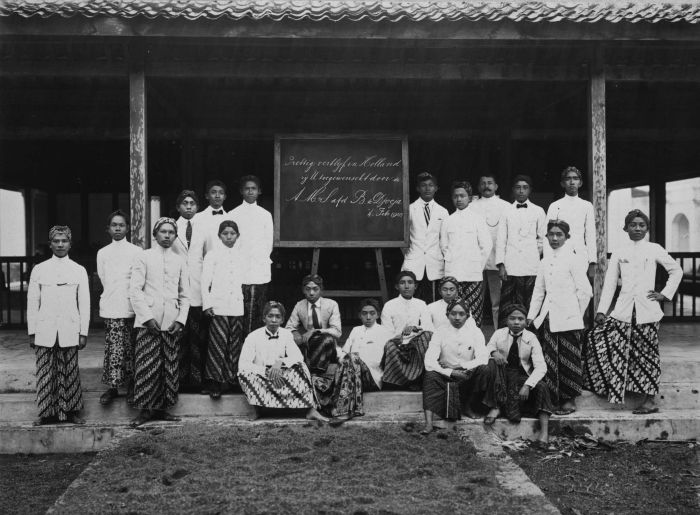
Portrait of the AMS students Section B Yogyakarta to mark the departure of G.A.J. Hazeu back to the Netherlands in 1920

Algemene middelbare school or AMS (Dutch, "general secondary school") was during part of the twentieth century a level of education in the Netherlands (and also the Dutch East Indies and Suriname), comparable with the high school level in the US education system. Its successors were the mavo and vbo, now both replaced by vmbo.

== See also ==
- Education in the Netherlands
