= Padang =

Capital and largest city of West Sumatra, Indonesia

- City
- City of Padang; Kota Padang
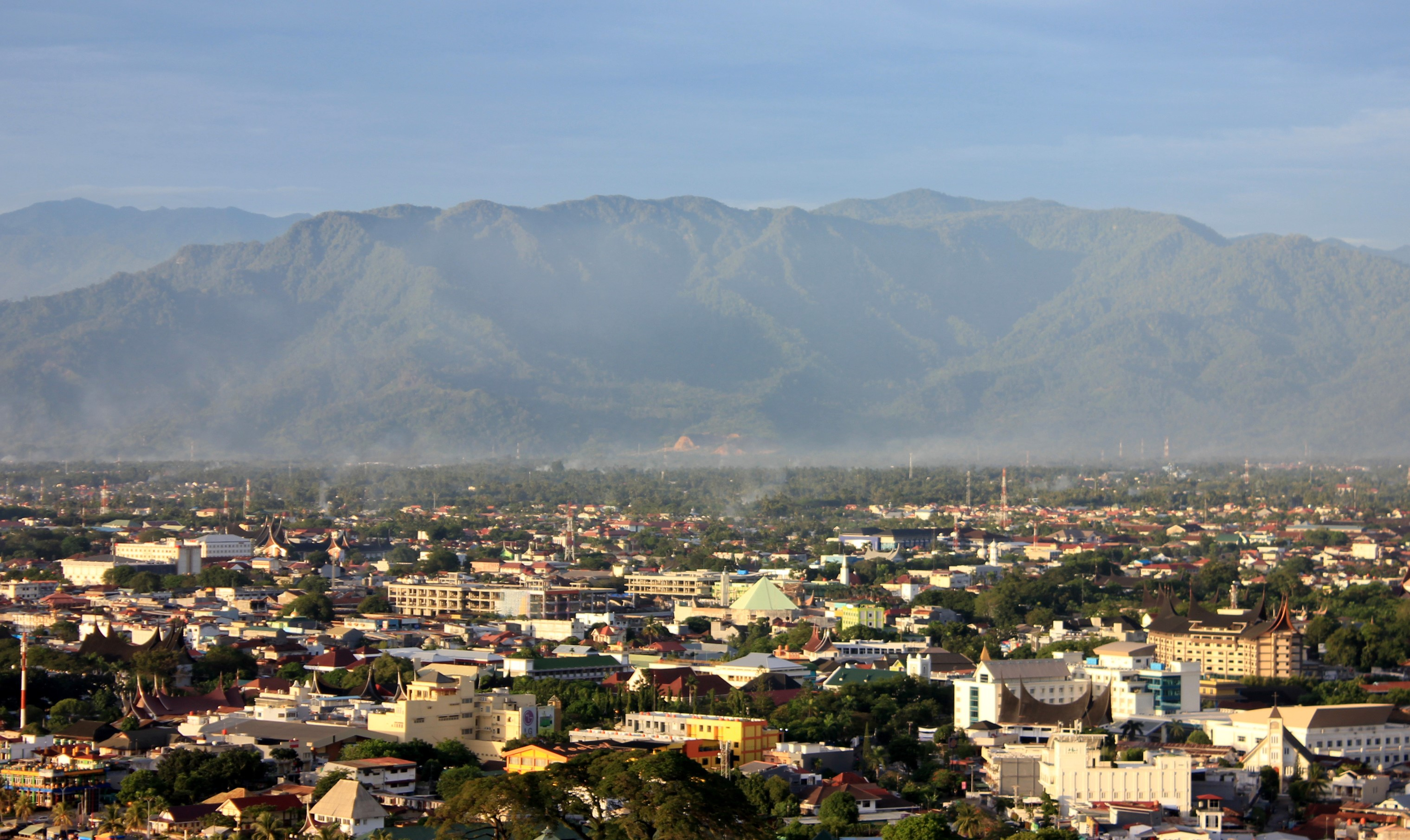
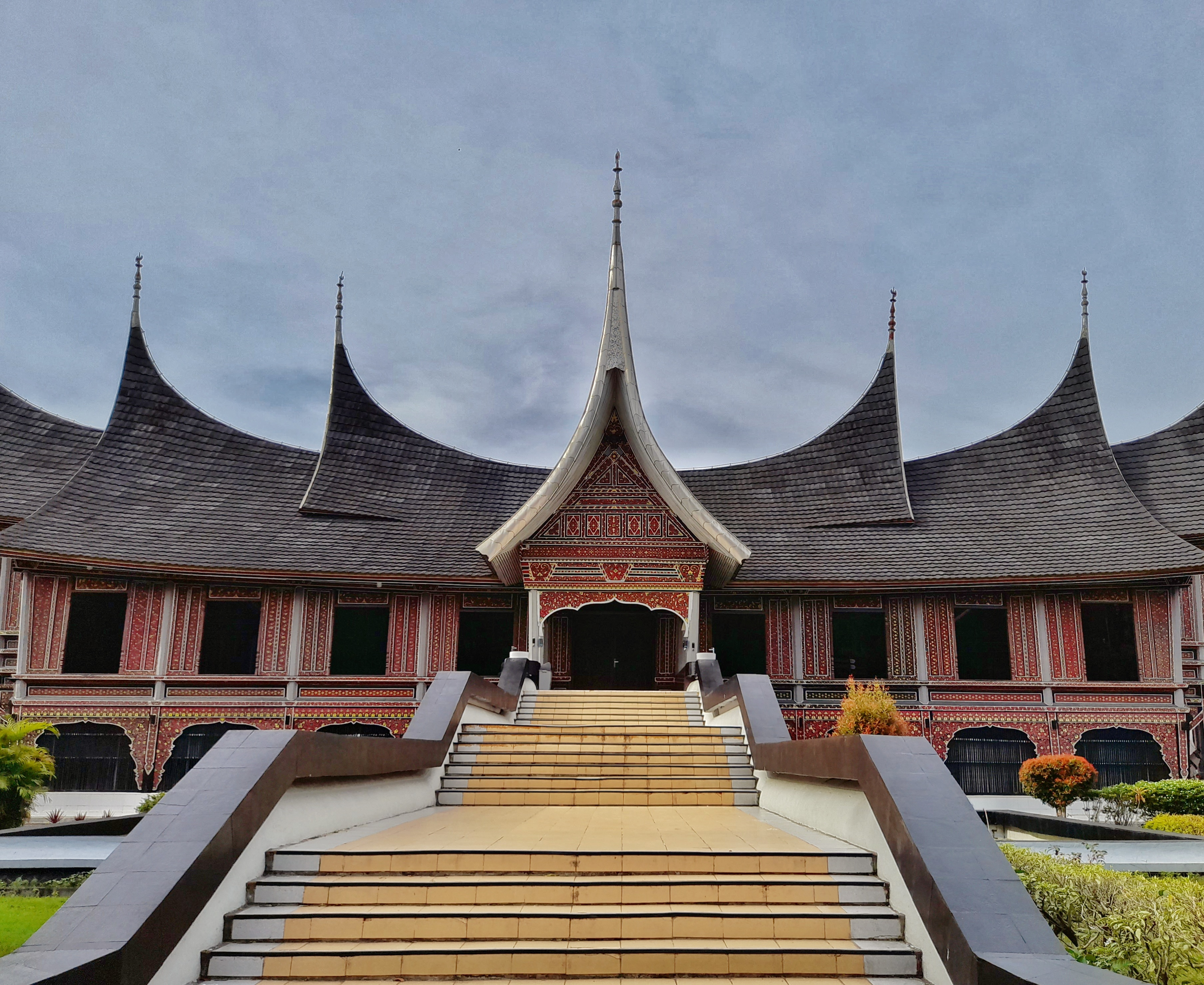
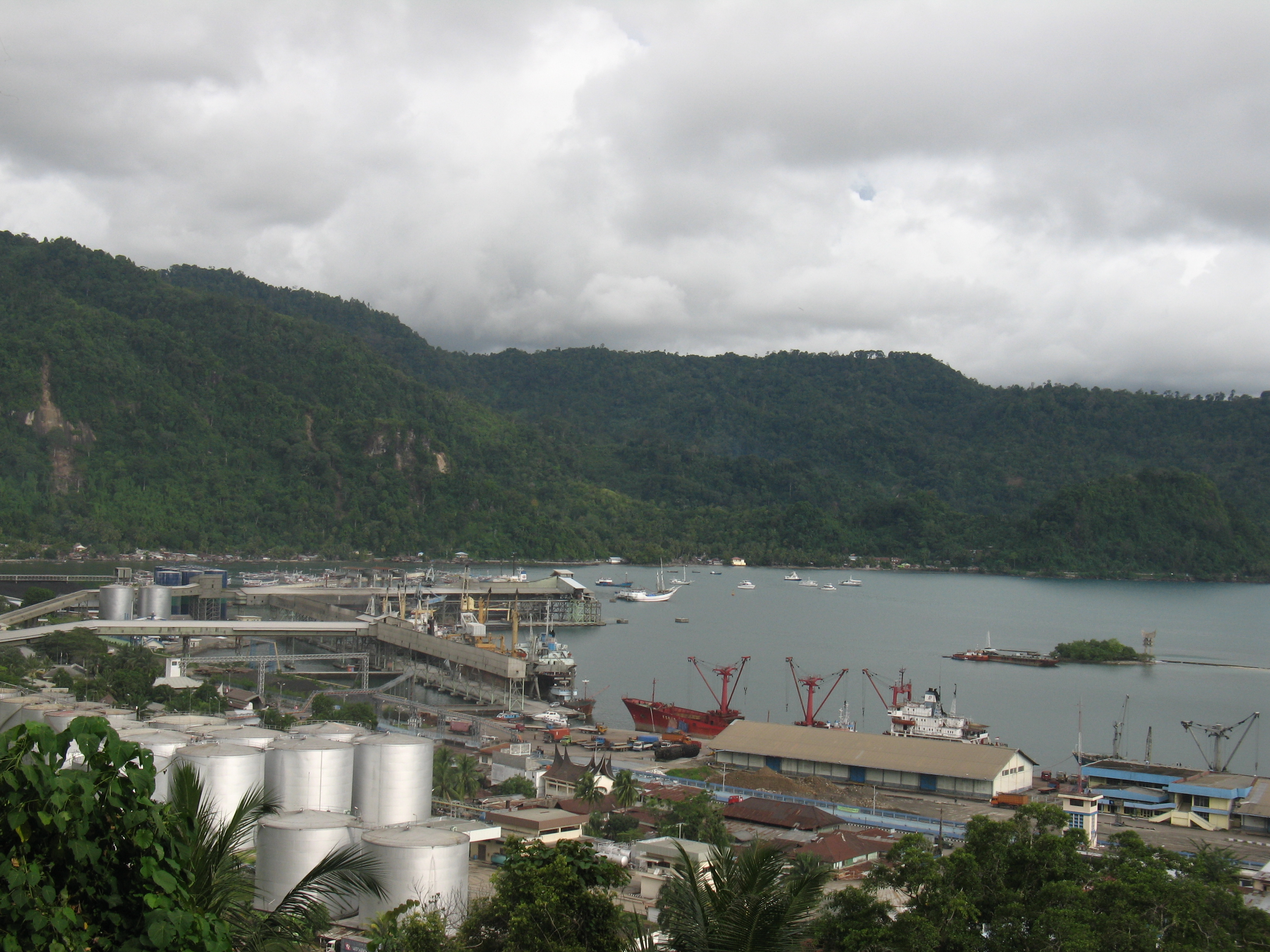
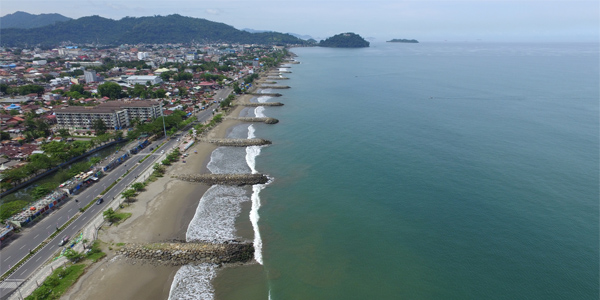
- Padang skyline Adityawarman Museum Port of Teluk Bayur Grand Mosque of West Sumatra Padang Beach

- Seal
- Motto: Padang Kota Tercinta "Padang, a Lovely City"
- Location within West Sumatra
- Interactive map of Padang
- Location in Sumatra and Indonesia Padang (Indonesia)
- Coordinates: 0°57′0″S 100°21′11″E
- Country: Indonesia
- Province: West Sumatra
- Founded: 7 August 1669
- Incorporated: 1 April 1906

Government
  - Mayor: Fadly Amran (NasDem)
  - Vice mayor: Maigus Nasir
  - Legislature: Padang City Regional House of Representatives

Area
  - Total: 694.96 km^{2} (268.33 sq mi)
- Elevation: 0–1,853 m (0–6,079 ft)

Population (mid 2025 estimate)
  - Total: 965,050
  - Density: 1,388.6/km^{2} (3,596.6/sq mi)
- Demonym: Padangnese
- Time zone: UTC+7 (WIB)
- Area code: +62 751
- HDI (2024): ▲0.839 (12th) very high
- Website: padang.go.id

Padang (Indonesian pronunciation: [ˈpadaŋ]) is the capital and largest city of the Indonesian province of West Sumatra. It had a population of 833,562 at the 2010 census and 909,040 at the 2020 census; the official estimate as of mid 2025 was 965,050. It is the 16th most populous city in Indonesia and the most populous city on the west coast of Sumatra. The Padang metropolitan area is the third most populous metropolitan area in Sumatra with a population of over 1.7 million. Padang is widely known for its Minangkabau culture, cuisine, and sunset beaches.

The city had historically been a trading center since the pre-colonial era, in both pepper and gold. The Dutch made contact with the city in the mid-17th century, eventually constructing a fortress and taking over control of the city from the Pagaruyung Kingdom. Save for several interruptions of British rule, Padang remained part of the Dutch East Indies as one of its major cities until Indonesian independence. In 1906, Padang, along with Palembang, became the first populated places in Sumatra to achieve city status (gemeente).

== History ==
Historical affiliations

Dutch East India (1663–1781)
British Empire (1781–1784)
Dutch East India (1784–1795)
(United Kingdom) British Empire (1795–1819)
(Netherlands) Dutch East Indies (1819–1942)
Japanese occupation (1942–1945)
Republic of Indonesia (1945–present)

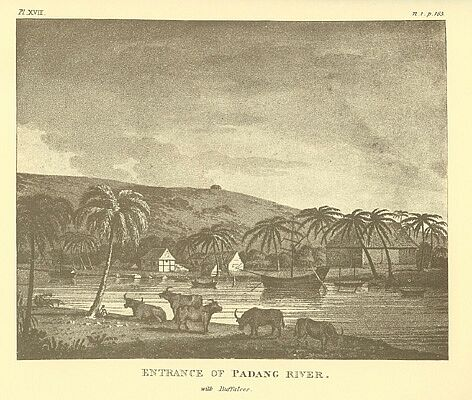
Padang circa 1795

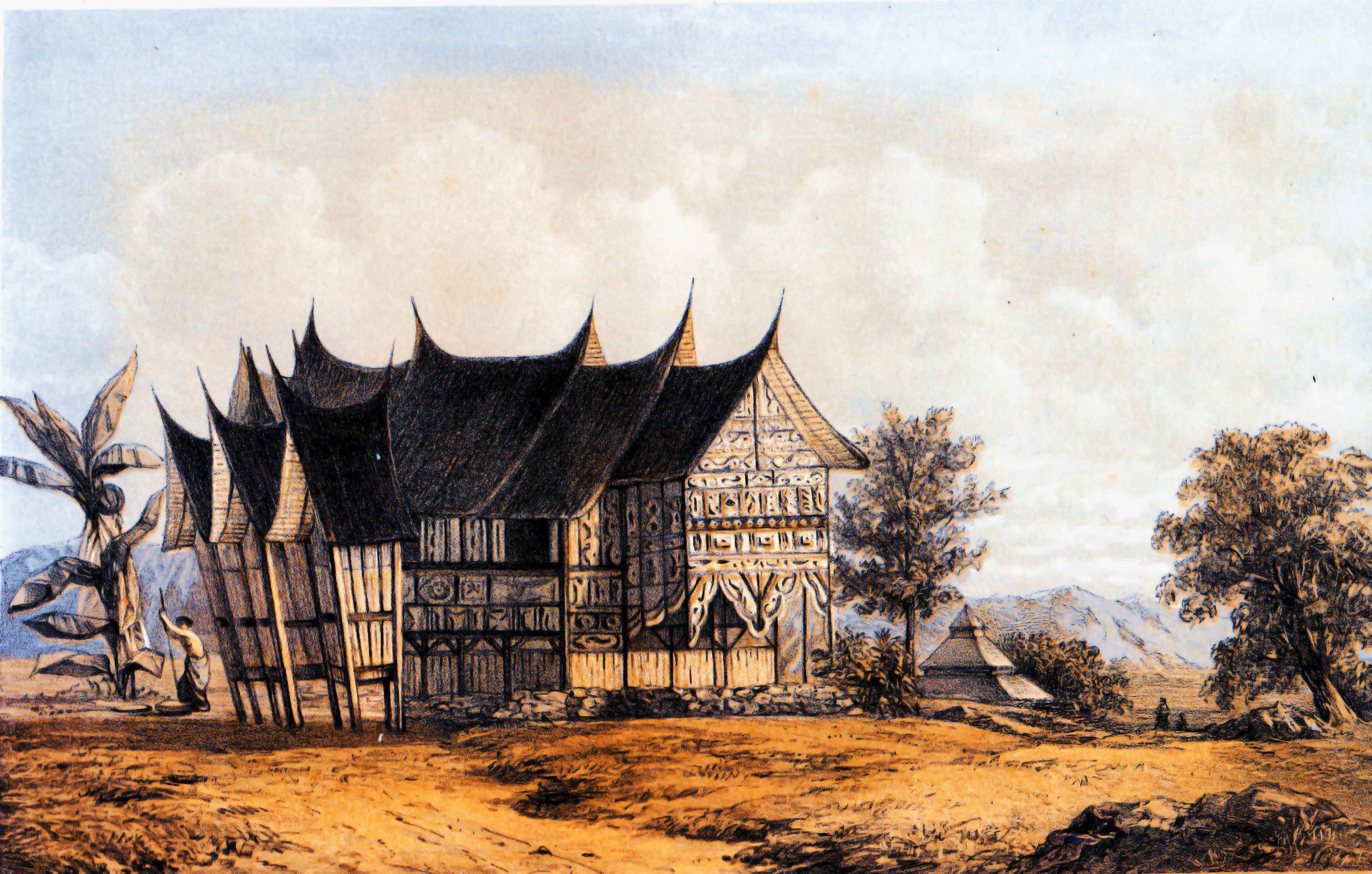
Padang, 1859

Padang has been a trade centre since the 16th century, having been controlled by the Pagaruyung Kingdom and the Aceh Sultanate. During the 16th and 17th centuries, pepper was cultivated and traded with India, Portugal, the United Kingdom, and the Netherlands. In 1663, the city came under the authority of the Dutch and a trading post was built in 1680. The city came under the British Empire twice, firstly from 1781 to 1784 during the Fourth Anglo-Dutch War and again from 1795 to 1819 during the Napoleonic Wars. In 1819 the city was transferred back to the Netherlands. Up to circa 1780 the most important trade product was gold originating from gold mines in the region. When the mines were exhausted, the focus turned to other products such as coffee, salts, and textiles.

In 1797 Padang was inundated by a tsunami with an estimated flow depth of 5–10 metres, following an earthquake, estimated to be 8.5–8.7 M_{w}, which occurred off the coast. The shaking caused considerable damage and the deaths of two people, while the tsunami resulted in several houses being washed away and several deaths at the village of Air Manis. Boats moored in the Arau river ended up on dry land, including a 200-ton sailing ship which was deposited about 1 km (0.62 mi) upstream. In 1833, another tsunami inundated Padang with an estimated flow depth of 3–4 m (9.8–13.1 ft) as a result of an earthquake, estimated to be 8.6–8.9 M_{w}, which occurred off Bengkulu. The shaking caused considerable damage in Padang, and due to the tsunami boats moored in the Arau river broke their anchors and were scattered.

In 1837, the Dutch East Indies government made Padang the seat of government of the West Coast of Sumatra (Sumatra's Westkust) which included present-day West Sumatra and Tapanuli. Subsequently the city became a gemeente area since 1 April 1906 after the issuance of an ordinance (STAL 1906 No.151) on 1 March 1906. Until World War II, Padang was one of the five largest port cities in Indonesia, apart from Jakarta, Surabaya, Medan, and Makassar.

Coat of Arms of Padang during Dutch colonial era, granted in 1926

The population of Padang in 1920 was 28,754, making it the second largest city in Sumatra after Palembang. At the time of independence in the 1940s, the city had around 50,000 inhabitants. Coffee was still important, but copra was also a major item produced by farmers in its hinterland. Since then, the population growth has been partly a result of growth in the area of the city, but largely a result of the migration to major cities seen in so many developing nations. From 1950 the Ombilin coal field developed with Padang as its outlet port. This was seen by some observers as reflecting the economic and political colonisation of Indonesia.

Upon the entry of the Japanese army on 17 March 1942, Padang was abandoned by the Dutch due to their panic. At the same time, Sukarno was detained in the city because the Dutch at that time wanted to take him with them to escape to Australia. Then the commander of the Japanese Army for Sumatra met him to negotiate the fate of Indonesia. After the Japanese were able to control the situation, the city was then used as an administrative city for development and public works during their occupation of West Sumatra.

On 30 September 2009, a 7.9 magnitude earthquake hit about 50 km (31 mi) off the coast of Padang. There were more than 1,100 fatalities, 313 of which occurred within Padang.

== Geography ==
The city of Padang is located on the west coast of the island of Sumatra, with a total area of 694.96 km^{2} (268.33 sq mi), equivalent to 1.65% of the area of West Sumatra. More than 60% of the area of Padang is in the form of hills covered by protection forests. Only around 205 km^{2} (79 sq mi) of the territory is considered urban. The hills stretch in the east and south of the city. The notable hills in Padang include Lampu Hill, Mount Padang, Gado-Gado Hill, and Pegambiran Hill. The city of Padang has a coastline of 68 km (42 mi) on the mainland of Sumatra.

In addition, there are also 19 small islands within the city limits, including Bintangur Island with an area of 56.78 ha (140.3 acres), Sikuai Island with an area of 48.12 ha (118.9 acres) and 9 even smaller islands within Bungus Teluk Kabung District; Toran Island covering 33.67 ha (83.2 acres), Pisang Gadang Island with an area of 26.19 ha (64.7 acres), Pandan Island with an area of 24.32 ha (60.1 acres) and 2 smaller islands within Padang Selatan District; and 2 smaller islands within Koto Tangah District.

=== Climate ===
Padang features a tropical rainforest climate under Köppen's climate classification. Since this tropical rainforest climate is more subject to the Intertropical Convergence Zone than the trade winds and cyclones are very rare, it is equatorial. Padang is one of Indonesia's wettest cities, with frequent rainfall throughout the course of the year. The city averages roughly 4,300 mm (170 in) of rain per year. Padang's driest month is February, where 250 mm (9.8 in) of precipitation on average is observed. The city temperatures are relatively constant throughout the year, with an average of 26 °C (79 °F). Padang has 21 rivers, with the longest being Batang Kandis with a length of 20 km (12 mi). In 1980 two-thirds of the city was flooded because the city's drainage which primarily empties to Batang Arau could not contain the water.

Climate data for Padang
| Month | Jan | Feb | Mar | Apr | May | Jun | Jul | Aug | Sep | Oct | Nov | Dec | Year |
|---|---|---|---|---|---|---|---|---|---|---|---|---|---|
| Mean daily maximum °C (°F) | 30.6 (87.1) | 31.7 (89.1) | 31.7 (89.1) | 31.7 (89.1) | 32.2 (90.0) | 32.2 (90.0) | 31.7 (89.1) | 32.2 (90.0) | 32.2 (90.0) | 31.7 (89.1) | 31.1 (88.0) | 30.6 (87.1) | 31.6 (88.9) |
| Daily mean °C (°F) | 27.0 (80.6) | 27.0 (80.6) | 27.0 (80.6) | 27.2 (81.0) | 27.5 (81.5) | 27.0 (80.6) | 25.0 (77.0) | 25.0 (77.0) | 26.7 (80.1) | 26.7 (80.1) | 26.7 (80.1) | 26.7 (80.1) | 26.6 (79.9) |
| Mean daily minimum °C (°F) | 23.3 (73.9) | 24.4 (75.9) | 23.9 (75.0) | 23.9 (75.0) | 23.9 (75.0) | 23.9 (75.0) | 23.3 (73.9) | 23.3 (73.9) | 23.9 (75.0) | 23.9 (75.0) | 23.9 (75.0) | 23.9 (75.0) | 23.8 (74.8) |
| Average precipitation mm (inches) | 351 (13.8) | 259 (10.2) | 307 (12.1) | 363 (14.3) | 315 (12.4) | 307 (12.1) | 277 (10.9) | 348 (13.7) | 352 (13.9) | 495 (19.5) | 518 (20.4) | 480 (18.9) | 4,172 (164.3) |
| Mean monthly sunshine hours | 175 | 181 | 175 | 188 | 200 | 206 | 200 | 186 | 136 | 135 | 167 | 167 | 2,116 |
Source 1: Sistema de Clasificación Bioclimática Mundial
Source 2: Deutscher Wetterdienst (sun, 1961–1990) (Note: Station ID for Mia Padang is 96163 Use this station ID to locate the sunshine duration)

== Governance ==
By 2007 the city government began a number of religiously motivated policies. One requires females of all religious backgrounds who are municipal employees and students in government schools to wear jilbab (hijab), and high school students now take classes on reading the Qur'an. Municipal employees are required to pay zakat.

=== Administrative districts ===
Map showing the 11 districts of Padang

Historical population
| Year | Pop. | ±% |
|---|---|---|
| 1819 | 8,500 | — |
| 1874 | 25,000 | +194.1% |
| 1920 | 28,754 | +15.0% |
| 1930 | 40,744 | +41.7% |
| 1961 | 143,699 | +252.7% |
| 1971 | 350,277 | +143.8% |
| 1980 | 480,922 | +37.3% |
| 1990 | 631,263 | +31.3% |
| 2010 | 833,562 | +32.0% |
| 2020 | 909,040 | +9.1% |
| 2025 | 965,050 | +6.2% |

The city of Padang is divided into eleven districts (kecamatan), listed below with their areas and their populations at the 2010 Census and the 2020 Census together with the official estimates as of mid 2025. The table also includes the locations of the district administrative centres, the number of administrative urban villages (kelurahan) in each district, and its post codes.

| Name of District (kecamatan) | Area in km^{2} | Pop'n 2010 Census | Pop'n 2020 Census | Pop'n mid 2025 estimate | Admin centre | No. of villages | Post codes |
|---|---|---|---|---|---|---|---|
| Bungus Teluk Kabung | 100.78 | 22,896 | 27,408 | 29,700 | Pasar Laban | 6 | 25237 |
| Lubuk Kilangan | 85.99 | 48,850 | 57,489 | 62,700 | Bandar Buat | 7 | 25231 - 25237 |
| Lubuk Begalung | 30.91 | 106,432 | 122,593 | 132,320 | Lubuk Begalung | 15 | 25221 - 25227 |
| Padang Selatan | 10.03 | 57,718 | 60,996 | 63,150 | Mata Air | 12 | 25211 - 25217 |
| Padang Timur | 8.15 | 77,868 | 77,755 | 78,730 | Simpang Haru | 10 | 25121 - 25129 |
| Padang Barat | 7.00 | 45,380 | 42,957 | 43,300 | Purus | 10 | 25111 - 25119 |
| Padang Utara | 8.08 | 69,119 | 55,171 | 55,610 | Lolong Belanti | 7 | 25132 - 25139 |
| Nanggalo | 8.07 | 57,275 | 58,535 | 59,630 | Surau Gadang | 6 | 25142 - 25147 |
| Kuranji | 57.41 | 126,729 | 146,111 | 157,780 | Pasar Ambacang | 9 | 25151 - 25159 |
| Pauh | 146.29 | 59,216 | 62,228 | 64,250 | Pasar Baru | 9 | 25161 - 25168 |
| Koto Tangah | 232.25 | 162,079 | 197,797 | 217,870 | Lubuk Buaya | 13 | 25171 - 25176 |
| Totals | 694.96 | 833,562 | 909,040 | 965,050 | | 104 | |

=== Adipura award ===
As of 2017, Padang had received the "Adipura" (cleanest and greenest city) award in the category of large city 18 times and the "Adipura Kencana" award three times.

== Culture ==
=== Cuisine ===
The cuisine of the Minangkabau people is commonly called Padang cuisine. Padang restaurants are common throughout the country and are famous for their spicy food. Padang food is usually cooked once per day, and all customers choose from those dishes, which are left out on display until no food is left. It is served in small portions of various dishes, but constituting, with rice, a complete meal. Customers take – and pay for – only what they want from this array of dishes. The best known Padang dish is rendang, a spicy meat stew. Soto Padang (crispy beef in spicy soup) is local residents' breakfast favourite, meanwhile sate (beef satay in curry sauce served with ketupat) is a treat in the evening.

== Tourism ==
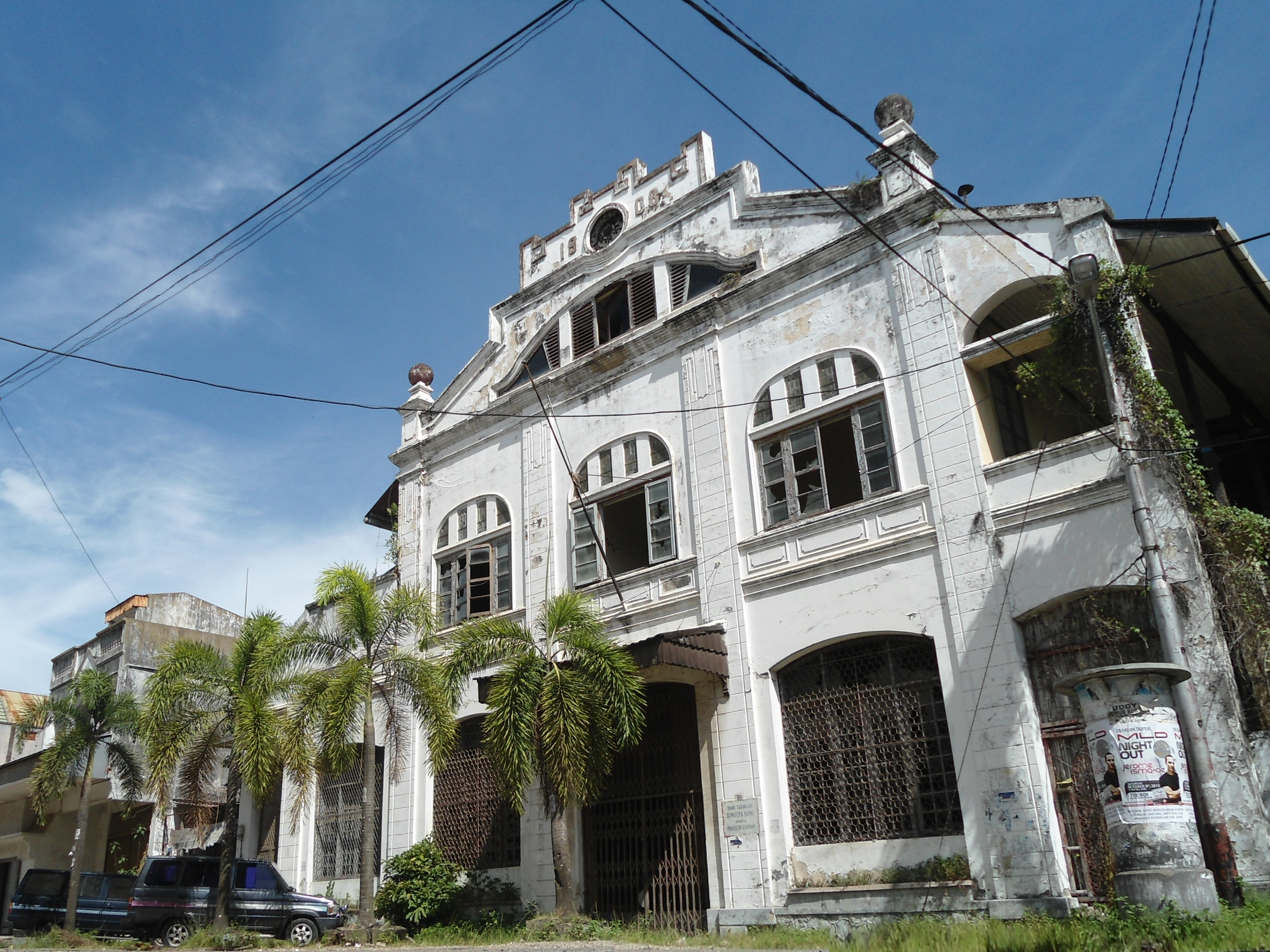
Padangsche Spaarbank building in Padang old city

Padang is a common transit point for surfers travelling to Batu Islands and Mentawai Islands, and for tourists visiting the West Sumatran highlands. Padang Beach (known as Taplau or Tapi Lauik), stretching from Samudra Street until Puruih, is known for its sunsets and food stalls. The Kuranji River flows in Padang and on the northern area of the river at Batu Busuk, Lambung Bukit sub-district, white water activities are quite popular. Bungus Bay, to the south of Padang, is suitable for swimming and boating. There are some offshore islands near Bungus, such as Sikuai island and Pagang Island.

Currently, the Regional Development Planning Board (Bappeda) of Padang has established development plans for "Padang Old City" in Kampung Pondok, South Padang district as a tourist area. The mayor of Padang has designated 73 historic buildings as cultural heritage sites of Padang.

=== Landmarks ===
The iconic Grand Mosque of West Sumatra, a new modern gigantic mosque that is built with Minangkabau architecture.

There are many old buildings in Padang that still retain their Dutch and Chinese architecture. The old city of Padang, located next to Muaro Harbor on the Arau River, formerly functioned as the city's main commercial avenue. The old city was the former business district of Padang, with many important buildings such as Padang City Hall, De Javasche bank (present-day Bank Indonesia), Nederlandsche Spaarbank, Geo Wehry & Co, Escompto Maatschappij Office, warehouses, and merchant houses.

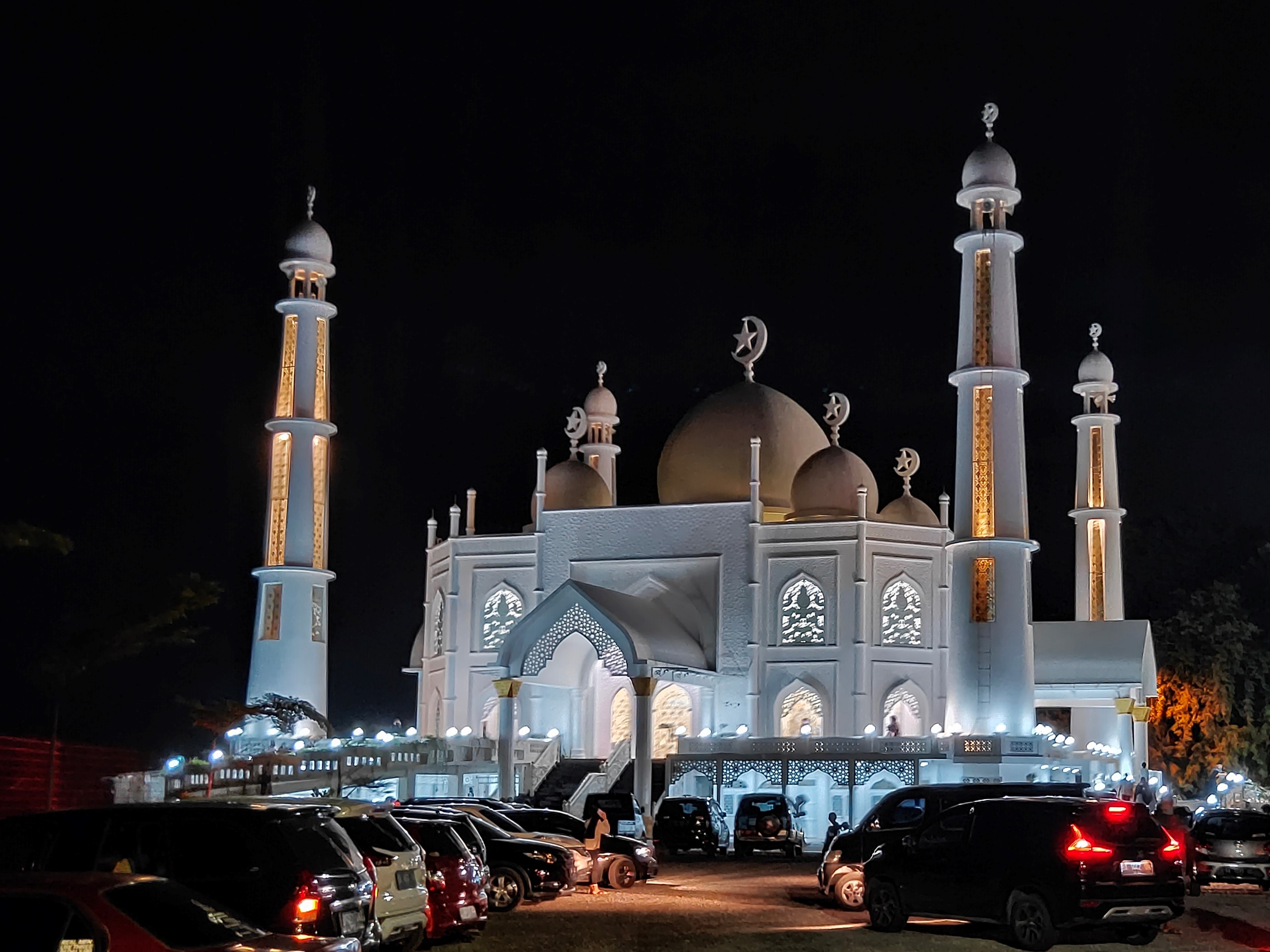
Al-Hakim Mosque on the oceanfront of central Padang

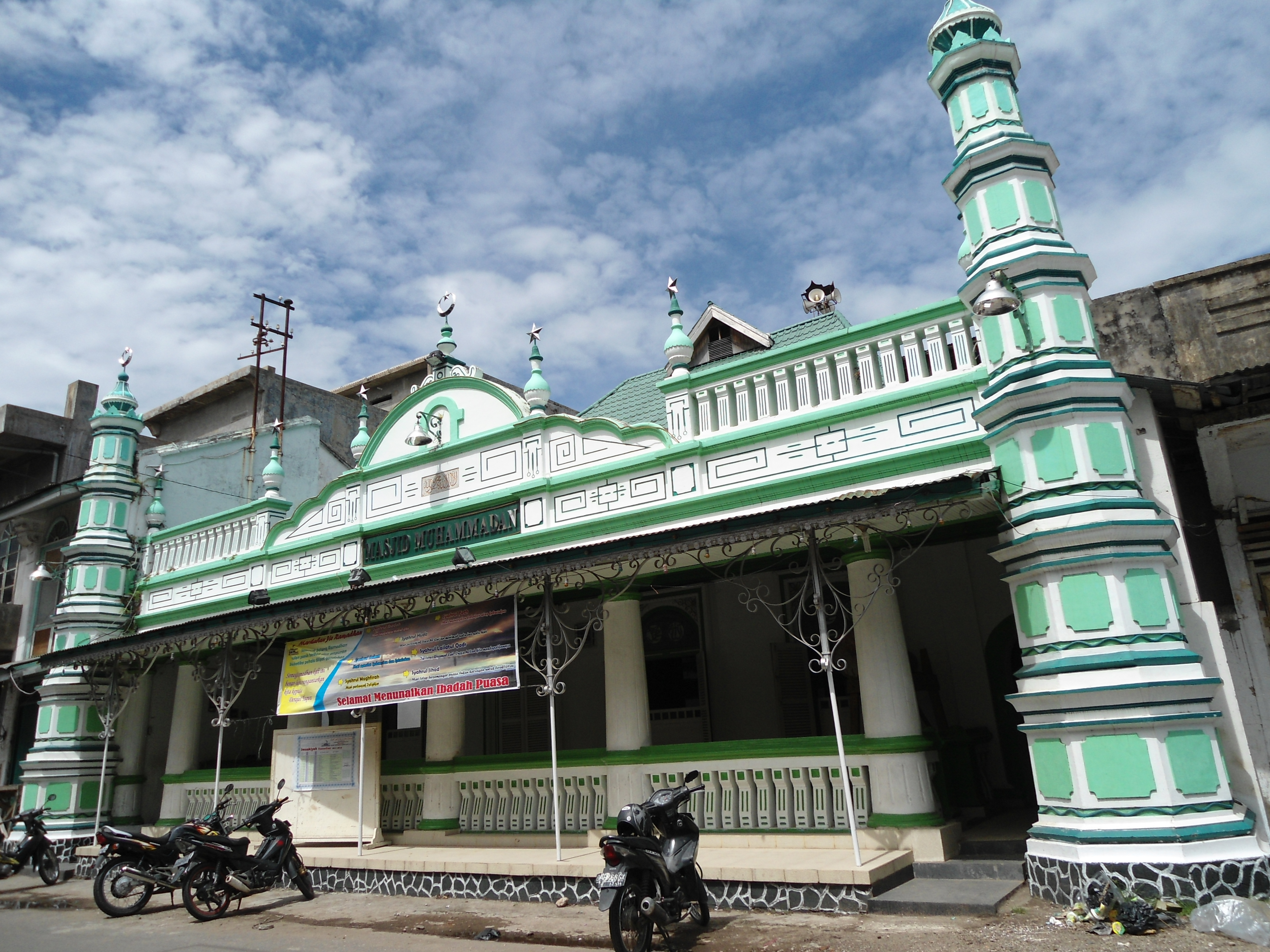
Masjid Muhammadan, a historic mosque in Padang

There are several historic places such as Adityawarman Museum which specialises in the history and culture of the local Minangkabau ethnic group, and the main exhibits are housed within a Rumah Gadang style building. Grand Mosque of West Sumatra, a new modern large mosque, is built according to traditional Minangkabau architecture. The mosque is located on Jalan Khatib Sulaiman, near the city centre of Padang. Ganting Grand Mosque, the oldest mosque in Padang and one of the oldest in Indonesia, is a popular tourist attraction. Padang Beach contains Al-Hakim Mosque, and Muhammadan Mosque, founded by Indian merchants, is also located in the city centre. St. Leo Monastery, featuring a mixture of traditional Minang architecture on its bell tower roofing and Dutch architecture on the church building, is one of the oldest churches in Padang. Along the beachside road, just down from the Tourist Information Office is a Buddhist temple, Vihara Buddha Warman, opened in 2006 for the large Chinese Buddhist community.

=== Beaches and parks ===
Air Manis Beach is located 10 km (6.2 mi) south of Padang, location of the legendary Malin Kundang Stone. The rock formations which are found there resemble ship wrecks. Across from the Arau River is the Siti Nurbaya Park, which can be reached by bridge or boat. There are still remains of Japanese cannons and bunkers from World War II. There are also great views of Padang City, Arau River and the Indian Ocean visible from the park. Bung Hatta Nature Reserve (Taman Hutan Raya Bung Hatta) is situated 18 km (11 mi) east of the city, with diverse flora and fauna including a few Sumatran tigers, tapirs, wild goats, bears, as well as Raflesia Gaduansi, Balangphora and Amorphopalus.

== Sports ==
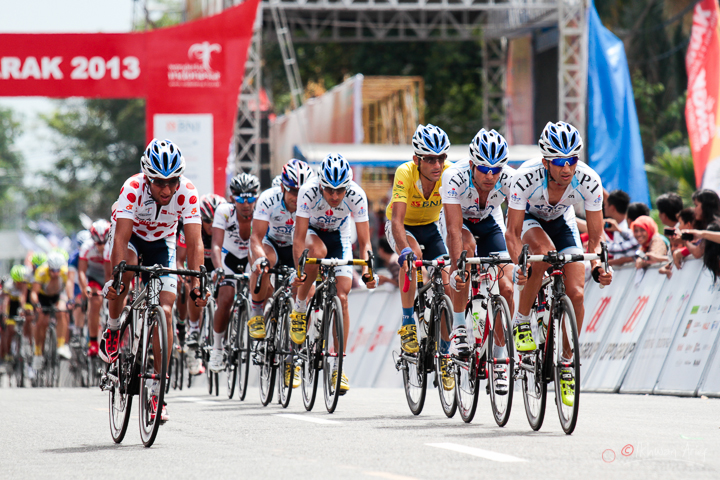
Tour de Singkarak 2013 in Padang, Indonesia

Padang is the hometown of the football team Semen Padang, with Haji Agus Salim Stadium being the home stadium of the club. Padang is also home to an annual international professional bicycle racing competition—Tour de Singkarak—and once hosted the Fourth International Traditional (Dragonboat) Festival.

== Media ==
The oldest newspaper in the Padang region is Harian Haluan. Several other newspapers such as Padang Ekspres and Pos Metro Padang are also widely available.

The privately owned Padang TV is the most popular local TV station based in Padang. The public TVRI West Sumatra is also broadcast in the city.

== Infrastructure ==
=== Public transport ===
The TransPadang bus rapid transit service was developed using Jakarta's TransJakarta system as a model, but without dedicated lanes and comfortable shelters. Today Trans Padang runs only from Lubuk Buaya to Pasar Raya, a distance of 18 km (11 mi), with a fleet of 10 large buses (capacity 60) and 15 medium buses (capacity 40). Current daily passengers reach up to 7,000 people, an increase from the initial ridership of 4,000. The load factor is 128% in the morning and evening rush hours.

=== Airport ===
The city is served by Minangkabau International Airport in Ketaping, Padang Pariaman. It replaced Tabing Airport, which became a military base. Minangkabau's terminal building serves international and domestic flights. The airport has 4 aerobridges, 17 check-in counters, 5 baggage conveyors, and 9 ticket sales counters. In late 2013, the runway was lengthened by 250 metres so that it could accommodate Boeing 747 and Airbus A340 planes. There is also a connection from the airport to the city center with a train service. A terminal expansion (Phase II) has been announced with the rendering already released on the Angkasa Pura 2 website.

=== Seaport ===
Padang's Teluk Bayur harbour (the former Emmahaven Port) is the largest and busiest harbour on the west coast of Sumatra. It serves domestic as well as international routes. It was built in 1888 by the colonial government of the Netherlands. On 29 April 2013 a new container terminal was officially opened by the governor of West Sumatra which can hold more than 4,000 containers in a 46,886 m^{2} (504,680 sq ft) area. The port is the main gateway to the Mentawai islands, including Siberut, Sipora, and South Pagai. There are also ferry connections between Padang to Jakarta and Sibolga next to Gunung Sitoli (Nias).

=== Toll road ===
The administration of West Sumatra has secured land for the construction of a 28-kilometre (17 mi)-long toll road between Padang and Sicincin district with about Rp.1.3 trillion ($141.7 million) invested. It is a part of the Padang-Pekanbaru toll road with a total length of 244 km (152 mi). 80 percent of the land with a width of 30 metres has been acquired, but they will acquire more land to meet an ideal width of 50 metres. The construction project has officially begun in February 2018.

=== Railroad ===
Railroad tracks connect Padang to Pariaman to the north, Padangpanjang to the northeast, Solok and Sawahlunto to the east. The largest train station is Padang Station, also known as Simpang Haru station. Sibinuang and Dang Tuanku provide the trip services from Padang (Simpang Haru) to Pariaman and vice versa.

=== Tsunami shelter ===
Government and the people of Mount Pangilun has agreed to make Mount Pangilun as the primary tsunami shelter. Better road access to the hill will be built, as well as temporary shelters, including their many facilities.

== Education ==
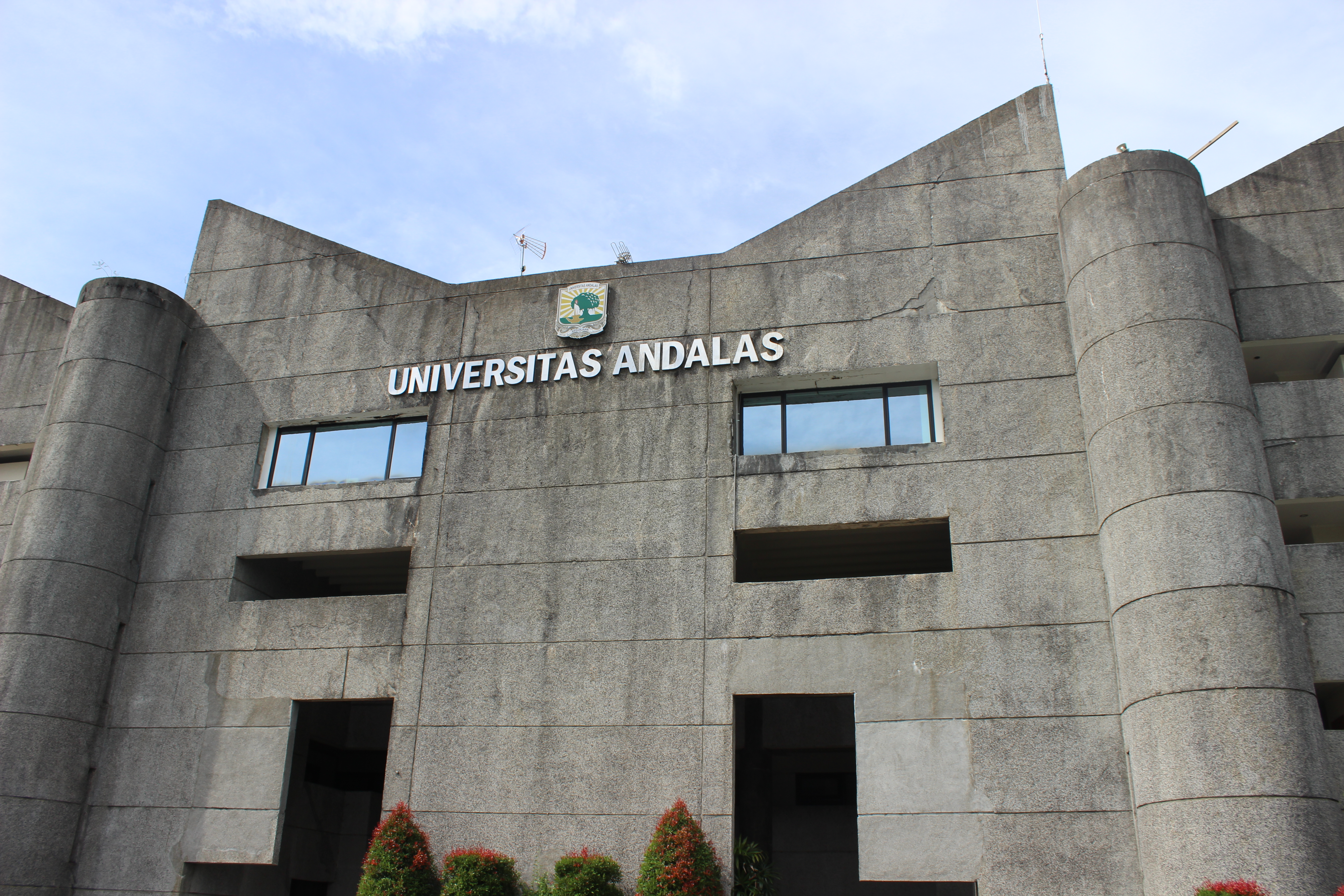
Andalas University rectorate campus

There are two institutes of higher education in Padang, i.e. Andalas University and the State University of Padang. Andalas University is the oldest university in Indonesia outside of Java. The main campus is located at Limau Manis, about 12 km (7.5 mi) from the centre of Padang. The Faculty of Medicine and Faculty of Dentistry are located in the city centre, near the M. Djamil Central General Hospital. Meanwhile, the State University of Padang is located in Air Tawar.

The other universities in Padang are:

- Baiturrahmah University in Air Pacah
- Bung Hatta University in Ulak Karang
- Ekasakti University
- Imam Bonjol State Islamic University
- Padang Technology Institute in Lapai
- Putra Indonesia YPTK University
- Tamansiswa University
- West Sumatra Muhammadiyah University

| Formal education | Elementary School (SD) or Madrasah Ibtidaiyah (MI) | Junior High (SMP) or Madrasah Tsanawiyah (MTs) | Senior High (SMA) or Madrasah Aliyah (MA) | Vocational High School (SMK) | College or University |
|---|---|---|---|---|---|
| Quantity | 477 | 129 | 59 | 42 | 58 |
Data sekolah di Kota Padang

== Notable people ==
- Mahyeldi Ansharullah (1966-)
- Bagindo Azizchan (1910-1947)
- Abubakar Jaar (1899-1985)
- Hendri Septa (1976-)
- Johannes Vallentin Dominicus Werbata (1866-1929)

== Twin towns – sister cities ==
Padang is twinned with:

- Bà Rịa–Vũng Tàu, Vietnam
- Beit Lahia, Palestine
- El Cajon, United States
- Suzhou, China

Padang also has a friendship agreement with:

- Fremantle, Australia (since 1996)

== See also ==
- Japanese occupation of West Sumatra
