= List of regencies and cities in West Sumatra =

This is a list of regencies and cities in West Sumatra province. As of October 2019, there were 12 regencies and 7 cities.

#	Regency/ City	Administrative centre	Regent/ Mayor	Area (km^{2})	Population (2019)	District	Kelurahan (urban village)/ Desa (village)	Emblem	Location map
1	Agam Regency	Lubuk Basung	Benni Warlis	1.804,30	528.619	16	-/82		
2	Dharmasraya Regency	Pulau Punjung	Annisa Suci Ramadhani	2.961,13	212.653	11	-/52		
3	Kepulauan Mentawai Regency	Tuapejat	Rinto Wardana	6.011,35	87.517	10	-/43		
4	Lima Puluh Kota Regency	Sarilamak	Safni Sikumbang	3.571,14	380.713	13	-/79		
5	Padang Pariaman Regency	Parit Malintang	John Kenedy Azis	1.332,51	427.919	17	-/103		
6	Pasaman Regency	Lubuk Sikaping	Welly Suhery	3.947,63	318.379	12	-/37		
7	Pasaman Barat Regency	Simpang Ampek	Yulianto	3.887,77	431.575	11	-/19		
8	Pesisir Selatan Regency	Painan	Hendrajoni	5.749,89	508.691	15	-/182		
9	Sijunjung Regency	Muaro Sijunjung	Benny Dwifa Yuswir	3.130,40	236.910	8	-/61		
10	Solok Regency	Arosuka	Jon Firman Pandu	3.738,00	384.091	14	-/74		
11	Solok Selatan Regency	Padang Aro	Khairunas	3.346,20	180.905	7	-/39		
12	Tanah Datar Regency	Batusangkar	Eka Putra	1.336,10	370.993	14	-/75		
13	Bukittinggi	-	Ramlan Nurmatias	25,24	121.590	3	24/-		
14	Padang	-	Fadly Amran	693,66	900.922	11	104/-		
15	Padang Panjang	-	Hendri Arnis	23,00	57.767	2	16/-		
16	Pariaman	-	Yota Balad	66,13	92.758	4	16/55		
17	Payakumbuh	-	Zulmaeta	85,22	137.792	5	47/-		
18	Sawahlunto	-	Riyanda Putra	231,93	66.377	4	10/27		
19	Solok	-	Ramadhani Kirana Putra	71,29	73.614	2	13/-		
