= List of incumbent regional heads and deputy regional heads in West Sumatra =

The following is an article about the list of Regional Heads and Deputy Regional Heads in 19 regencies/cities in West Sumatra who are currently still serving.

== List ==
Regency/ City	Photo of the Regent/ Mayor	Regent/ Mayor	Photo of Deputy Regent/ Mayor	Deputy Regent/ Mayor	Taking Office	End of Office (Planned)	Ref.
Agam; Regency List of Regents/Deputy Regents	pus	Benni Warlis	pus	Muhammad Iqbal	20 February 2025	20 February 2030	
Dharmasraya; Regency List of Regents/Deputy Regents	pus	Annisa Suci Ramadhani	pus	Leli Arni	20 February 2025	20 February 2030	
Mentawai Islands; Regency List of Regents/Deputy Regents	pus	Rinto Wardana	pus	Jakop Saguruk	20 February 2025	20 February 2030	
Lima Puluh Kota; Regency List of Regents/Deputy Regents	pus	Safni	pus	Ahlul Badrito Resha	20 February 2025	20 February 2030	
Padang Pariaman; Regency List of Regents/Deputy Regents	pus	John Kenedy Azis	pus	Rahmat Hidayat	20 February 2025	20 February 2030	
Pasaman; Regency List of Regents/Deputy Regents	pus	Welly Suhery	pus	Parulian Dalimunthe	30 May 2025	30 May 2030	
West Pasaman; Regency List of Regents/Deputy Regents	pus	Yulianto	pus	M. Ihpan	25 March 2025	25 March 2030	
Pesisir Selatan; Regency List of Regents/Deputy Regents	pus	Hendrajoni	pus	Risnaldi Ibrahim	20 February 2025	20 February 2030	
Sijunjung; Regency List of Regents/Deputy Regents		Benny Dwifa Yuswir		Iraddatillah	20 February 2025	20 February 2030	
Solok; Regency List of Regents/Deputy Regents	pus	Jon Firman Pandu	pus	Candra	20 February 2025	20 February 2030	
South Solok; Regency List of Regents/Deputy Regents		Khairunas		Yulian Efi	20 February 2025	20 February 2030	
Tanah Datar; Regency List of Regents/Deputy Regents	pus	Eka Putra	pus	Ahmad Fadly	20 February 2025	20 February 2030	
Bukittinggi; City List of Mayors/Deputy mayors	pus	Ramlan Nurmatias	pus	Ibnu Asis	20 February 2025	20 February 2030	
Padang; City List of Mayors/Deputy mayors	pus	Fadly Amran	pus	Maigus Nasir	20 February 2025	20 February 2030	
Padang Panjang; City List of Mayors/Deputy mayors	pus	Hendri Arnis	pus	Allex Saputra	20 February 2025	20 February 2030	
Pariaman; City List of Mayors/Deputy mayors	pus	Yota Balad	pus	Mulyadi	20 February 2025	20 February 2030	
Payakumbuh; City List of Mayors/Deputy mayors	pus	Zulmaeta	pus	Elzadaswarman	20 February 2025	20 February 2030	
Sawahlunto; City List of Mayors/Deputy mayors	pus	Riyanda Putra	pus	Jeffry Hibatullah	20 February 2025	20 February 2030	
Solok; City List of Mayors/Deputy mayors	pus	Ramadhani Kirana Putra	pus	Suryadi Nurdal	20 February 2025	20 February 2030	

Notes

- "Commencement of office" is the inauguration date at the beginning or during the current term of office. For acting regents/mayors, it is the date of appointment or extension as acting regent/mayor.
- Based on the Constitutional Court decision Number 27/PUU-XXII/2024, the Governor and Deputy Governor, Regent and Deputy Regent, and Mayor and Deputy Mayor elected in 2020 shall serve until the inauguration of the Governor and Deputy Governor, Regent and Deputy Regent, and Mayor and Deputy Mayor elected in the 2024 national simultaneous elections as long as the term of office does not exceed 5 (five) years.

== See also ==
- West Sumatra
