= Grand Mosque of Kubang Putih =

Mosque in Kubang Putiah, West Sumatra, Indonesia

- Masjid Raya Kubang Putih
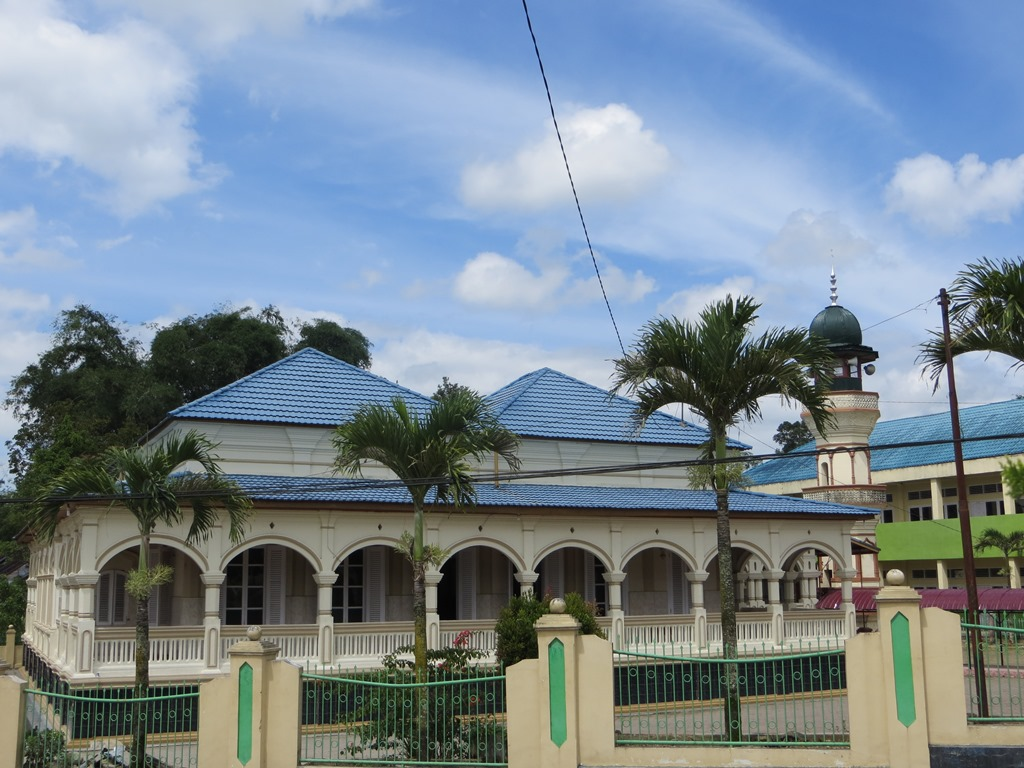

- Location within Indonesia

Religion
- Affiliation: Islam
- Branch/tradition: Sunni

Location
- Location: Kubang Putiah, Banuhampu Subdistrict
- Municipality: Agam
- State: West Sumatra
- Country: Indonesia
- Interactive map of Grand Mosque of Kubang Putih
- Coordinates: 0°20′00″S 100°24′04″E

Architecture
- Type: mosque
- Completed: 1810

Specifications
- Length: 23.75 metres (77.9 ft)
- Width: 21.2 metres (70 ft)
- Minaret: 1

The Grand Mosque of Kubang Putih (Indonesian: Masjid Raya Kubang Putih) is an early 19th-century mosque located in the town of Kubang Putiah, West Sumatra, Indonesia. The mosque is designated as a cultural heritage object along with several other old mosques in West Sumatra, such as Bingkudu Mosque in Agam, Rao Rao Mosque in Tanah Datar, and the Ganting Grand Mosque in Padang.

== Description ==
The mosque was built in 1810. The mosque is the oldest mosque in the Bunuhampu Subdistrict of Agam, followed by the Jami Mosque of Taluak (1870 M). The Grand Mosque of Kubang Putih was built in 1810. The mosque stands on an area of 611 square metres (6,580 sq ft). The main building is rectangular-shaped, measuring 23.75 metres (77.9 ft) in length and 21.2 metres (70 ft) in width.

The Grand Mosque of Kubang Putih was built in eclectic style, combining different architectural styles, e.g. European, Mughal, and Chinese architecture. Unlike most mosques in West Sumatra, the Grand Mosque of Kubang Putih lacks steep, curving, multi-tiered roofs. The roof of the Grand Mosque of Kubang Putih is built in the form of four low-angled pyramids covered in corrugated metal.

The main hall of the mosque has four main pillars similar to the Javanese saka guru. The pillars are rectangular in shape and are plastered in the middle. The mihrab has four pillars, the pulpit is built out of concrete.

The mosque is surrounded with a 2 metres (6.6 ft) gallery. The west gallery is separated by the space for the mihrab which protrudes outward, right at the center of the 7.8 metres (26 ft) long porch. The entrance is located on the east side of the mihrab, marked by a verandah which extends outward and measures 7.5 × 5 meters.

A minaret known locally as put is located to the east of the mosque, parallel with the mihrab. The minaret is separated from the main building. The shape of the minaret is similar to other early 19th-century mosques of Minangkabau e.g. the Jami Mosque of Taluak. The minaret has an octagonal layout and is decorated with Arabo-Persian inspired patterns. Two balconies is situated at the middle level and the upper level of the minaret. The top of the minaret is crowned with a dome on top of a roof eaves protecting the upper balcony from tropical sun and rain. Historically, the minarets of Minangkabau mosques were introduced during the early times of the Padri War by a number of reformist Islamists who returned from the Middle East.

In 1989, the mosque was restored.
