= Bayur Grand Mosque =

Mosque in Agam, West Sumatra, Indonesia

Raya Bayur Mosque Masjid Raya Bayur
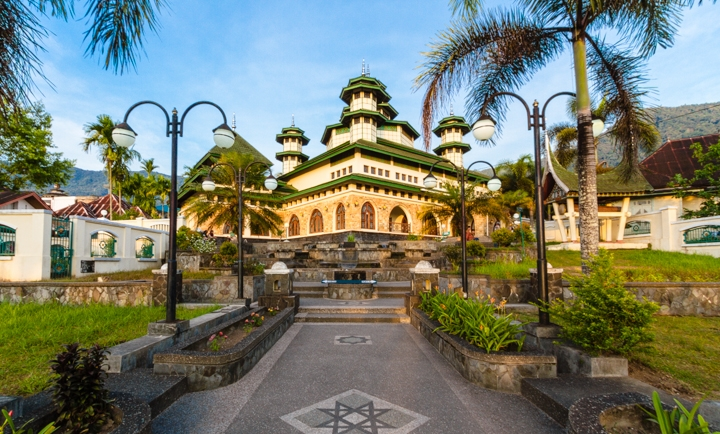

- Location within West Sumatra Location within Sumatra Location within Indonesia

Religion
- Affiliation: Islam
- Branch/tradition: Sunni

Location
- Location: Nagari Bayur, Tanjung Raya, Agam Regency, West Sumatera, Indonesia
- Interactive map of Raya Bayur Mosque; Masjid Raya Bayur
- Coordinates: 0.274873°S 100.221439°E

Architecture
- Architect: Hendri Tanjung
- Type: Mosque
- Style: Minangkabau, Thai
- Groundbreaking: 1999

Specifications
- Capacity: 1,000 pilgrims
- Minaret: 4

Bayur Grand Mosque (Indonesian: Masjid Raya Bayur) is a mosque located in Nagari Bayur, Tanjung Raya, Agam Regency, West Sumatra, Indonesia. It is not far from the main road connecting Lubuk Basung, the capital city of Agam Regency, and Bukittinggi.

== Renovation ==
While the original structure was built in the early 20th century, seeing the increasingly unorganized condition of the mosque's buildings and neighborhoods, early in the year 2000 the local community attempted to renovate it as a whole. These idea arose from the Dantak Tantawi Entrepreneurs in Jakarta (Sumando Bayur) and supported by Bachtiar Chamsyah in Jakarta, whose origin is Bayur nomad and also served as Minister of Social Affairs under the Megawati Soekarnoputri administration. In addition to Bachtiar, nomads from Nagari Bayur also sent aids. Thus renovation of the mosque completed shortly thereafter.

The renovation includes repairing of the buildings and arrangement of surrounding environment, such as open spaces, parking areas, and mosque gardens. In the process of renovation, the community was forced to dismantle two buildings, namely 'balerong' building (Nagari Bayur government office) and an elementary school, which was then moved to another place.

== Architecture ==
The architecture of the mosque combines the shape of pagoda of Thailand and the 'gonjong' roof form of Minangkabau traditional house (Gadang House). The combination can be seen in a small tower located on four main corners. Similarly, the structure of the roof is designed to follow the pattern of the traditional building with three-tiered roof. Interior of the mosque contains some notable ornaments. The walls of the mosque are lined with carved planks painted with dark color compositions. So are the buffer pillars of the mosque. The pillars made of the wall are decorated with soft colors that match the paint scheme of the walls of the mosque. At the front of the mosque, there is an open space equipped with a fountain. While at the back of the mosque room there is a fish pond, and on both sides of the fish pond there are places for wudu. The mosque is equipped with several supporting facilities, such as place for leaving slippers and shoes while prayer, place for wudu for men and women, as well as the parking area. For female pilgrims who wish to perform the prayer, religious attires such as sarung and mukena are available.
