= Kaharuddin Datuk Rangkayo Basa =

Indonesian politician (1906–1981)

Governor of West Sumatra
- In office 17 May 1958 – 5 July 1965
- Preceded by: Position created
- Succeeded by: Soepoetro Brotodihardjo (acting); Harun Zain

Personal details
- Born: Kaharuddin; 17 January 1906 Bayur, Agam, Dutch East Indies
- Died: 1 April 1981 (aged 75) Padang, West Sumatra, Indonesia

Kaharuddin Datuk Rangkayo Basa (17 January 1906 – 1 April 1981) was an Indonesian police officer and politician who was the first governor of West Sumatra, serving from 1958 until his removal in 1965. His tenure included the rebellion of the Revolutionary Government of the Republic of Indonesia in the province, which he had been an opponent of before his appointment.

== Early life ==
Kaharuddin was born in the nagari of Bayur, on the shores of Lake Maninjau and today part of Agam Regency, on 17 January 1906. He was educated at a Hollandsch-Inlandsche School in Padang, and later at a civil servant preparatory school in Bukittinggi.

== Career ==
After completing his education, Kaharuddin joined the colonial police force. By 1932, he had been promoted to assistant to the chief of police in Solok. He received his traditional title Datuk Rangkayo Basa in April 1937 when he was serving as a deputy chief of the police in Baso, Agam. He continued to serve as a police officer during the Japanese occupation of West Sumatra, having become a district chief of police by the time of the occupation's end in 1945.

In December 1956, a number of regional military commanders in Central Sumatra established the Banteng Council, initially aiming at increased regional autonomy. By this point, Kaharuddin had become the police chief of the province, and he supported the council. However, as the council began to move towards outright revolt against the central Indonesian government, Kaharuddin began to voice his misgivings. When the Banteng Council eventually declared the formation of the Revolutionary Government of the Republic of Indonesia (PRRI) in February 1958, Kaharuddin refused to participate and became one of its key opponents. By April, government troops had landed in Padang, with Kaharuddin joining the central government forces. PRRI's leader Sjafruddin Prawiranegara wrote that Kaharuddin's actions had crippled PRRI's capacity to fight the central government.

Kaharuddin was appointed as the civil coordinator of the government for the newly formed province of West Sumatra on 7 May 1958, and then elevated to become the province's acting governor on 17 May. As the province's first governor, he officially made Padang the provincial capital on 29 May. As PRRI was defeated, Kaharuddin continued to serve as governor, although his powers were limited with significant authority being held by the military forces maintained in the area. He was removed from his post and reassigned to Java on 5 July 1965, and was replaced by Soepoetro Brotodihardjo as acting governor.

== Death ==
Kaharuddin died on 1 April 1981 in Padang. Prior to his death, he had refused to be buried in a heroes' cemetery, and thus he was buried at a regular public cemetery.
