= Lubuk =

Lubuk may refer to the following places:

== Indonesia ==
- Lubuk Basung, West Sumatra
- Lubuk Pakam, North Sumatra
- Lubuk Sikaping, West Sumatra

== Malaysia ==
- Lubuk China, Malacca
- Lubuk Paku, Pahang
- Lubuk Tupah, Kedah
