= Pusako Anak Nagari Airport =

Pusako Anak Nagari Airport Bandar Udara Pusako Anak Nagari
- IATA: none; ICAO: WIEP

Summary
- Operator: Government
- Serves: Simpang Ampek (West Pasaman Regency)
- Location: Jorong Laban, Nagari Kapa, Luhak nan Duo, West Pasaman Regency
- Time zone: WIB (UTC+07:00)
- Elevation AMSL: 131 ft / 40 m
- Coordinates: 00°04′35.6″N 99°47′05″E
- Interactive map of Pusako Anak Nagari Airport

Runways
| Direction | Length | | Surface |
| Direction | ft | m | Surface |
|---|---|---|---|
| 06/24 | | 795 | asphalt |
- DGCA

Pusako Anak Nagari Airport (Indonesian: Bandar Udara Pusako Anak Nagari) is a domestic airport located in Jorong Laban, Nagari Kapa, Luhak Nan Duo District, West Pasaman Regency, West Sumatra, Indonesia.

The airport was developed by the West Pasaman Regency Government as a pioneer airport to improve air transportation access in the regency. It previously served pioneer flights connecting West Pasaman with Padang and Pekanbaru.

== History ==
Construction of the airport was undertaken by the West Pasaman Regency Government. In 2013, the Ministry of Transportation stated that development works were being accelerated and targeted for completion that year, with airport operations expected to begin in 2014.

The airport was officially inaugurated by West Sumatra Governor Irwan Prayitno on 18 September 2014.

In 2015, the airport was served by Susi Air pioneer flights to Padang. Flights operated three times a week, on Tuesdays, Thursdays, and Sundays.

According to local government officials, the airport stopped operating scheduled services in 2021. In 2025, the West Pasaman Regency Government stated that it hoped the Ministry of Transportation would restore air services because of their importance for transportation access and disaster mitigation.

== Facilities ==
Pusako Anak Nagari Airport is an airport operated by the technical implementation unit within regional government. The airport has a runway measuring 795 x 18 metres, a taxiway measuring 60 x 10 metres.

The airport occupied an area of approximately 12 hectares. Facilities included a passenger terminal, airport administration office, generator building, and a semi-tower for air traffic control.

== See also ==
- Minangkabau International Airport
- Rokot Airport
