= 2024 Dharmasraya regency election =

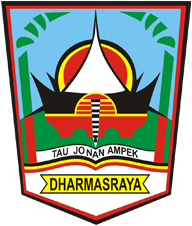
- 27 November 2024
- Registered: 169,079
- Turnout: 96,873 (57.29%)
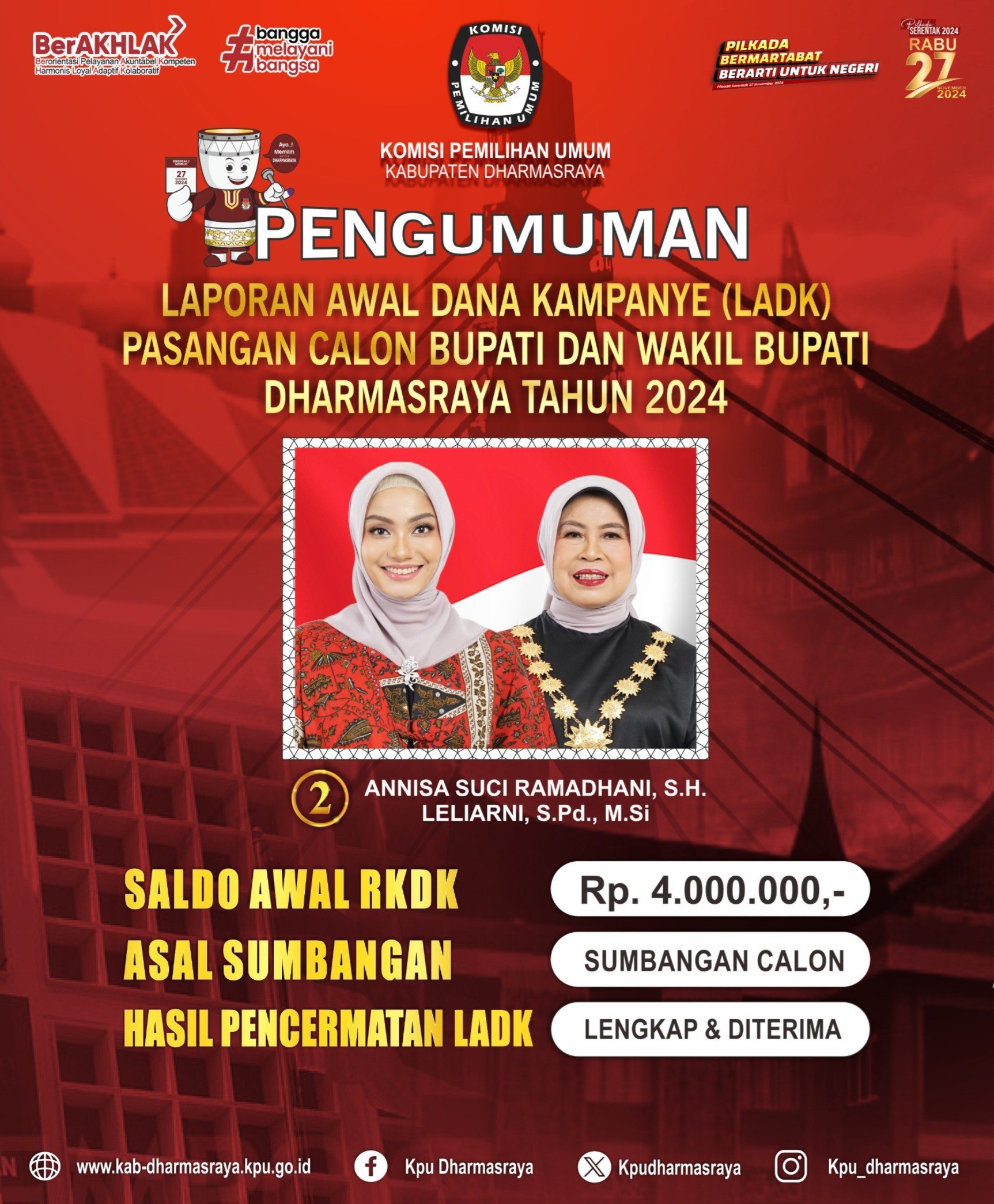
Nominee	Annisa Suci Ramadhani	Blank vote
Party	PDI-P
Running mate	Leli Arni
Popular vote	65,922	28.895
Percentage	69.53%	30,47%
Regent before election
Sutan Riska Tuanku Kerajaan and Dasril Panin Datuk Labuan
PDI-P
Elected Regent
Annisa Suci Ramadhani and Leli Arni
PDI-P

The 2024 Dharmasraya Regental Election was held on November 27, 2024, to elect the Regent for the 2025–2030 term.

The Dharmasraya Regent Election (Pilbup) will be held following the 2024 Indonesian Presidential Election (Pilpres) and the 2024 Indonesian Legislative Election (Pileg), concurrently with all provinces and regencies/cities throughout Indonesia.

The incumbent Regent, Sutan Riska Tuanku Kerajaan, was eligible to run again in the 2024 Dharmasraya Regent Election because he has already served two terms.

== Nomination threshold requirements ==
The 2024 legislative elections resulted in 10 political parties with 30 seats in the Dharmasraya Regency Regional People's Representative Council (DPRD). The initial regulation stated that political parties or coalitions of political parties could nominate candidates for Regent and Deputy Regent if they met the threshold of 25% of the total valid vote or 20% of the seats in the Dharmasraya Regency DPRD, or 6 out of 30 seats.

On August 20, 2024, the Constitutional Court (MK) issued Decisions No. 60/PUU-XXII/2024 and No. 70/PUU-XXII/2024, partially granting the lawsuit filed by the Labor Party and the Gelora Party against the Regional Election Law. This decision was outlined in KPU Regulation Number 8 of 2024. The decision stated that political parties or coalitions of political parties participating in the election could nominate candidates for the position of “regional head” even if they did not have seats in the DPRD, within the stipulated threshold. The final voter list (DPT) in Dharmasraya Regency was 166,987 voters, so according to the rules, regencies with a population listed on the final voter list of up to 250,000 people, Political Parties participating in the Election or a Coalition of Political Parties participating in the Election must obtain at least 10% (ten percent) of valid votes in the regency to nominate a candidate pair for regent and deputy regent. Based on this rule and following the results of the 2024 Election, 5 political parties that nominated candidates without having to form a coalition, namely the Golkar Party (18.68%), PDI-P (18.48%), PAN (12.63%), Gerindra Party (11.57%), and PKB (11.09%).

The following is the vote and seat acquisition for the Dharmasraya Regency DPRD as a result of the 2024 Election.

No.	Political parties	Votes		DPRD seats	▲▼ (2019)
1	Partai Kebangkitan Bangsa	15.273	11,09%	4 / 30	▲3 kursi
2	Partai Gerakan Indonesia Raya	15.937	11,57%	4 / 30	▲1 kursi
3	Partai Demokrasi Indonesia Perjuangan	25.444	18,48%	6 / 30	▼1 kursi
4	Partai Golongan Karya	25.718	18,68%	5 / 30	Steady
5	Partai NasDem	8.354	6,07%	1 / 30	▼2 kursi
6	Partai Buruh (2021)	0	0,00%	0 / 30	
7	Partai Gelora	298	0,22%	0 / 30	
8	Partai Keadilan Sejahtera (2020)	7.839	5,69%	1 / 30	▼1 kursi
9	Partai Kebangkitan Nusantara	0	0,00%	0 / 30	
10	Partai Hati Nurani Rakyat	5.638	4,09%	1 / 30	Steady
11	Partai Garda Republik Indonesia	23	0,02%	0 / 30	
12	Partai Amanat Nasional	17.397	12,63%	5 / 30	▲1 kursi
13	Partai Bulan Bintang	28	0,02%	0 / 30	
14	Partai Demokrat	9.616	6,98%	2 / 30	Steady
15	Partai Solidaritas Indonesia	0	0,00%	0 / 30	
16	Partai Persatuan Indonesia	13	0,01%	0 / 30	
17	Partai Persatuan Pembangunan	6.123	4,45%	1 / 30	▲1 kursi
24	Partai Ummat	0	0,00%	0 / 30	
Totals		137.701	100,00%	30	

== Candidates ==
Annisa Suci Ramadhani	Leli Arni
Candidate for Regent	Candidate for Deputy Regent
Special Staff to the Speaker of the House of Representatives (2018–2019); Special Staff to Commission XI of the House of Representatives (2017–2018)	Member of the West Sumatra Provincial DPRD (2019–2024)
Partai Pengusung
PDIP Golkar PAN Gerindra PKB; Demokrat PKS 2020 PPP Hanura
Partai Pendukung
NasDem PSI
Suara sah Pemilu Legislatif 2024
128,985 / 137,701 (94%)
Kursi DPRD Kabupaten Dharmasraya
29 / 30 (97%)
Vision
"Dharmasraya: Growing, Competitive, Educated, and Cultured by Engaging the Community in a Transformation of Welfare and Justice."
Promises
1. Improve the quality of education and health.; 2. Create and develop a locally-based economy.; 3. Achieve progressive and equitable development transformation.; 4. Achieve environmentally sound and equitable environmental and natural resource management.; 5. Achieve digital-based and innovative governance.; 6. Improve community economic development and growth of local revenue.

== Hasil rekapitulasi ==
Candidate	Running mate	Party	Votes	%
Kolom kosong tidak bergambar		28,895	30.47	
Annisa Suci Ramadhani	Leli Arni	PDI-P	65,922	69.53
Total			94,817	100.00
Valid votes			94,817	97.88
Invalid/blank votes			2,056	2.12
Total votes			96,873	100.00
Registered voters/turnout			169,079	57.29
Source: Keputusan KPU Kabupaten Dharmasraya No. 867 Tahun 2024

== Election of the candidates ==
Candidate pair number 2, Annisa Suci Ramadhani and Leli Arni, were declared the elected Regent and Deputy Regent of Dharmasraya by the Dharmasraya Regency General Elections Commission (KPU) on January 9, 2025, based on Dharmasraya Regency KPU Decree No. 1 of 2025.

== Inauguration of the elected candidate team ==
Annisa Suci Ramadhani and Leli Arni were officially inaugurated as the Regent and Deputy Regent of Dharmasraya for the 2025–2030 period at the State Palace on February 20, 2025, by Indonesian President Prabowo Subianto, along with 480 other regional head pairs, including the Governor and Deputy Governor of West Sumatra and 16 district/city heads in West Sumatra Province. Annisa became the first female regent in Dharmasraya Regency and the entire province of West Sumatra.
