= Lambah =

Coordinates: 0°22′N 100°07′E

Lambah is a village in the Agam Regency of West Sumatra, Indonesia. It is one of seven villages in the Ampek Angkek subdistrict. It borders Panampuang in the North, Biaro Gadang and Kapau in the West, Biaro Gadang and Koto Canduang Laweh in the South, and Tabek Panjang in the East. Its population is approximately 4,100 people.
