= Jami Mosque of Taluak =

Mosque in Agam, West Sumatra, Indonesia

Coordinates: 0.3278°S 100.38818°E

Jami Mosque of Taluak Masjid Jamik Taluak Bukittinggi
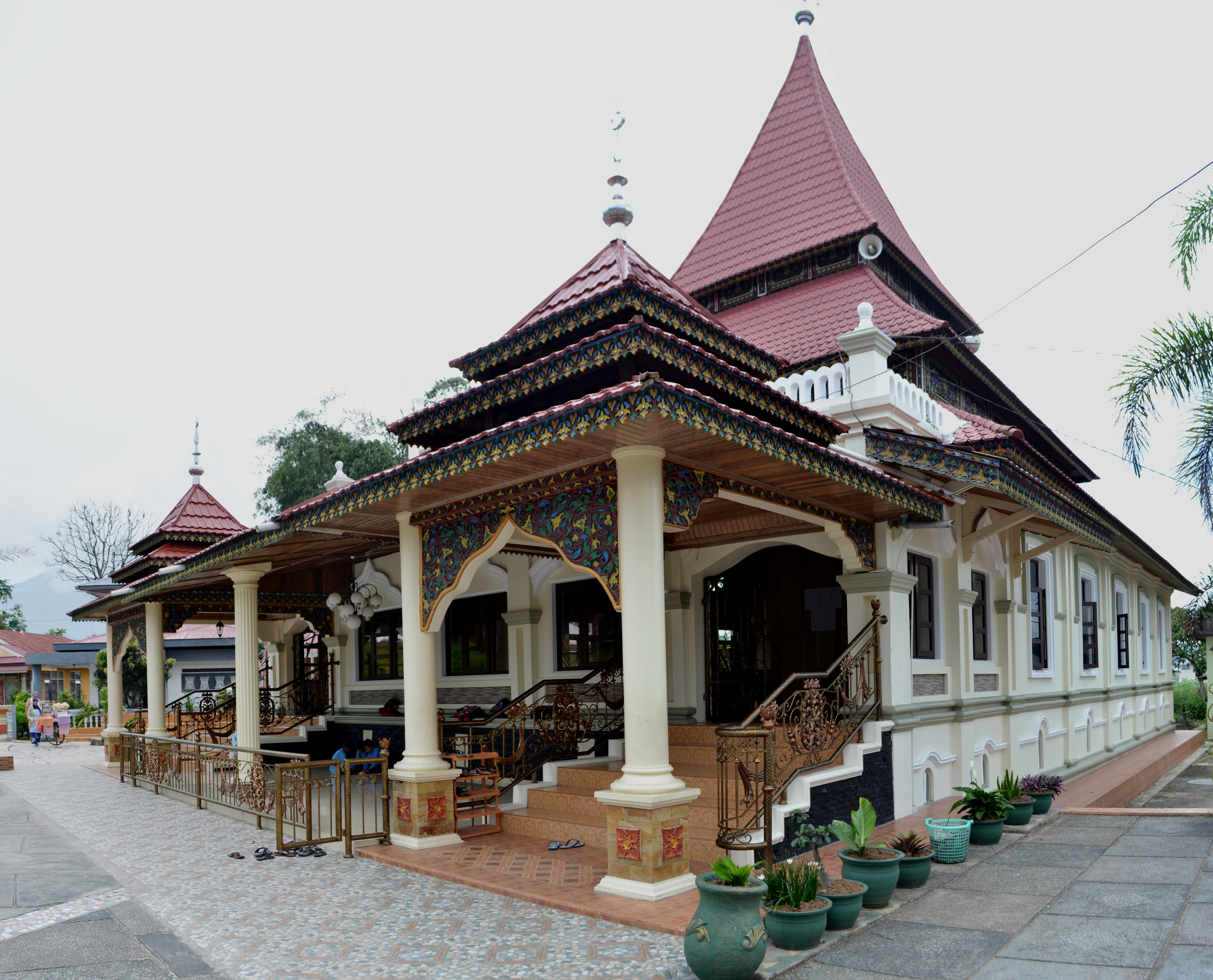

Religion
- Affiliation: Islam
- Branch/tradition: Sunni

Location
- Location: Taluak IV Suku Nagari, Banuhampu District, Agam Regency, West Sumatra, Indonesia
- Interactive map of Jami Mosque of Taluak; Masjid Jamik Taluak Bukittinggi

Architecture
- Type: Mosque
- Style: Minangkabau; Middle Eastern, Indian (minaret and facade)
- Groundbreaking: 1860

Specifications
- Direction of façade: Southeast
- Minaret: 1

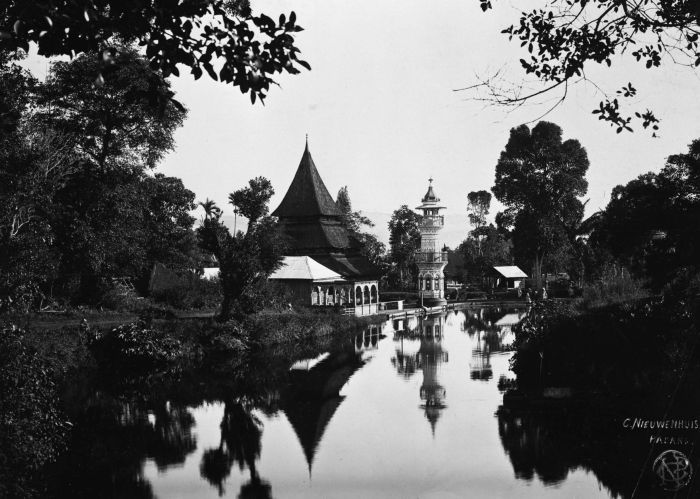
The atmosphere of the neighborhood around Jami Mosque of Taluak between 1892 and 1922.

Jami Mosque of Taluak is one of the oldest mosques in Indonesia, located in Taluak IV Suku Nagari, Banuhampu District, Agam Regency, West Sumatra. The location of the mosque is close to the border of Bukittinggi, thus it is also known as Jamik Taluak Mosque Bukittinggi.

Construction of the mosque was initiated by Haji Abdul Majid in 1860. It was originally made with wooden roofs. The mosque had suffered some significant damage caused by earthquakes, most recently the 2007 Sumatra earthquake, which resulted in severe damage to the mosque. Despite several improvements and repairs, the authenticity of the mosque is well maintained.

The architecture of the mosque as a whole is influenced by the Minangkabau style. Arabic influence came later with the construction of minarets and facade. With its architecture, the mosque also became one of the most photographed mosques during the time of Dutch Colonization, and the photos are collected by Tropenmuseum in Amsterdam, Netherlands today.

Nowadays, apart from being used for Islamic worshiping activities, this one-floor mosque is also used as a place for religious education for the community. It also has become one of the most well known tourist attractions in Agam Regency as well as in the city of Bukittinggi.

Jamik Taluak Mosque Bukittinggi is currently under the management of the Archaeological Heritage Conservation Agency (BP3) oversees West Sumatra, Riau and Riau Islands.

== Architecture ==
The main building of this mosque, which is a prayer room, has an area of 13 square meters. To the direction of southeast, there is a porch which serves as a transition area from the outside to the inside with a length of 13 meters and 3 meters wide. The porch is not a front porch however, as it has walls and some windows. The entry stairs leading to the porch are not located in the center of the facade, but on the left and right ends, each with its own roof. The entire roof, including the roof of the prayer hall except the minaret roof, is a pyramid-shaped staircase, commonly employed by vernacular style mosques in Indonesian archipelago. The only difference here is that it is made with a much sharper slope and a concave surface, suitable for tropical climates because it can drain the rainwater downward quicker. Each roof is made in square shape and overall it is made of three levels. Between each level, there are gaps for lighting and ventilation.

=== Minaret ===
The mosque is equipped with a minaret which stands apart from the main building, and known by the local community as "manaruh (lighthouse)". Although it is not yet known exactly when the minaret was built, it was recorded that minarets of the similar forms were introduced to Minangkabau people in the early nineteenth century by a number of Islamic reformers known as the Padri.

Minaret of the mosque consists of three parts, and there is a spiral staircase inside. The surfaces are filled with Arabesque and ornaments from Persia. Between each part there is a balcony that surrounds it. The first part, which is the bottom of the minaret, is decorated with Persian style patterns. The second part, which is the smaller upward area, is decorated with Arabesque in the form of calligraphy. The third or top part, which is covered by onion dome-shaped roof, is similar to the minaret roof of the traditional mosques in India.

== Gallery ==
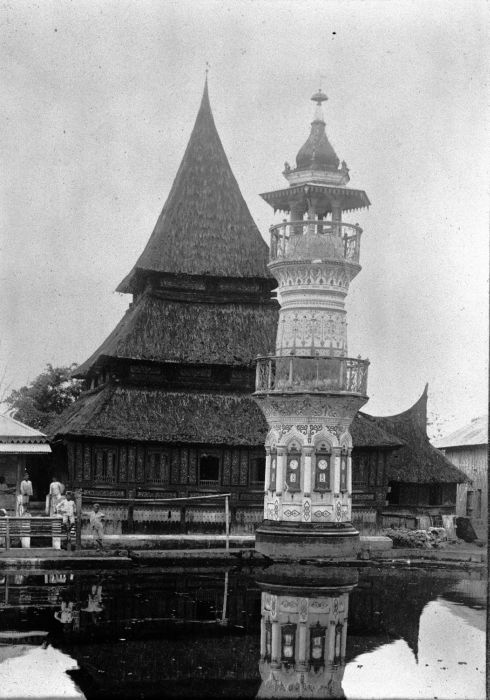
Another angle

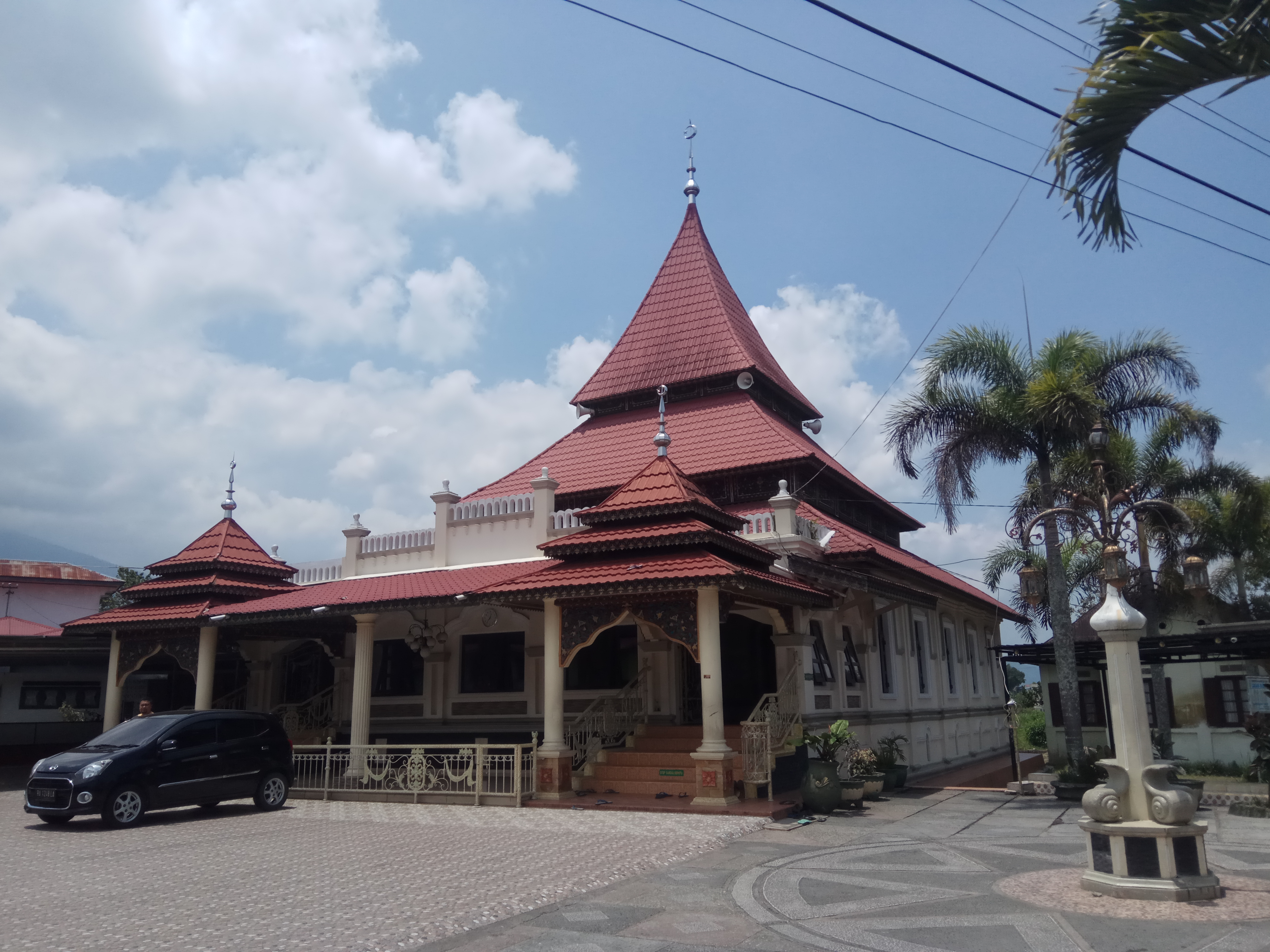
From gate of mosque in 2016

== See also ==
- Bingkudu Mosque
- List of oldest mosques in Indonesia
- Vernacular mosque architecture in Indonesia
