= Mayor of Bukittinggi =

- Wali Kota Bukittinggi
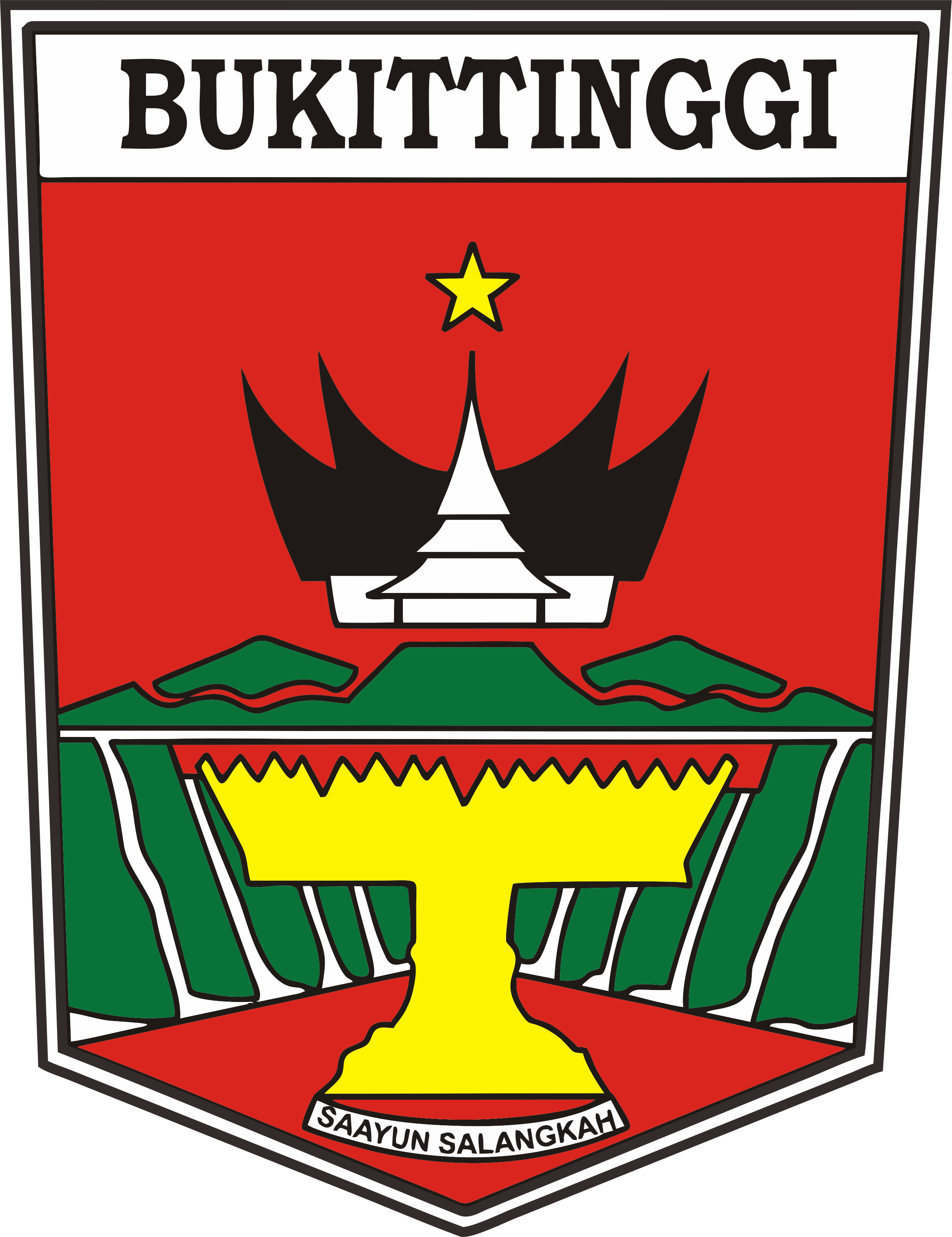
- Coat of arms of Bukittinggi

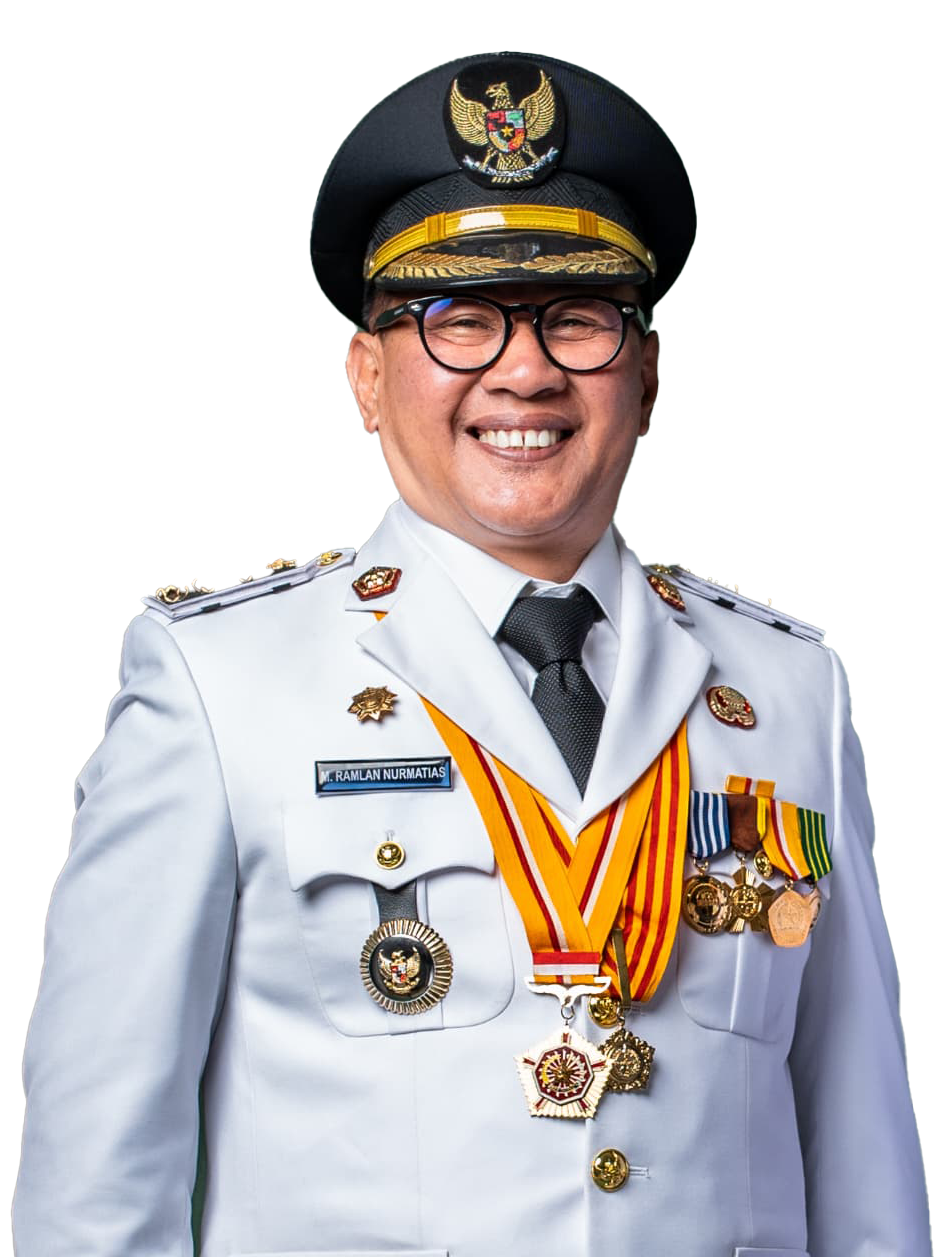
- Incumbent; M. Ramlan Nurmatias since 20 February 2025
- Term length: 5 years
- Inaugural holder: Bermawi Soetan Radja Emas
- Formation: October 1945
- Website: Official website

Mayor of Bukittinggi is the head of the second-level region who holds the government in Bukittinggi together with the Vice Mayor and 25 members of the Bukittinggi City Regional House of Representatives. The mayor and vice mayor of Bukittinggi are elected through general elections held every 5 years. The first mayor of Bukittinggi was Bermawi Soetan Radja Emas, who governed the city period from October 1945 to November 1945.

== List ==
The following is a list of the names of the Mayors of Bukittinggi from time to time.

Mayor of Bukittinggi
Num.	Portrait	Mayor	Beginning of office	End of Term	Political Party / Faction	Period	Note.	Vice mayor
1		Bermawi Soetan Radja Emas	October 1945	November 1945	Independent	1		N/A
2		Djamin Datuk Bagindo	November 1945	1947	Independent	2		Iskandar Tedjasukmana (1946)
3		A. Azir Jenie	1948	1949	Independent	3		N/A
4		Eni Karim	1949	1950	Independent	4		N/A
5		Saadudin Jambek	1950	1952	Independent	5		N/A
6		Nauman Djamil Dt. Mangkuto Ameh	1952	1957	Independent	6		N/A
7		Anwar Datuk Madjo Basa Nan Kuning	1957	1958	Independent	7		N/A
8		dr. Abdoel Rivai St. Maharajo Lelo	1958	1959	Independent	8		N/A
9		Baharuddin Kamil	1959	1960	Independent	9		N/A
10		Kompol. H. Anwar Maksoem Marah Sutan	1960	1966	Independent	10		N/A
11		Prof. M. Asril; S.H.	1966	1968	Independent	11		N/A
12		H. Abdul Kamal; S.H.	1968	1976	Independent	12		N/A
13		Drs. Masri	1976	1978	Independent	13		N/A
14		Drs. Oemar Gaffar	1978	1983	Independent	14		N/A
15		Drs. B. Burhanuddin	1983	1988	Independent	15		N/A
–		Drs. H. Hasan Basri (Acting Officer)	1988	1989	Independent	–		N/A
16		Kolonel Inf. H. Armedi Agus	6 July 1989	1994	Independent	16		N/A
16		Kolonel Inf. H. Armedi Agus	1994	1999	Independent	17		N/A
–		Drs. Rusdi Lubis (Acting Officer)	1999	2000	Independent	–		N/A
17		Drs. H. Djufri	2000	2005	Independent	18		Khairul Hamdi
–		Drs. H. Oktisir Sjovijerli Asir (Acting Officer)	2005	13 August 2005	Independent	–		N/A
18		Drs. H. Djufri	13 August 2005	1 October 2009	Demokrat	19 (2005)	(Note: Resigned from his position because he was appointed as a member of the House of Representatives of the Republic of Indonesia for the 2009-2014 term.)	Ismet Amzis
19		H. Ismet Amzis; S.H. (Acting Officer)	1 October 2009	16 November 2009	Demokrat	19 (2005)		N/A
19		H. Ismet Amzis; S.H.	16 November 2009	13 August 2010	Demokrat	19 (2005)		N/A
19		H. Ismet Amzis; S.H.	13 August 2010	13 August 2015	Demokrat	20 (2010)		Harma Zaldi
–		H. Abdul Gafar; S.E., M.M. (Acting)	13 August 2015	17 February 2016	Independent	—		N/A
20		H. M. Ramlan Nurmatias; S.H.	17 February 2016	26 September 2020	Independent	21 (2015)		Irwandi
–		Zaenuddin (Temporary Acting)	26 September 2020	5 December 2020	Independent	21 (2015)		N/A
(20)		H. M. Ramlan Nurmatias; S.H.	5 December 2020	17 February 2021	Independent	21 (2015)		Irwandi
–		H. Yuen Karnova; S.E., M.E. (Daily executive)	17 February 2021	26 February 2021	Independent	–		N/A
21		H. Erman Safar; S.H.	26 February 2021	25 September 2024	Gerindra	22 (2020)		Marfendi
–		H. Hani Syopiar Rustam; S.H. (Temporary Acting)	25 September 2024	23 November 2024	Independent	22 (2020)		N/A
(21)		H. Erman Safar; S.H.	23 November 2024	20 February 2025	Gerindra	22 (2020)		Marfendi
22		H. M. Ramlan Nurmatias; S.H.	20 February 2025	Incumbent	Demokrat	23 (2024)		Ibnu Asis

== See also ==
- Bukittinggi
- List of incumbent regional heads and deputy regional heads in West Sumatra
