= Bayua =

- Nagari
- Interactive map of Bayua
- Coordinates: 0°15′39.6″S 100°13′19.2″E
- Country: Indonesia
- Province: West Sumatra
- Regency: Agam Regency
- District: Tanjung Raya
- Elevation: 562 m (1,844 ft)

Population (2020)
  - Total: 37,368
- Time zone: UTC+07:00 (Western Indonesia Time)
- Postal code: 26471
- Administrative code: 13.06.03.2004

Bayua is a village on the shores of Lake Maninjau in Agam Regency, in the Indonesian province of West Sumatra. Most of the people in Maninjau are ethnically Minangkabau.

An extreme weather incident in 2022 killed hundreds of tons of fish in the lake, littering the village's shores.
