= Dasril Panin Datuk Labuan =

Indonesian politician (1947–2022)

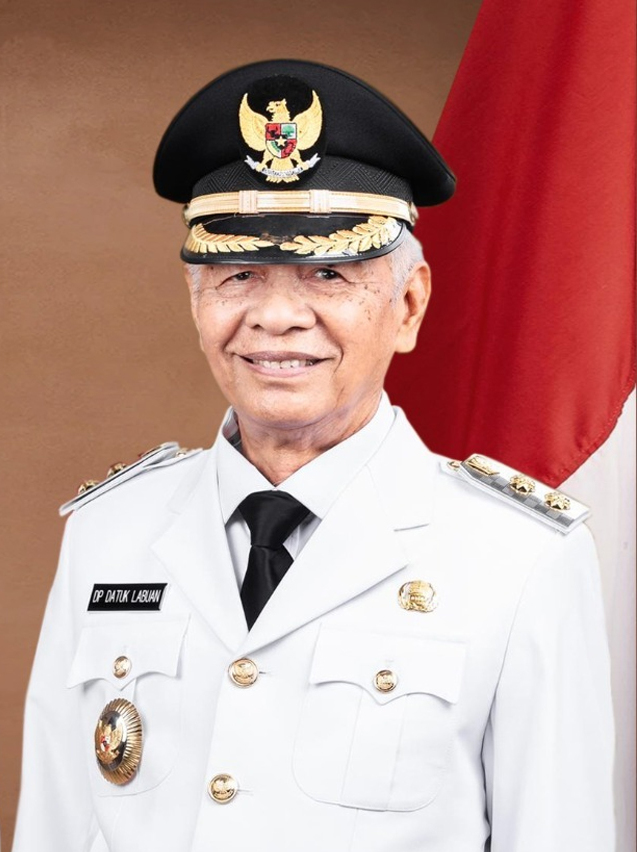
- Official portrait, 2021

Deputy Regent of Dharmasraya
- In office 26 February 2021 – 13 February 2022
- Preceded by: Amrizal
- Succeeded by: Vacant

Member of the People's Representative Council
- In office September 1993 – 2003
- In office 1 October 1982 – 1 October 1987

Personal details
- Born: Dasril Panin Datuk Labuan; 6 August 1947 Sungai Dareh, Pulau Punjung, West Sumatra, Dutch East Indies
- Died: 13 February 2022 (aged 74) Bukittinggi, Indonesia
- Party: Golkar (1979–2009); PDI-P (2009–2022)
- Education: University of Indonesia

Dasril Panin Datuk Labuan (6 August 1947 – 13 February 2022) was an Indonesian politician. A member of Golkar and later the Indonesian Democratic Party of Struggle, he served in the People's Representative Council from 1982 to 1987 and again from 1993 to 2003. He died in Bukittinggi on 13 February 2022, at the age of 74.
