= Bingkudu Mosque =

Mosque in Agam, West Sumatra, Indonesia

Bingkudu Mosque Masjid Jamik Bingkudu
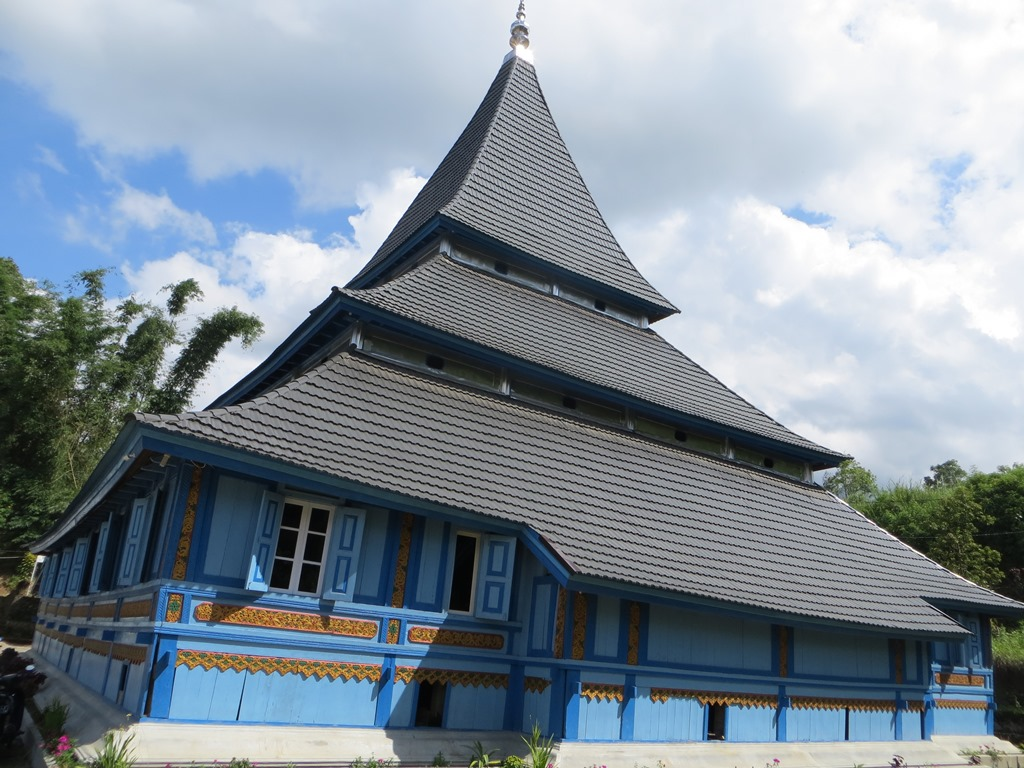

- Location within Sumatra Location within Indonesia

Religion
- Affiliation: Islam
- Branch/tradition: Sunni

Location
- Location: Jorong Bingkudu, Canduang Koto Laweh, Canduang District, Agam Regency, West Sumatra, Indonesia
- Coordinates: 0.31159°S 100.47388°E

Architecture
- Type: Mosque
- Style: Minangkabau
- Completed: 1823

Specifications
- Minaret: 1
- Minaret height: 11 m

The Bingkudu Mosque (sometimes spelled or written as Bengkudu Mosque and also called Jamik Bingkudu Mosque) is one of the oldest mosques in Indonesia. It was founded by the Padri in the wake of the Padri War in West Sumatra in 1823. This mosque with typical Minangkabau style architecture is located in Jorong Bingkudu, Nagari Canduang Koto Laweh, Canduang District, Agam Regency, West Sumatra. When it was first built, the building of the mosque was made of wood on its floor, pole, and wall.

Currently, in addition to being used as an Islamic worship activity and a means of religious education for students, Bingkudu Mosque is also used as the headquarters of the Jorong Bingkudu Poverty Eradication Coordinating Team. It was also designated by the government of Agam Regency as a cultural heritage in 1989. Thus in 1991, the mosque began to experience an overall restoration.

== Architecture ==
Original structures are well preserved until today. The architectural characteristics of the mosque is easy to recognize, especially in the form of a roof that consists of three layers with a little basin.

The mosque is located at the foot of Mount Marapi at an altitude of 1,050 m above sea level, and was built on a plot of 60 x 60 square meters, with a building area of 21 x 21 meters. Height of the building from the ground up to the top (roof) is around 19 meters. The building is constructed of wood, and three-story roof frame was made from fibers. Just like Rumah Gadang, a traditional Minangkabau residential building, the building of the mosque has a cage 1.5 meters below the ground.

== Restoration ==
Previously, the roof of the mosque was replaced with zinc in 1957. This work was done by the local community considering the condition of the fiber-made roof which had weathered by age. Two years later the mosque was designated as a cultural heritage and handed over to Agam Regency in 1989, thus the mosque underwent a complete restoration. So that the material of the roof which had been replaced into a zinc was returned to the fibers, and the weathered parts were replaced and re-painted as the original.

The restoration of the mosque itself in 1989 was carried out by the Conservation and Utilization of Historical and Archeological Projects of West Sumatra with focus on the roofing, ceiling, window, and the minaret. It was followed by the restoration of a tomb, place of wudu, minbar, mihrab, pond, and installation of lightning arrestor on the minaret, environmental arrangement, and construction of gate.

== Gallery ==
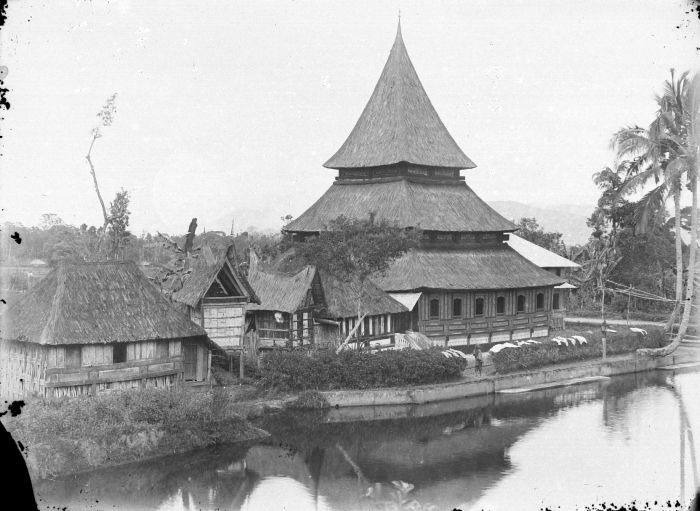
Bingkudu Mosque with surrounding pond and buildings during 1890–1916

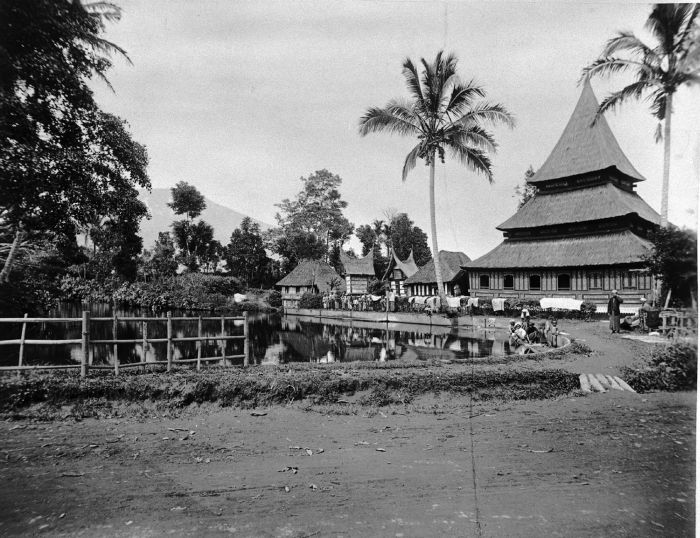
Bingkudu Mosque with surrounding pond and buildings during 1890–1916

== See also ==
- Jami Mosque of Taluak
- List of oldest mosques in Indonesia
- Vernacular mosque architecture in Indonesia
