= Regency seat =

Capital or seat of government and administrative regency

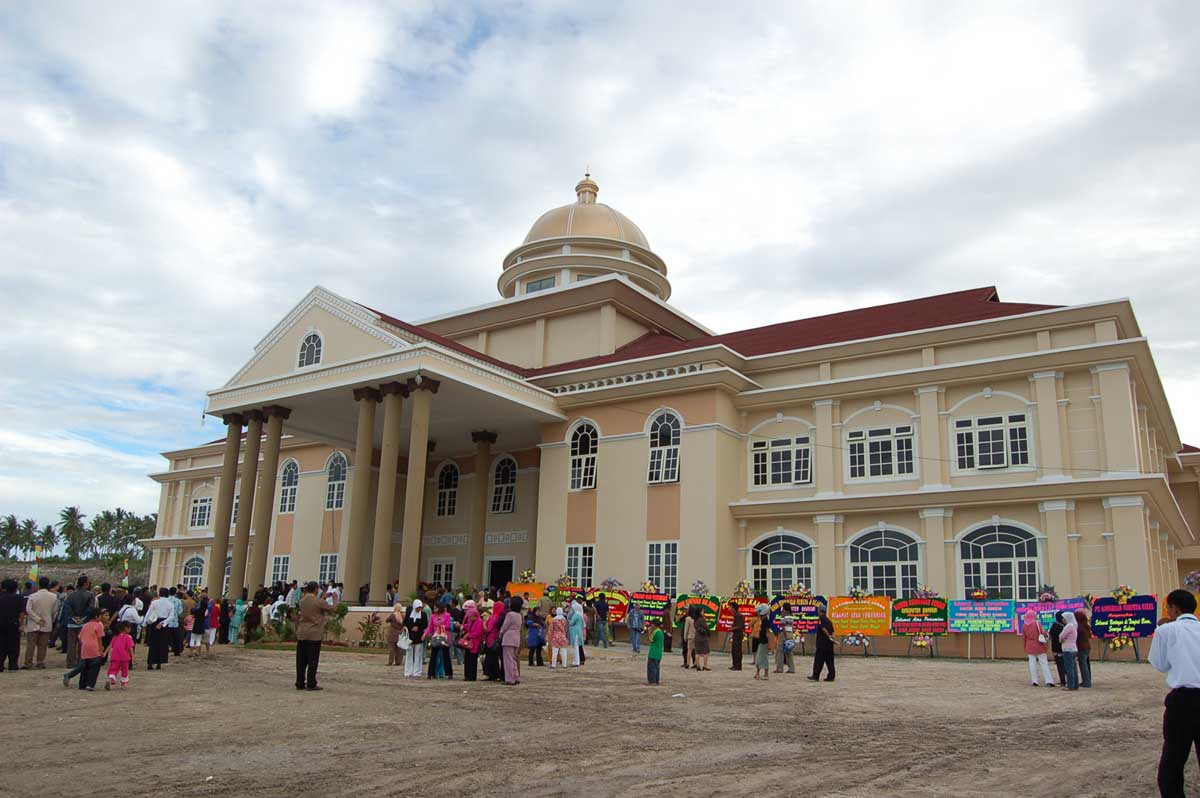
Regent office of Banggai Regency in Luwuk, Central Sulawesi

A regency seat (Indonesian: Ibu kota kabupaten) is a capital or seat of government of a regency in Indonesia. It is roughly equivalent of county seat in the United States or county town in the United Kingdom. Legally, regency seats are not administrative subdivisions of Indonesia and have no official boundaries. A regency seat may occupy an entire district (such as Sigli in Pidie Regency, Ngawi (town) in Ngawi Regency), a part of district (such as Sarilamak in Harau district, Lima Puluh Kota Regency), or several districts (such as Ungaran, which consists of West Ungaran district and East Ungaran district in Semarang Regency).

The regent offices in most Indonesian regencies usually have traditional design representing a Region, although dome in a roof sometimes can be added in some Indonesian regent offices, resembling a U.S. state capitol or a county courthouse.
