= Simpang Ampek =

Coordinates: 0°06′N 99°49′E

Simpang Ampek (or Simpang Empat) is a town and administrative district in West Pasaman Regency, in the West Sumatra province of Indonesia and it is the seat (capital) of West Pasaman Regency.
