= Lubuk Sikaping =

Coordinates: 0°09′N 100°10′E

Population
  - Total: 53,150
  - Density: 153/km^{2} (400/sq mi)

Lubuk Sikaping is a town and district in Pasaman Regency, of West Sumatra province of Indonesia, and it is the seat (capital) of Pasaman Regency. In mid 2023, the district had an estimated population of 53,150. The demonym of the citizen of this town is Luxican.
