= Ramlan Nurmatias =

M. Ramlan Nurmatias
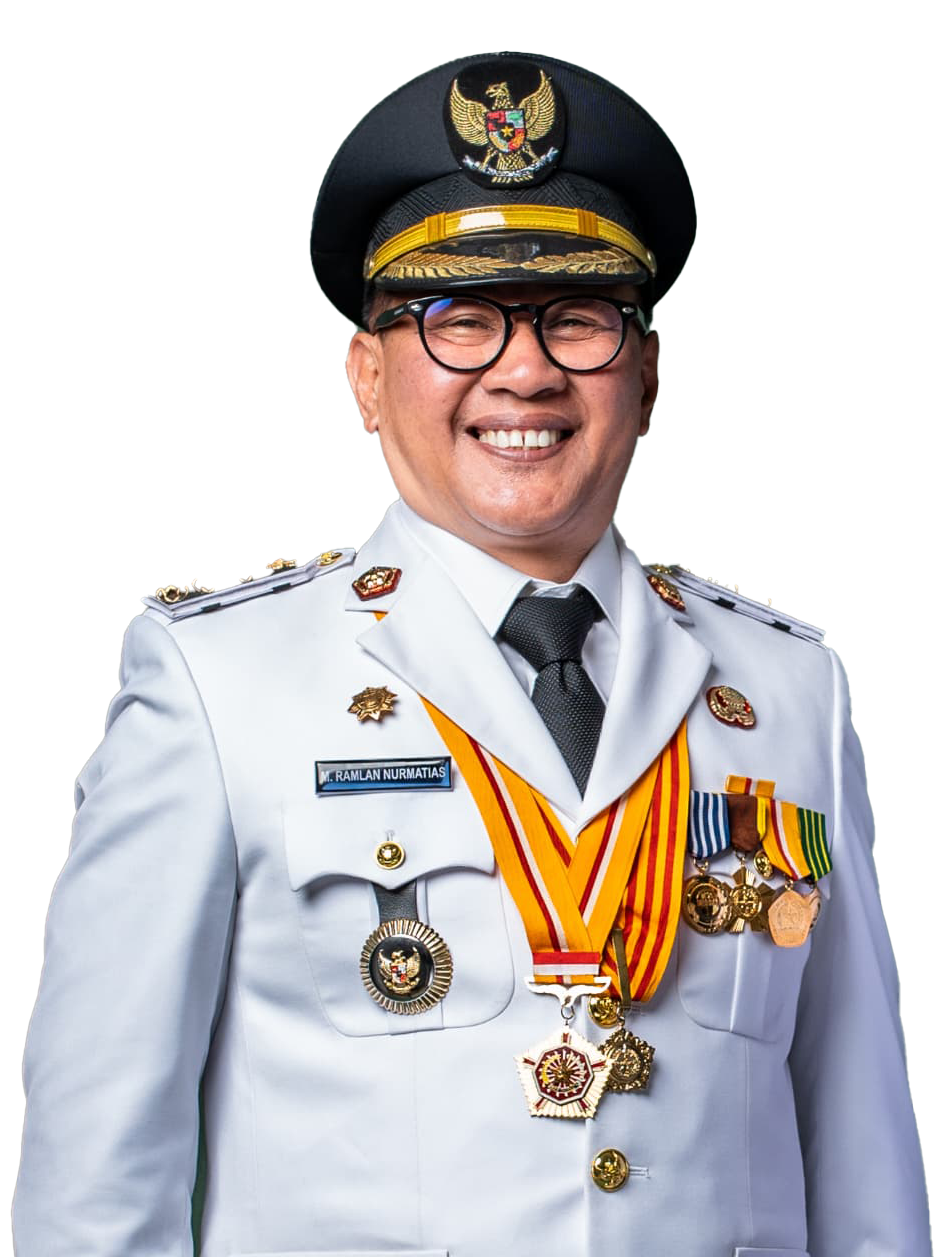

21st and 23rd Mayor of Bukittinggi
- Incumbent
- Assumed office 20 February 2025
- President: Prabowo Subianto
- Governor: Mahyeldi Ansharullah
- Preceded by: Erman Safar
- In office 17 February 2016 – 17 February 2021
- President: Joko Widodo
- Governor: Irwan Prayitno
- Preceded by: Ismet Amzis
- Succeeded by: Yuen Karnova (acting); Erman Safar

Personal details
- Born: August 10, 1964 (age 62) Bukittinggi, West Sumatra
- Party: Demokrat (since 2022)
- Spouse: Yesi Endriani
- Children: 2
- Education: Muhammadiyah University of West Sumatra

Ramlan Nurmatias (born August 10, 1964) is an Indonesian politician and businessman who served as mayor of Bukittinggi from 2016 to 2021 and continued from 2025 to present. He was inaugurated by Indonesian President Prabowo Subianto on February 20, 2025 at the State Palace in Jakarta.

== Career ==
Ramlan owns a number of companies. These include PT Emeral Group in 2000, PT Mahkota Sakato Utama in 1989, PT Sugit Sanjaya Prima in 2000, and PT Putra Anak Nagari in 2013.

== Politician ==
Ramlan joined the Demokrat and was appointed Chairman of the Demokrat Party Branch Leadership Council for Bukittinggi City in 2022.

In 2024, the simultaneous regional head elections throughout Indonesia including Bukittinggi City. Ramlan gave the last chance to run for mayor of Bukittinggi with the Ibnu Asis pair supported by the Demokrat, PKS and PAN. He managed to win after being defeated by incumbent candidate Erman Safar with 31,480 votes with a percentage of 51.69%.
