= Pasaman Regency =

Regency in West Sumatra, Indonesia

Pasaman Regency Kabupaten Pasaman
- Regency
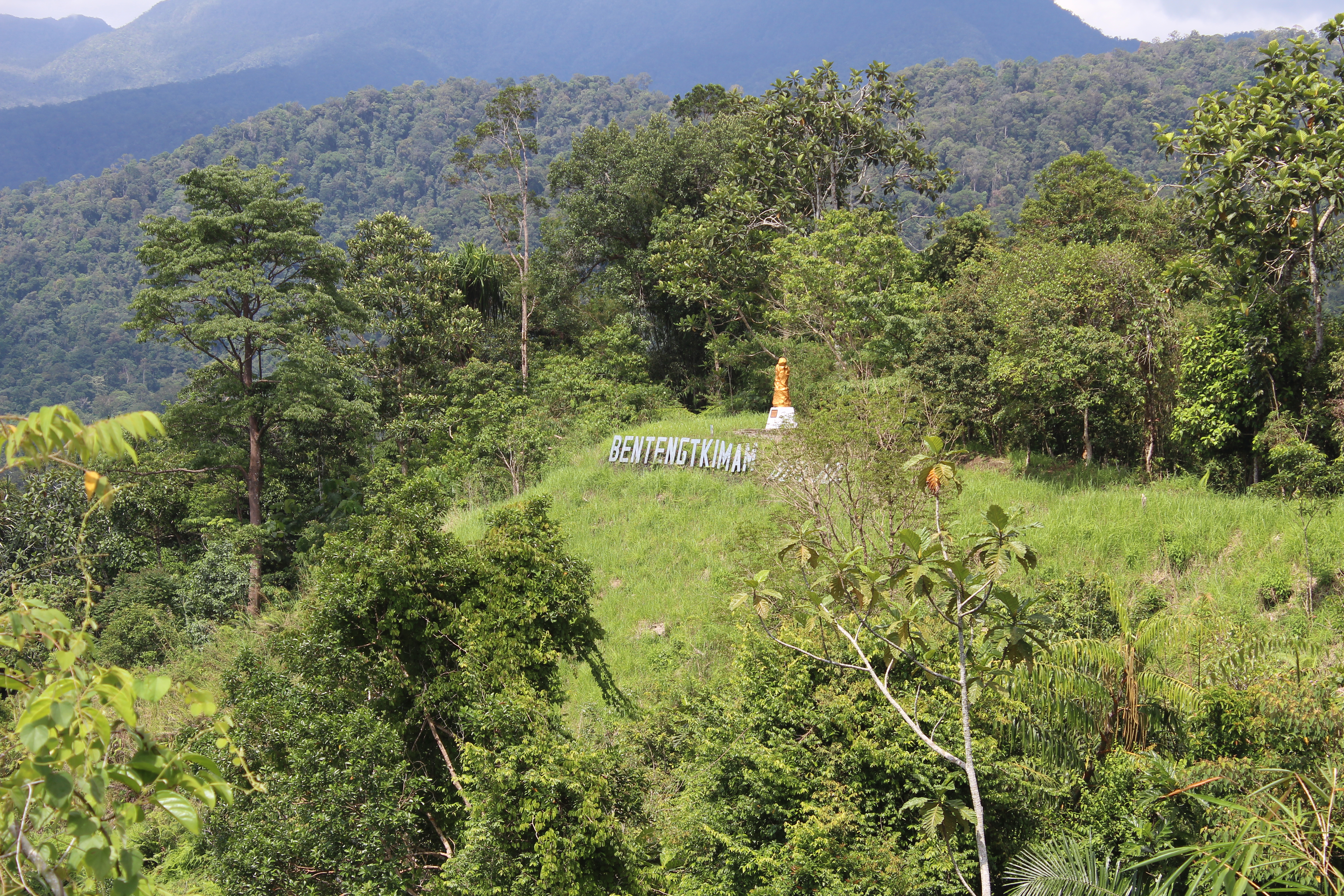
- Bukit Tajadi Fort

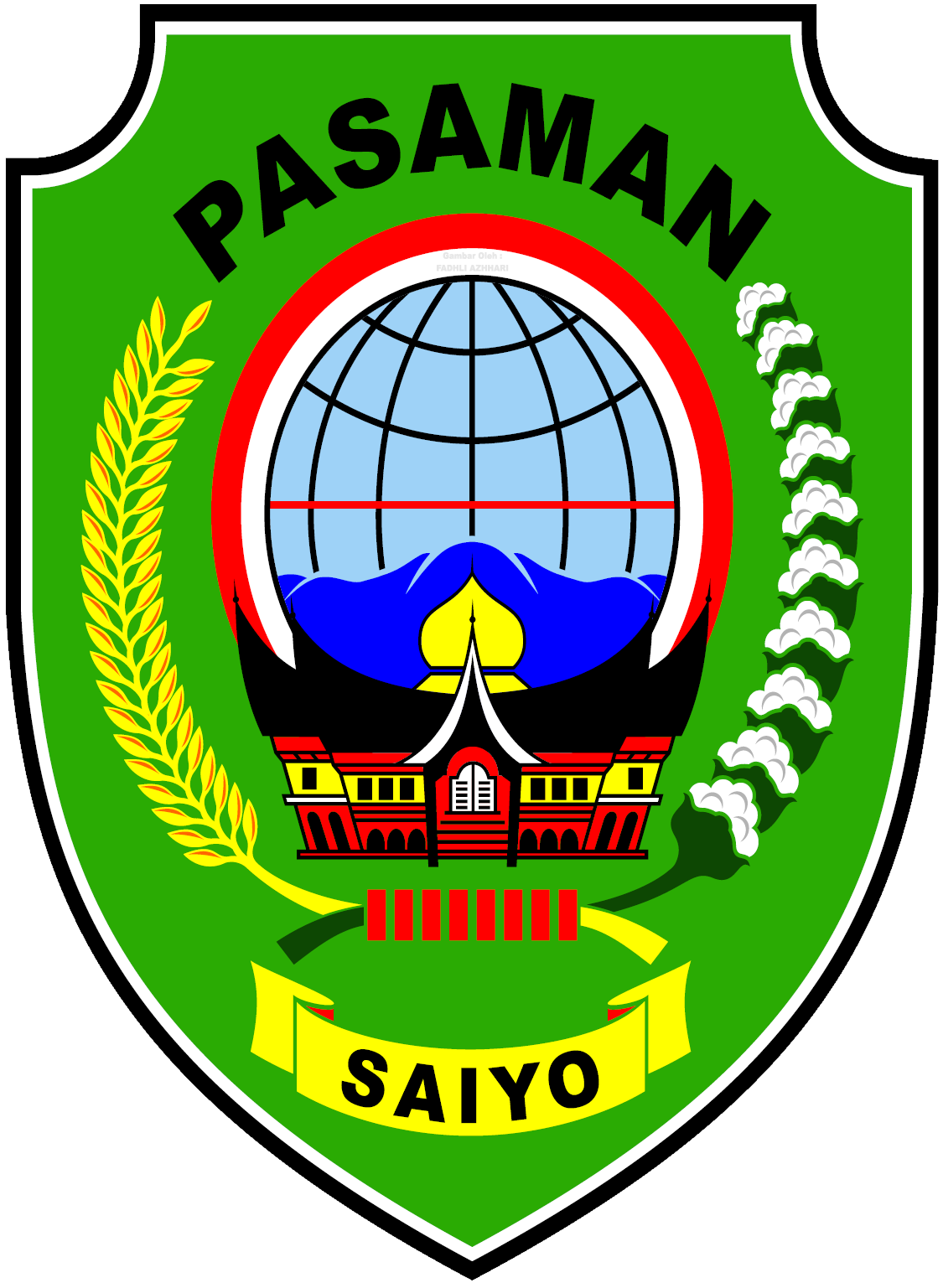
- Coat of arms
- Motto: Saiyo (Agree together)
- Location within West Sumatra

- Location in Sumatra and Indonesia Pasaman Regency (Indonesia)
- Coordinates: 0.166667°N 100.117°E
- Country: Indonesia
- Province: West Sumatra
- Regency seat: Lubuk Sikaping

Government
  - Regent: Welly Suhery
  - Vice Regent: Parulian Dalimunthe

Area
  - Total: 3,947.63 km^{2} (1,524.19 sq mi)

Population (mid 2025 estimate)
  - Total: 322,930
  - Density: 81.804/km^{2} (211.87/sq mi)
- Time zone: UTC+7 (IWST)
- Area code: (+62) 753
- Website: pasamankab.go.id

Pasaman Regency is a land-locked regency (kabupaten) in the north of West Sumatra province of Indonesia. It has a land area of 3,947.63 square kilometres (1,524.19 sq mi) and had a population of 252,981 at the 2010 Census and 299,851 at the 2020 Census; the official estimate as of mid 2025 was 322,930 (comprising 163,130 males and 159,810 females). The regency seat is the town of Lubuk Sikaping.

Pasaman is located in the north of West Sumatra. The town of Bonjol, birthplace of Tuanku Imam Bonjol, is notable for being the area where the Trans-Sumatran Highway crosses the equator. Although the majority ethnic group in West Sumatra is Minangkabau, in Pasaman Regency there is another substantial ethnic group, the Mandailing from North Sumatra; this is particularly true of the most northern districts within the regency which together form a geographical projection into North Sumatra, namely Rao, Rao Utara, Rao Selatan and Mapat Tunggul Districts. Consequently the name "Pasaman" means "equality" between the two groups in the Minangkabau language (Indonesian: Persamaan). The first Vice-Regent of Pasaman was H. Ahmad Dahlan Nasution from Duo Koto, King of Sontang (kingdom of Mandailing in Pasaman).

== Administrative districts ==
Pasaman Regency is divided into twelve districts (kecamatan), listed below with their areas and their populations at the 2010 Census and the 2020 Census, together with the official estimates as of mid 2025. The table also includes the locations of the district administrative centres, the number of administrative villages (nagari) in each district, and its post code.

Name of District (kecamatan)	Area in km^{2}	Pop'n Census 2010	Pop'n Census 2020	Pop'n Estimate mid 2025	Admin centre	No. of villages (nagari)	Post code
Tigo Nagari	352.92	22,997	29,943	33,750	Ladang Panjung	5	26358
Bonjol	194.32	23,184	26,282	27,710	Parit	5	26381
Simpang Alahan Mati	69.56	10,580	12,384	13,260	Alahan Mati	4	26382
Lubuk Sikaping	346.50	43,746	51,092	54,640	Lubuk Sikaping	13	26318
Dua Koto	360.63	24,602	28,709	30,690	Simpang Andilan	7	26311
Panti	194.50	35,412	34,519	37,280	Panti	7	26351
Padang Gelugur	178.40	21,341	32,724	35,140	Tapus	4	26352
Rao	236.18	22,168	26,041	27,930	Rao	5	26355
Rao Utara (North Rao)	598.63	10,293	12,052	12,910	Koto Rajo	4	26357
Rao Selatan (South Rao)	338.98	21,600	26,192	28,530	Lansek Kadok	2	26356
Mapat Tunggul	605.29	8,846	10,165	10,790	Lubuk Gadang	6	26353
Mapat Tunggul Selatan	471.72	8,530	9,748	10,320	Silayang	3	26354
Totals	3,947.63	253,299	299,851	322,930	Lubuk Sikaping	62	
