= West Pasaman Regency =

Regency in West Sumatra, Indonesia

West Pasaman Regency Kabupaten Pasaman Barat
- Regency
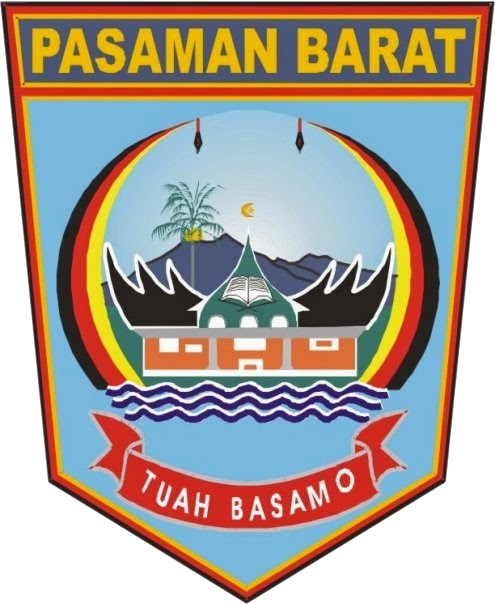
- Coat of arms
- Motto: Tuah Basamo (Prioritising the consensus)
- Location within West Sumatra

- Location in Sumatra and Indonesia West Pasaman Regency (Indonesia)
- Coordinates: 0.28152°N 99.51965°E
- Country: Indonesia
- Province: West Sumatra
- Regency seat: Simpang Ampek

Government
  - Regent: Yulianto
  - Vice Regent: M. Ihpan

Area
  - Total: 3,887.77 km^{2} (1,501.08 sq mi)

Population (mid 2025 estimate)
  - Total: 461,867
  - Density: 118.800/km^{2} (307.691/sq mi)
- Time zone: UTC+7 (IWST)
- Area code: (+62) 753
- Website: pasamanbaratkab.go.id

West Pasaman Regency (Indonesian: Kabupaten Pasaman Barat; pronounced [kabuˌpat̪ɛn paˈsaman ˈbarat̪̚]) is a regency (kabupaten) of West Sumatra province of Indonesia. The most northerly of the coastal regencies within the province, it has a land area of 3,887.77 km^{2}. It had a population of 365,129 at the 2010 Census and 431,672 at the 2020 Census; the official estimate as of mid 2025 was 461,867 (comprising 232,497 males and 229,370 females). The seat of the regency administration is the town of Simpang Ampek.

== History ==
Pasaman Barat Regency was created by decision of Parliament No. 38 of 2003 and at that time comprised seven districts - Sungai Beremas, Ranah Batahan, Lembah Melintang, Gunung Tuleh, Pasaman, Kinali and Talamau Districts. Subsequently, based on decision of Regional Law No. 4 of 2003, this was increased by four new districts - Koto Balingka, Sungai Aur, Sasak Ranah Pasisie and Luhak Nan Duo.

== Administrative districts ==
West Pasaman Regency is divided into eleven districts (kecamatan), tabulated below with their areas and their populations at the 2010 Census and the 2020 Census, together with the official estimates as of mid 2025. The table also includes the location of the district administrative centres, the number of administrative villages (nagari) in each district, and its post code.

Name of District (kecamatan)	Area in km^{2}	Pop'n Census 2010	Pop'n Census 2020	Pop'n Estimate mid 2025	Admin centre	No. of villages (nagari)	Post code
Sungai Beremas ^{(a)}	440.48	22,345	27,556	30,423	Air Bangih	1	26573
Ranah Batahan	354.88	23,483	27,481	29,987	Silaping	7	26366
Koto Balingka	340.78	26,048	30,550	32,678	Parit	6	26572
Sungai Aur	420.16	30,846	36,031	37,041	Koto Dalam	7	26574
Lembah Melintang	263.77	41,924	49,289	52,841	Ujung Gading	9	26570
Gunung Tuleh	453.97	20,315	24,166	26,465	Simpang Tigo Alin	7	26571
Talamau	324.24	25,871	29,805	31,547	Talu	7	26561
Pasaman	508.93	62,864	77,102	82,304	Simpang Ampek	16	26566
Luhak Nan Duo	174.21	37,409	44,084	47,068	Sungai Talang	9	26568
Sasak Ranah Pasisie	123.71	13,233	14,946	16,112	Sasak	4	26367
Kinali	482.64	60,791	70,662	75,401	Kinali	17	26567
Totals	3,887.77	365,129	431,672	461,867	Simpang Ampek	90	

Note: (a) includes 9 offshore islands.

== Airport ==
Pusako Anak Nagari Airport is an airport that is located in Luhak Nan Duo district of the West Pasaman Regency.

== Mount Talamau ==
Talamau Peak (2,900 masl) can be accessed from Bundaran Simpang Ampek Pasaman vice versa in two or three days trip and located at Jorong Pinagar Nagari Aur Kuning, Pasaman District, West Pasaman Regency. Mount Talamau has more than 10 waterfalls and at around the peak there are also more than 10 lakes surrounding by many kinds of colourful flowers.
