= Sarilamak =

Coordinates: 0°09′S 100°40′E

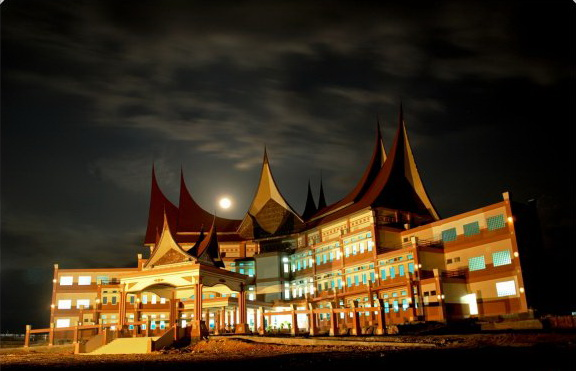
Office building of Lima Puluh Kota Regency

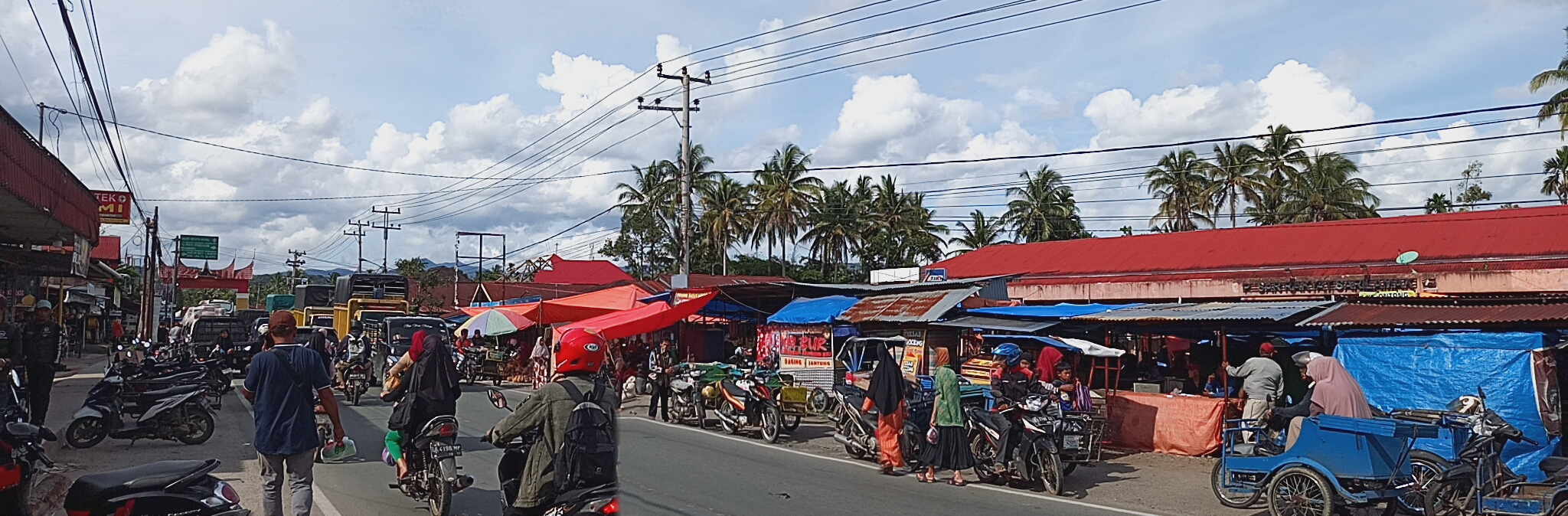
Sarilamak traditional market on its market day (Saturday)

Sarilamak is a town in Lima Puluh Kota Regency, of West Sumatra province of Indonesia and it is the administrative seat (capital) of Lima Puluh Kota Regency.
