= Benni Warlis =

Indonesian politician

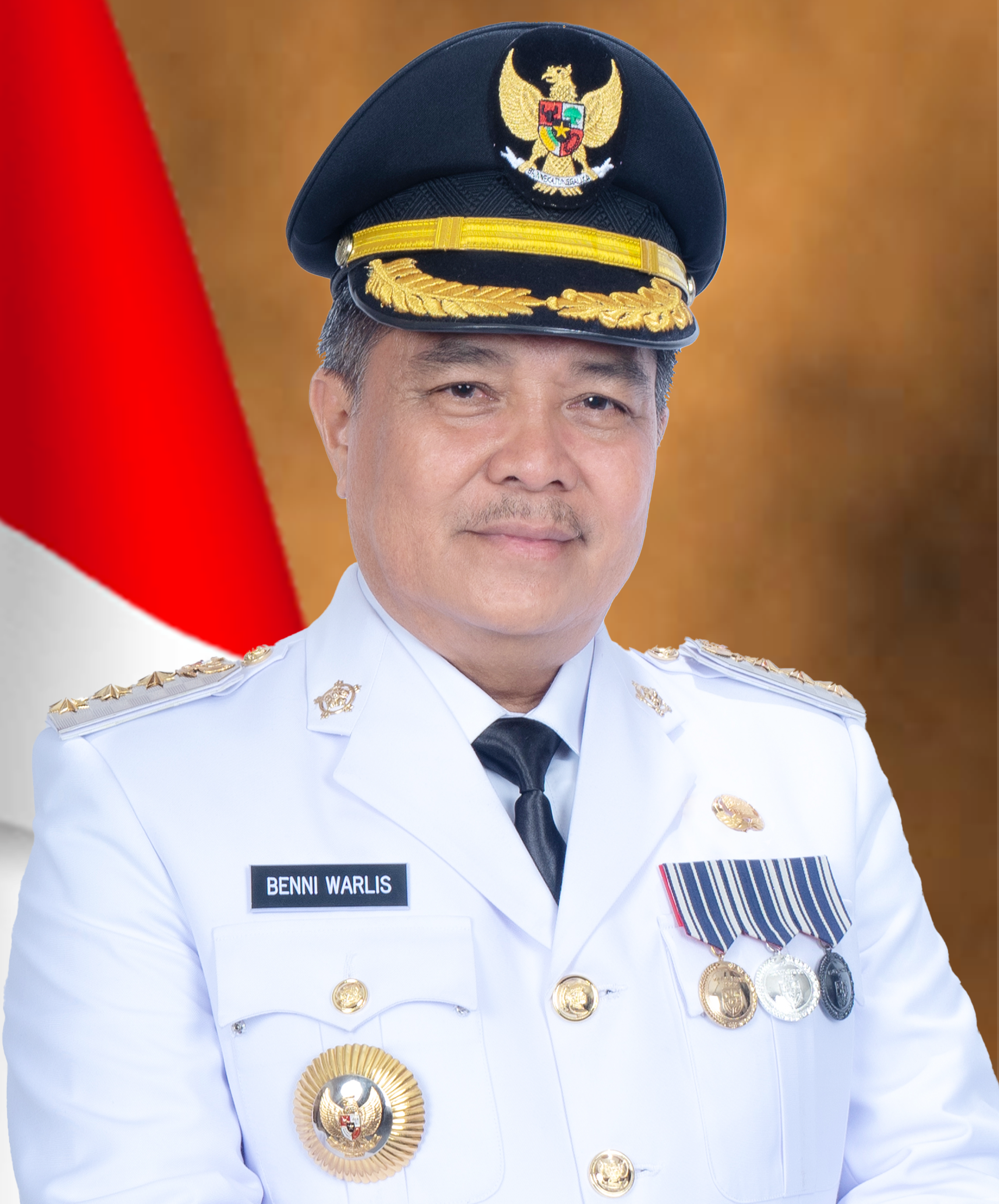

21st Regent of Agam
- Incumbent
- Assumed office 20 February 2025
- Preceded by: Andri Warman

Secretary Regional of West Sumatra
- In office 16 April 2021 – 12 August 2021
- Preceded by: Alwis
- Succeeded by: Hansastri

Personal details
- Born: October 4, 1962 (age 64) Panampuang, Ampek Angkek, Agam, West Sumatra
- Party: Independent
- Spouse: Merry Yuliesday
- Children: 2
- Education: Andalas University; Sekolah Tinggi Manajemen Labora Jakarta
- Profession: Bureaucrat, Politician

Benni Warlis is an Indonesian politician and retired bureaucrat who serves as the Regent of Agam, currently inaugurated on February 20, 2025 by the Indonesian President Prabowo Subianto at the State Palace, Jakarta.

== Career ==
Benni Warlis was born in Payobadar, Payakumbuh on October 4, 1962. He started his career as a field officer for the PSP2DT Project of the West Sumatra Diperta, and was appointed as a Candidate for Civil Servants (CPNS) in 1989, and worked his way up in the bureaucracy until retiring in 2022 with his last position as Expert Staff to the Governor of West Sumatra for Development, Community and Human Resources. He has also been the President Commissioner of Bank Nagari from 2021 to 2024. Benni Warlis was elected Regent of Agam on February 20, 2025 with the handover ceremony taking place on March 3, 2025.

== Honours ==
- Satyalancana Karya Satya (Civil Servants' Long Service Medal), (30 years)
- Satyalancana Karya Satya (Civil Servants' Long Service Medal), (20 years)
- Satyalancana Karya Satya (Civil Servants' Long Service Medal), (10 years)
