= Annisa Suci Ramadhani =

Indonesian politician and lawyer (born 1990)

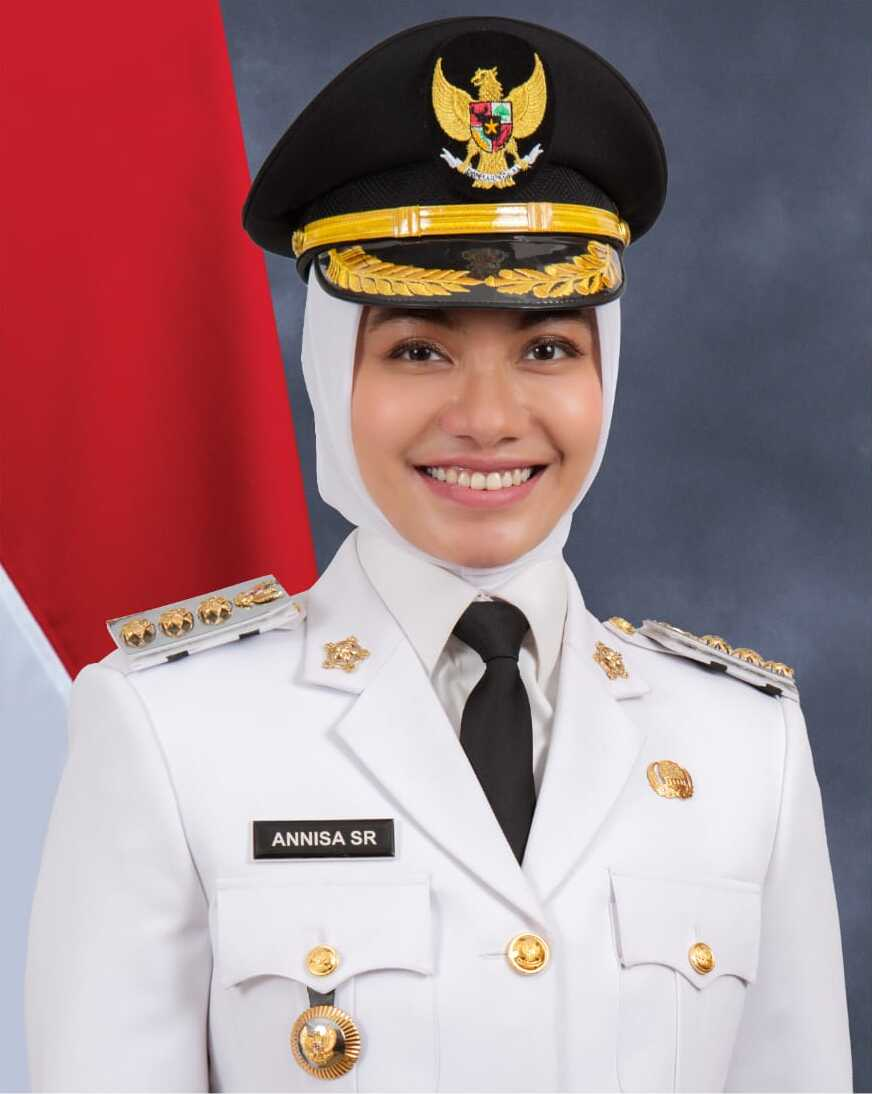
- Official portrait, 2025

Regent of Dharmasraya
- Incumbent
- Assumed office 20 February 2025
- Governor: Mahyeldi Ansharullah
- Deputy: Leli Arni
- Preceded by: Sutan Riska Tuanku Kerajaan

Personal details
- Born: 19 April 1990 (age 36) Padang, West Sumatra, Indonesia
- Party: Gerindra Party
- Education: University of Indonesia; Columbia Law School
- Occupation: Politician; lawyer

Annisa Suci Ramadhani (born 19 April 1990) is an Indonesian politician and lawyer who is serving as the current regent of Dharmasraya since 2025. A member of the Gerindra Party, she is the first woman to serve as a regent in the province of West Sumatra.

== Early life ==
Annisa Suci Ramadhani was born in the city of Padang, West Sumatra, on 19 April 1990. She is the second daughter of Marlon Martua Situmeang who served as the regent of Dharmasraya from 2005 until 2010. Annisa studied law and pursued a Bachelor of Laws degree at the University of Indonesia, graduating in 2012. She then continued her studies abroad, going to Columbia Law School to pursue a Master of Laws degree. After graduating, she returned to Indonesia.

While in college, Annisa is active at the Asian Law Students' Association University of Indonesia, the Business Law Student Association of University of Indonesia, the Law and Economics Society, and the Columbia Outdoors Club.

== Career ==
In 2013, Annisa began her career as a member of the Legal Aid. In the same year, she became a Trainee Associate in the banking and finance law practice group at Hadiputranto, Hadinoto & Partners (Baker & McKenzie). A year later, in April 2014, she became a Managing Associate at Melli Darsa & Co (PricewaterhouseCoopers) in the banking, finance and capital market law, a position she held until March 2021. She passed the Indonesian Advocates Association bar exam in 2018. From January 2018 to August 2019, she was appointed as a special staff member to the Speaker of the House of Representatives (DPR RI). She also served as a special staff member at Commission XI of the DPR RI.

In the 2024 Dharmasraya regency election, Annisa ran as a candidate for regent with Leli Arni as her deputy. The pair was supported by almost all political parties in Dharmasraya Regency. As the sole candidate, they won securing 65,922 votes or 69.53 percent. They were inaugurated by Prabowo Subianto, along with hundreds of regional leaders from across Indonesia, on 20 February 2025, at the Istana Negara in Jakarta. She was the first woman to serve as an elected regional head in West Sumatra.

=== As regent ===
In September 2025, Annisa launched a scholarship program aimed at providing scholarships to 2,000 students annually. She also started a car free day event at the regency seat of Pulau Punjung in April 2026.

As her economic program, she called for the further development of coffee and oil palm plantations. In May 2026, in response to a drop in the prices of oil palm bunches due to newly announced export regulations, the regency government under Annisa issued a circular to palm oil factories instructing them against reducing their purchase price. Annisa accused the factories of taking advantage of the transitional period for the export regulations, which according to her still had not affected exports.
