= Agam Regency =

Regency in West Sumatra, Indonesia

Agam Regency Kabupaten Agam
- Regency
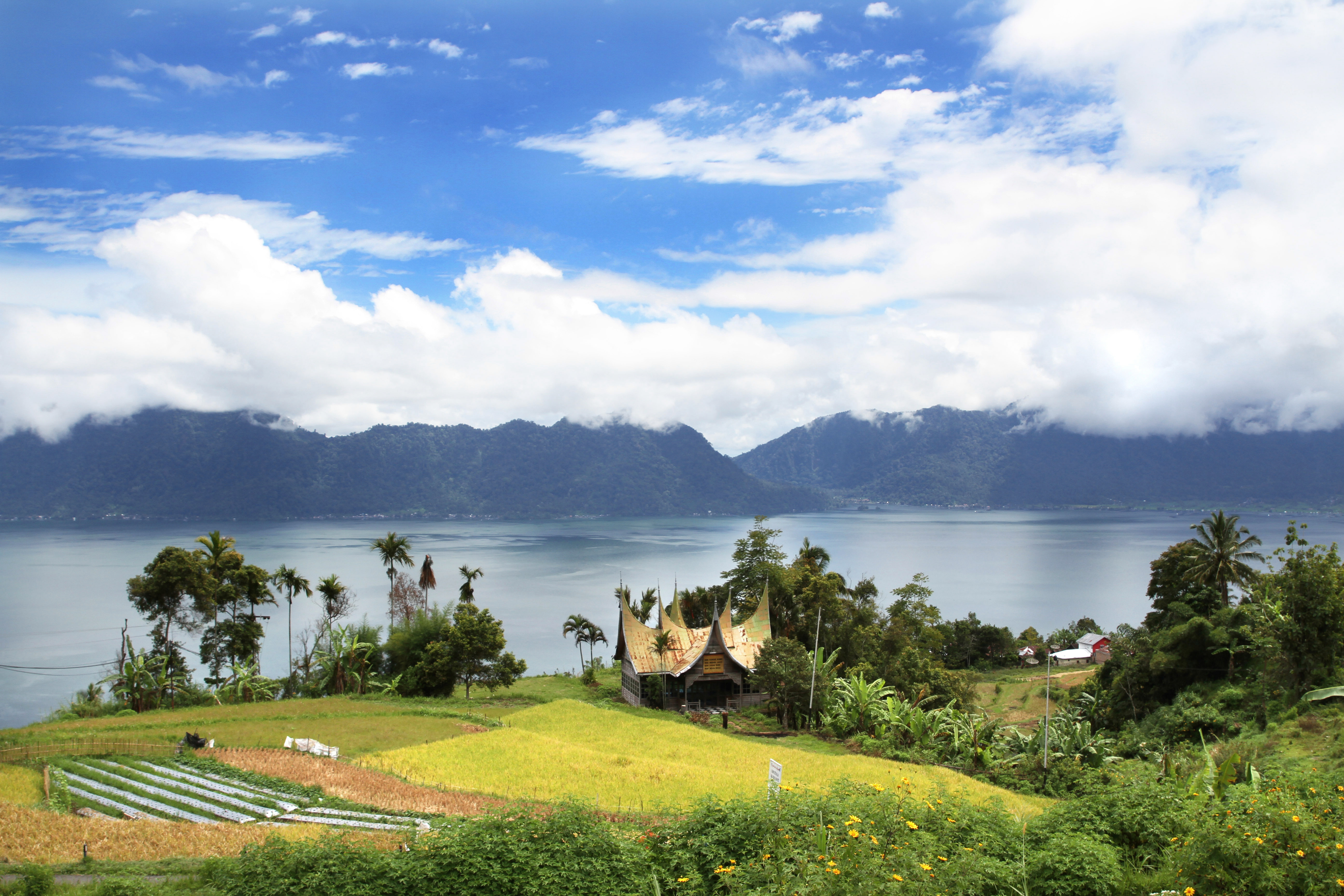
- View of Lake Maninjau

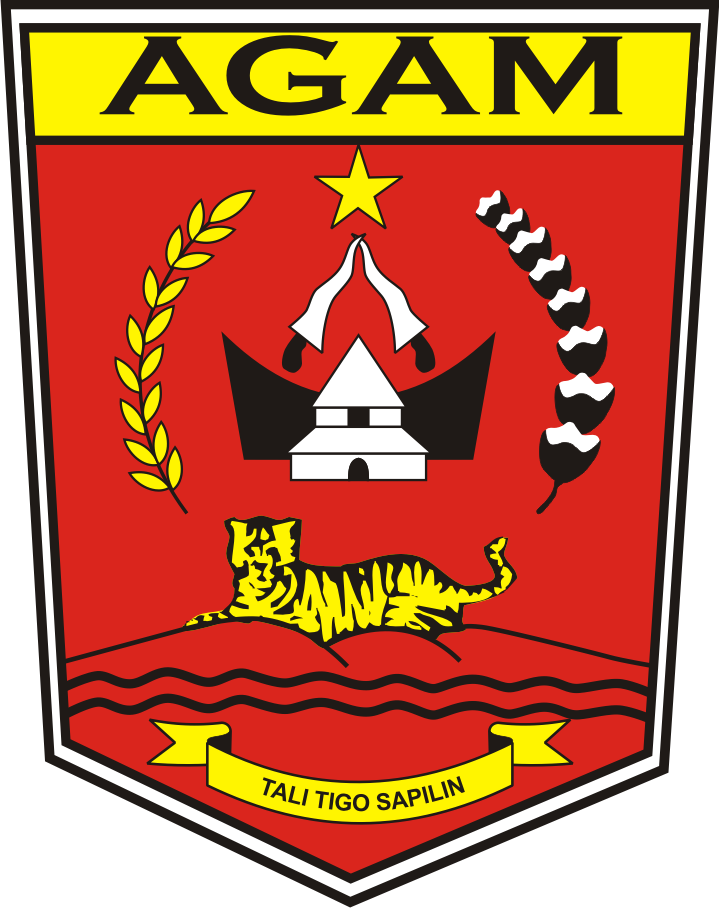
- Coat of arms
- Motto: Tali Tigo Sapilin (Three ropes in a bond, i.e. three leadership components of the people forming a unity)
- Location within West Sumatra

- Location in Sumatra and Indonesia Agam Regency (Indonesia)
- Coordinates: 0.266667°S 100°E
- Country: Indonesia
- Province: West Sumatra
- Regency seat: Lubuk Basung

Government
  - Regent: Benni Warlis
  - Vice Regent: Muhammad Iqbal

Area
  - Total: 2,226.27 km^{2} (859.57 sq mi)
- Highest elevation: 2,891 m (9,485 ft)
- Lowest elevation: 0 m (0 ft)

Population (mid 2025 estimate)
  - Total: 534,173
  - Density: 239.941/km^{2} (621.444/sq mi)
- Time zone: UTC+7 (IWST)
- Area code: (+62) 752
- Website: agamkab.go.id

Agam Regency (Indonesian: Kabupaten Agam) is a regency of West Sumatra, Indonesia. It has an area of 2,226.27 km^{2} and had a population of 454,853 at the 2010 census and 529,138 at the 2020 census; the official estimate as of mid 2025 was 534,173 (comprising 267,337 males and 266,836 females). The regency seat is the town of Lubuk Basung. Bukittinggi city is surrounded by this regency but is not administratively included in it.

Lake Maninjau, a crater lake, is a well-known landmark of the regency, and is used as a site for paragliding. This lake is also a primary tourist destination in West Sumatra.

== History ==
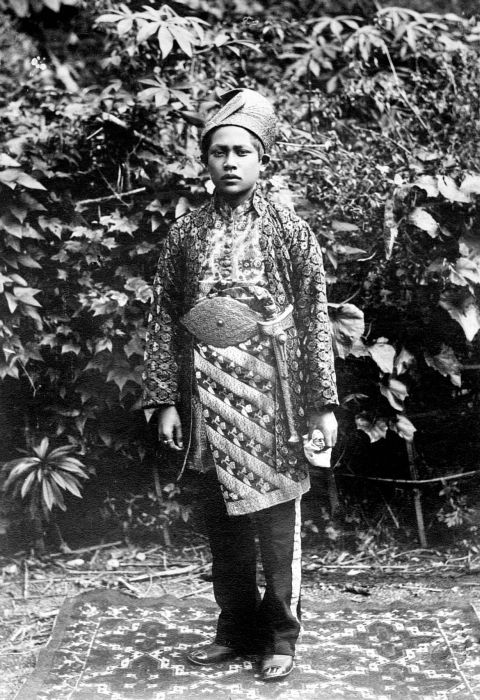
Bridegroom from Soengai Poear in a photo by Christiaan Benjamin Nieuwenhuis

This regency was founded to include a collection of several villages that existed in the region of Luhak Agam, during the rule of the Dutch East Indies. Bukittinggi was named as the regency capital at that time. After Bukittinggi was created as an independent city outside of the regency, based on Government Regulation No. 8 of 1998, on 7 January 1998, the Agam Regency's capital was officially moved to Lubuk Basung.

== Geography ==
Geographically this regency located between 00°01’ 34” and 00°28’ 43” South, and between 99°46’ 39” and 100°32’ 50” East. It is located in the mountainous region which is formed between two river basins, Batang Agam in the north and Batang Sri Antokan in the south.

West area is flat to gently sloping (0-8%), reaching 71,956 ha, while the central and eastern regions which are wavy and hilly to very steep slopes (> 45%) with a total area of 129,352 ha. Regions with a very steep slope (> 45%) are at the Bukit Barisan range with the summit of Mount Merapi with a height of 2,891 metres, and Mount Singgalang with a height of 2,877 metres, in the south and southeast of Agam.

Also, in this region there is Lake Maninjau, a crater lake which has an area of 9,950 ha.

There is Sianok Canyon, a steep valley (ravine) located in the border of Bukittinggi and IV Koto Districts. The valley is long and winding as the southern border town of Koto Gadang canyon to the village Sianok Anam Tribe, and ended in Palupuh District. The scenery of Sianok canyon also became one of the mainstays of the provincial tourist attraction.

The regency shares land borders with Pasaman and West Pasaman to the north, Padang Pariaman and Tanah Datar to the south, Lima Puluh Kota to the east. It has a sea border with Indian Ocean to the west.

== Climate ==
Temperature consists of two kinds, low-lying areas with a minimum temperature of 25 °C and 33 °C maximum (in Lubuk Basung), whereas in the high areas of minimum 20 °C and maximum 29 °C (in Tilatang Kamang). Average humidity is 88%, wind speed between 4–20 km/hour and the average sun shines 58%.

== Administrative districts ==
Agam Regency is divided into sixteen districts (kecamatan), tabulated below with their areas and their populations at the 2010 census and the 2020 census, together with the official estimates as of mid 2025. The table also includes the location of the district administrative centres, the number of administrative villages (nagari) in each district, and its post code.

Name of District (kecamatan)	Area in km^{2}	Pop'n census 2010	Pop'n census 2020	Pop'n estimate mid 2025	Admin centre	No. of villages	Post code
Tanjung Mutiara ^{(a)}	205.73	28,239	33,050	34,738	Tiku	3	26473
Lubuk Basung	278.40	68,045	81,351	85,634	Manggopoh	5	26451
Ampek Nagari	268.69	22,543	30,498	30,900	Bawan	4	26161
Tanjung Raya	244.03	32,879	37,368	38,827	Maninjau	9	26471
Matur	93.69	17,058	19,116	19,670	Matur	6	26162
IV Koto	68.72	23,087	25,938	26,890	Balingka	7	26160
Malalak	104.49	9,265	10,644	10,720	Malalak	4	26163
Banuhampu	28.48	36,113	41,211	39,102	Sungai Buluh	7	26181
Sungai Pua	37.83	23,006	26,606	28,059	Limo Suku	5	26182
Ampek Angkek	30.66	43,110	46,396	45,769	Biaro	7	26190
Canduang	52.29	21,966	25,542	25,892	Lasi	3	26191
Baso	70.30	33,010	36,721	37,874	Baso	6	26192
Tilatang Kamang	95.86	34,151	40,901	37,559	Pakan Kamis	3	26153
Kamang Magek	99.61	20,055	22,649	22,215	Magek	3	26152
Palembayan	349.77	29,227	36,051	35,051	Palembayan	6	26164
Palupuh	236.34	13,095	15,096	15,273	Palupuh	4	26151
Totals	2,226.27	454,853	529,138	534,173	Lubuk Basung	82	

Note: (a) includes 2 offshore islands.

Each district is sub-divided into several administrative villages. There are 82 villages (nagari in Minangkabau term).

== Demography ==
The Agam Regency is populated mainly by the Minangkabau people, while other ethnic groups include Javanese and Batak.

== Economy ==
Economic growth is dominated by agricultural sector, accounted for 40.40% of GDP, followed by trade, hotels and restaurants by 15.30%, service sector 13.25%, and manufacturing industry 11.71%. Income per capita in 2008 is about Rp 12,000,000 or US$1,333.

== Tourism ==
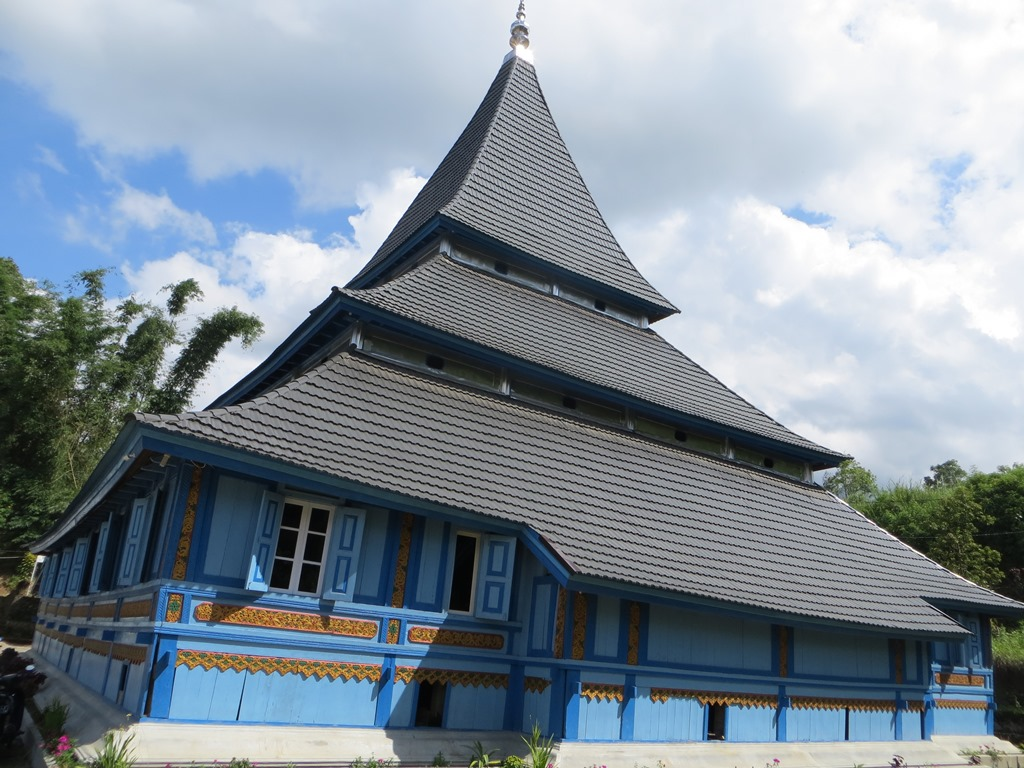
Bingkudu Mosque with traditional Minangkabau architectural style.

The development of tourism in Agam regency are generally divided into three regions:

1. West Region, focus on sea and coastal tourism, such as: fishery, recreational beaches and islands, diving/snorkeling, marine resources and marine culture, culinary tourism

2. Central Region, Lake Maninjau is dominant tourist destination in this region. Attraction is paragliding, off-road, racing river craft and others. There is nature tourism, in lake and mountain. Also cultural and history tourism such as Buya Hamka birth house.

3. Eastern region, focus on agrotourism such as fruits and cocoa plantation.

== Villages ==
- Lambah
