= Lubuk Basung =

Coordinates: 0°20′0″S 100°04′0″E

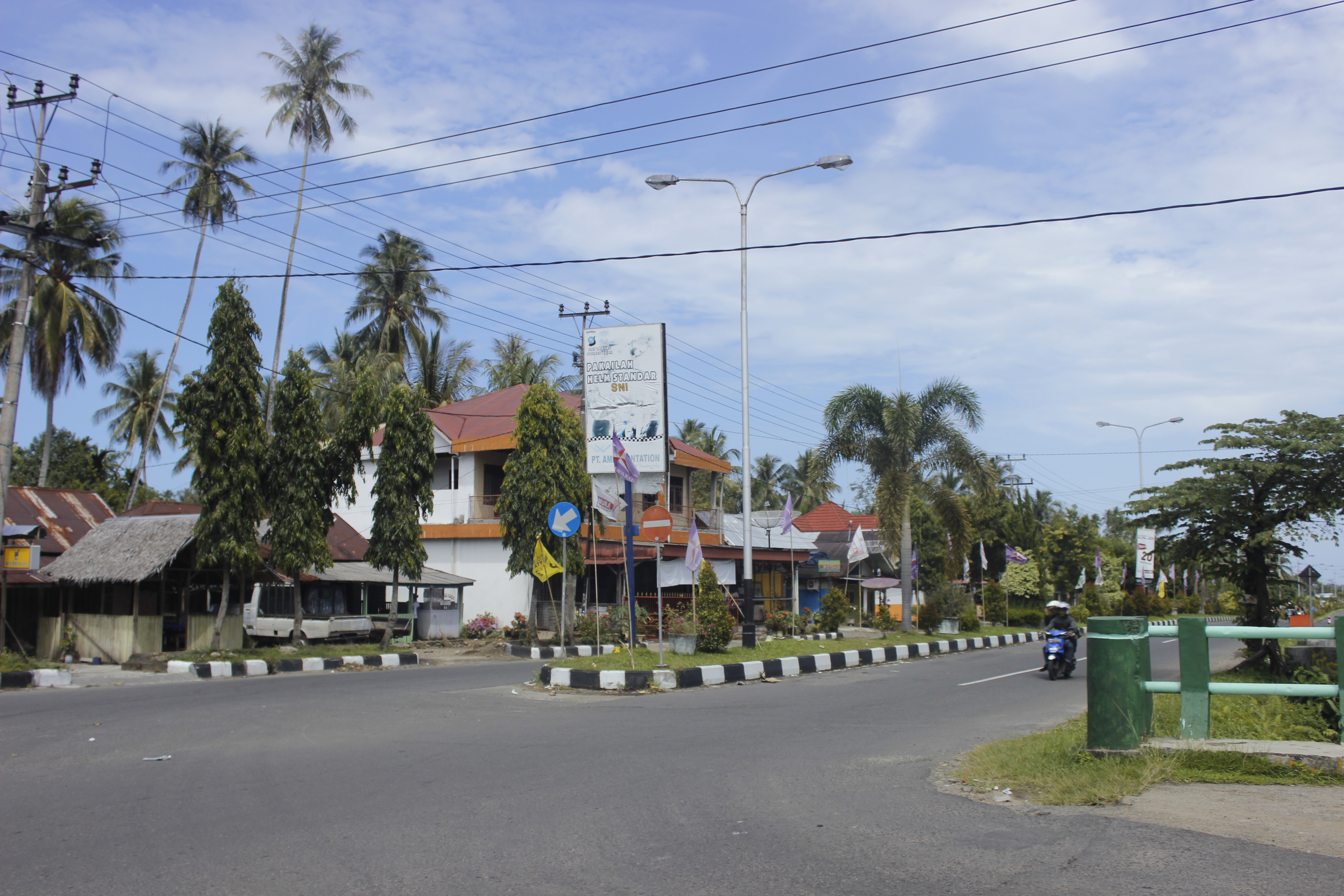
A street intersection at Lubuk Basung

Lubuk Basung is a town or Sub-district in Agam Regency, of West Sumatra province of Indonesia and it is the seat (capital) of Agam Regency.
