= Lima Puluh Kota Regency =

Regency in West Sumatra, Indonesia

Lima Puluh Kota Regency Kabupaten Lima Puluh Kota
- Regency
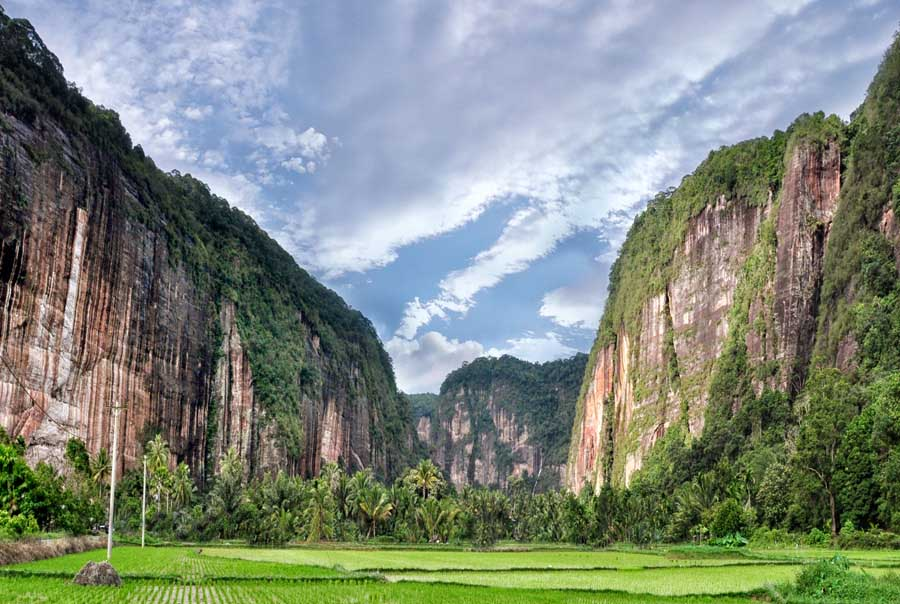
- Harau Canyon

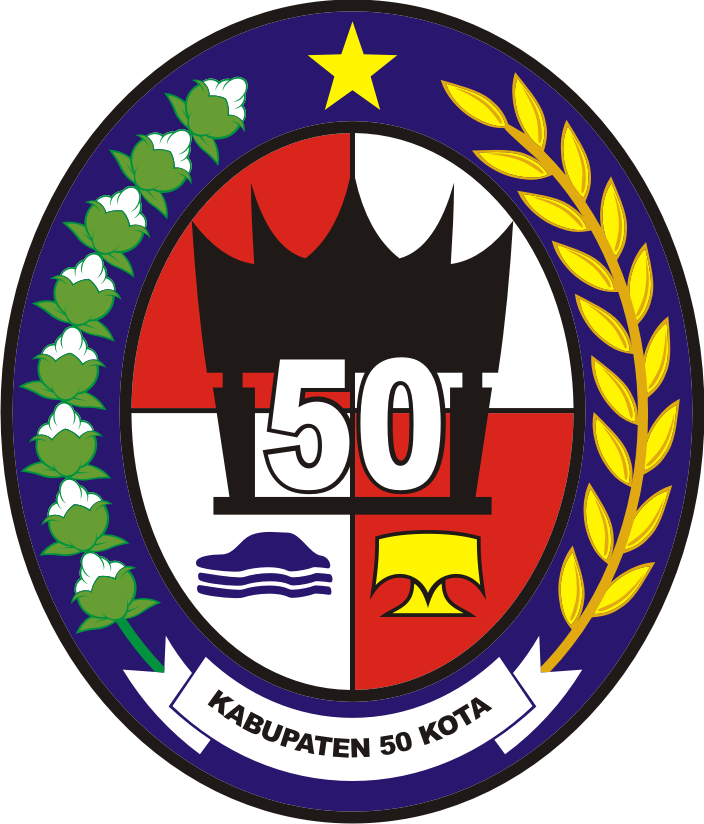
- Seal

- Location within West Sumatra

- Location in Sumatra and Indonesia Lima Puluh Kota Regency (Indonesia)
- Coordinates: 0.233333°S 100.633°E
- Country: Indonesia
- Province: West Sumatra
- Regency seat: Sarilamak

Government
  - Regent: Safni Sikumbang
  - Vice Regent: Ahlul Badrito Resha

Area
  - Total: 3,273.40 km^{2} (1,263.87 sq mi)

Population (mid 2025 estimate)
  - Total: 406,228
  - Density: 124.100/km^{2} (321.417/sq mi)
- Time zone: UTC+7 (IWST)
- Area code: (+62) 752
- Website: limapuluhkota.go.id

Lima Puluh Kota Regency (meaning fifty towns in the Malay language) is a regency (kabupaten) of West Sumatra province, Indonesia. It has an area of 3,273.40 km^{2} and a population of 348,249 according to the 2010 census and 383,525 according to the 2020 census; the official estimate as of mid 2025 was 406,228 (comprising 202,793 males and 203,435 females). The regency seat is the town of Sarilamak (in Harau District).

== Administration ==
Lima Puluh Kota Regency is divided into thirteen districts (kecamatan), listed below with their areas and their populations at the 2010 census and the 2020 census, together with the official estimates as of mid 2025. The table also includes the locations of the district administrative centres, the numbers of administrative villages (nagari) in each district, and its post codes.

Name of District (kecamatan)	Area in km^{2}	Pop'n 2010 census	Pop'n 2020 census	Pop'n mid 2025 estimate	Admin centre	No. of villages	Post code
Payakumbuh ^{(a)}	59.59	32,232	37,297	39,571	Kota Baru Simalangggang	7	26251
Akabiluru	111.31	25,419	28,558	30,665	Sariak Laweh	7	26252
Luak	45.98	25,458	28,133	30,174	Pakan Sabtu	4	26261
Lareh Sago Halaban	217.49	34,776	38,524	41,329	Pakan Raba'a	8	26262
Situjuah Limo Nagari	75.58	20,313	23,274	24,425	Situjuah Banda Dalam	5	26250
Harau	310.53	46,718	55,451	58,961	Tanjung Pati	11	26271
Guguak	95.27	33,980	35,878	37,476	Danguang-Dangaung	5	26253
Mungka	149.57	25,032	27,024	28,671	Padang Loweh	5	26254
Suliki	144.25	14,294	14,895	15,557	Suliki	6	26255
Bukik Barisan ^{(b)}	336.08	21,899	22,867	24,252	Banja Loweh	5	26257
Gunung Omeh ^{(c)}	147.33	12,516	14,019	14,694	Koto Tinggi	3	26256
Kapur IX	834.61	27,504	28,191	29,624	Muaro Paiti	7	26273
Pangkalan Koto Baru	745.81	28,414	29,414	30,829	Pangkalan	6	26272
Totals	3,273.40	348,555	383,525	406,228	Sarilamak	79	

Notes: (a) meaning grassy swamp in the Minangkabau language; Payakumbuh District is not to be confused with Payakumbuh city, which is an enclave within the regency but no longer administratively part of it.
(b) meaning row of hills in the Minangkabau language. (c) meaning golden mountain in the Minangkabau language.

== Harau Canyon ==
Harau Canyon is known as the Indonesian Yosemite. There are four waterfalls here with heights of 50 - 90 metres. The cliffs are around 80 to 300 metres high and (rope) climbing guides are available.

== Butterfly Park ==
Since 1 January 2012, Also known as Barayun Butterfly Park near Harau Canyon has opened for free. Butterfly breeding cages are still in preparation along with some animals as a mini zoo.

== Kelok Sembilan Bridge ==
Kelok Sembilan Bridge which connects West Sumatra Province and Riau Province at 143-148 kilometres was officially opened on 31 October 2013. Kelok Sembilan Bridge is also called Kelok Sembilan Overpass, because it is over the old Kelok 44. The first stage of the bridge is 720 metres with a 4 kilometre long access road, the second stage is a 250 metre bridge with a 1 kilometre access road. The bridge is estimated to save vehicle and passenger costs of up to Rp134.5 billion per year. The bridge itself cost Rp550 billion ($49.5 million).
