= Architecture of Indonesia =

History and traditions of Indonesian architecture

The architecture of Indonesia reflects the diversity of cultural, historical, and geographic influences that have shaped Indonesia as a whole. Invaders, colonizers, missionaries, merchants, and traders brought cultural changes that had a profound effect on building styles and techniques.

Numbers of Indonesian vernacular houses have been developed throughout the archipelago. The traditional houses and settlements of the several hundred ethnic groups of Indonesia are extremely varied and all have their specific history. The houses hold social significance in society and demonstrate local ingenuity in their relations to the environment and spatial organisation.

Traditionally, the most significant foreign influence has been India. However, Chinese, Arab, and European influences have also played significant roles in shaping Indonesian architecture. Religious architecture varies from indigenous forms to mosques, temples, and churches. The sultans and other rulers built palaces. There is a substantial legacy of colonial architecture in Indonesian cities. Independent Indonesia has seen the development of new paradigms for postmodern and contemporary architecture.

== Traditional vernacular architecture ==
Ethnic groups in Indonesia are often associated with their distinctive form of rumah adat. The houses are at the centre of a web of customs, social relations, traditional laws, taboos, myths, and religions that bind the villagers together. The house provides the main focus for the family and its community and is the point of departure for many activities of its residents. Villagers build their own homes, or a community will pool their resources for a structure built under the direction of a master builder and/or a carpenter.

The majority of Indonesian peoples share a common Austronesian ancestry, and the traditional homes of Indonesia share several characteristics with houses from other Austronesian regions. The earliest Austronesian structures were communal timber longhouses on stilts, with steeply sloping roofs and heavy gables, as seen in, for example, the Batak rumah adat and the Torajan Tongkonan. Variations of the communal longhouse principle are found among the Dayak people of Borneo, as well as the Mentawai people.

The norm is for a post, beam, and lintel structural system that takes load straight to the ground with either wooden or bamboo walls that are non-load bearing. Traditionally, rather than nails, mortis and tenon joints and wooden pegs are used. Natural materials – timber, bamboo, thatch, and fibre – make up rumah adat. The traditional house of Nias has post, beam, and lintel construction with flexible nail-less joints, and non-load bearing walls are typical of rumah adat.

Traditional dwellings have developed to respond to Indonesia's hot and wet monsoon climate. As is common throughout South East Asia and the South West Pacific, most rumah adat are built on stilts, except Java and Bali. Building houses off the ground allows breezes to moderate the hot tropical temperatures; it elevates the dwelling above stormwater runoff and mud; it allows houses to be built on rivers and wetland margins; it keeps people, goods, and food from dampness and moisture; lifts living quarters above malaria-carrying mosquitos; and reduces the risk of dry rot and termites. The sharply inclined roof allows the heavy tropical rain to quickly sheet off, and large overhanging eaves keep water out of the house and provide shade in the heat. In hot and humid low-lying coastal regions, homes can have many windows providing good cross-ventilation, whereas in cooler mountainous interior areas, homes often have a vast roof and few windows.

=== Examples ===
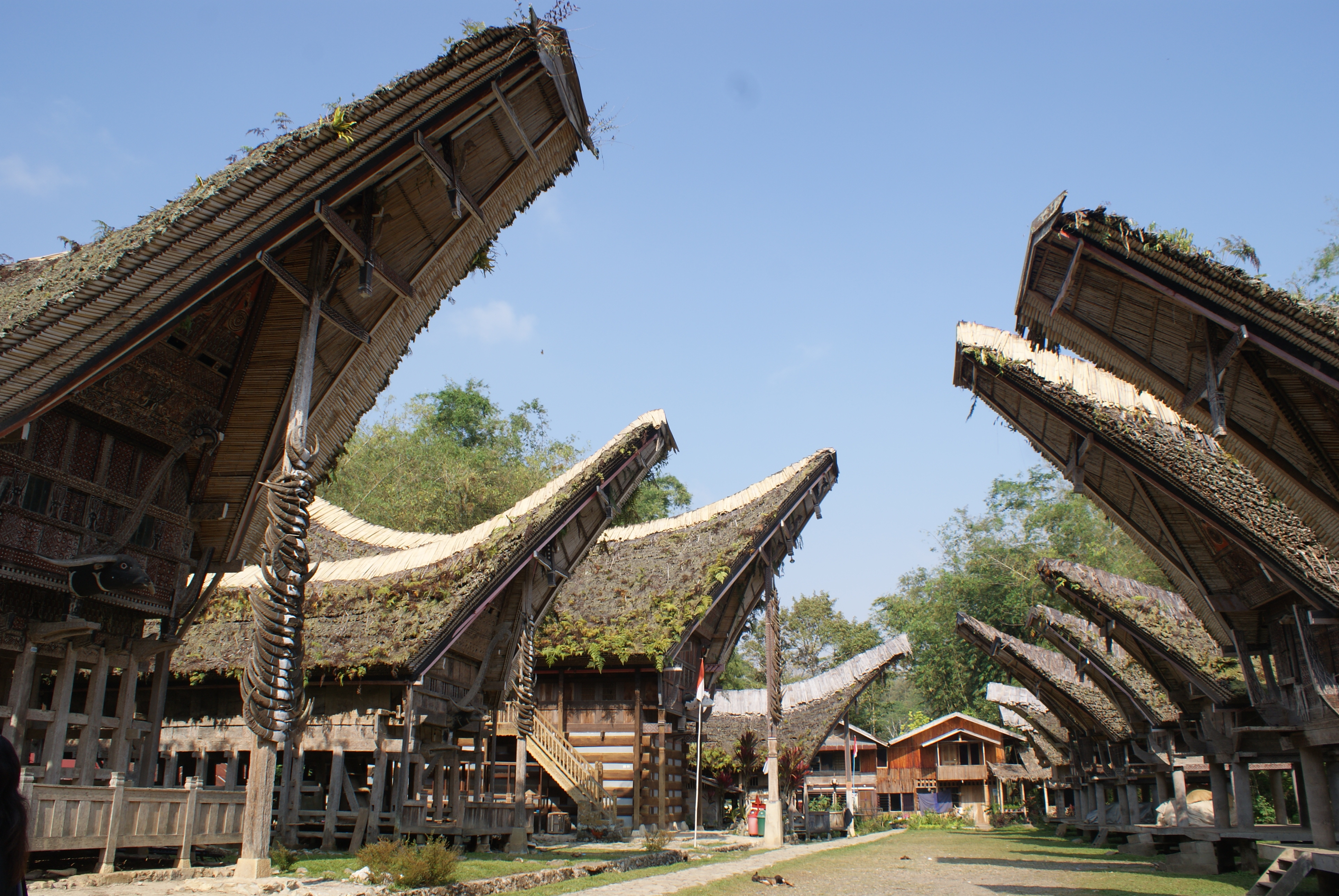
An avenue of houses in a Torajan village.

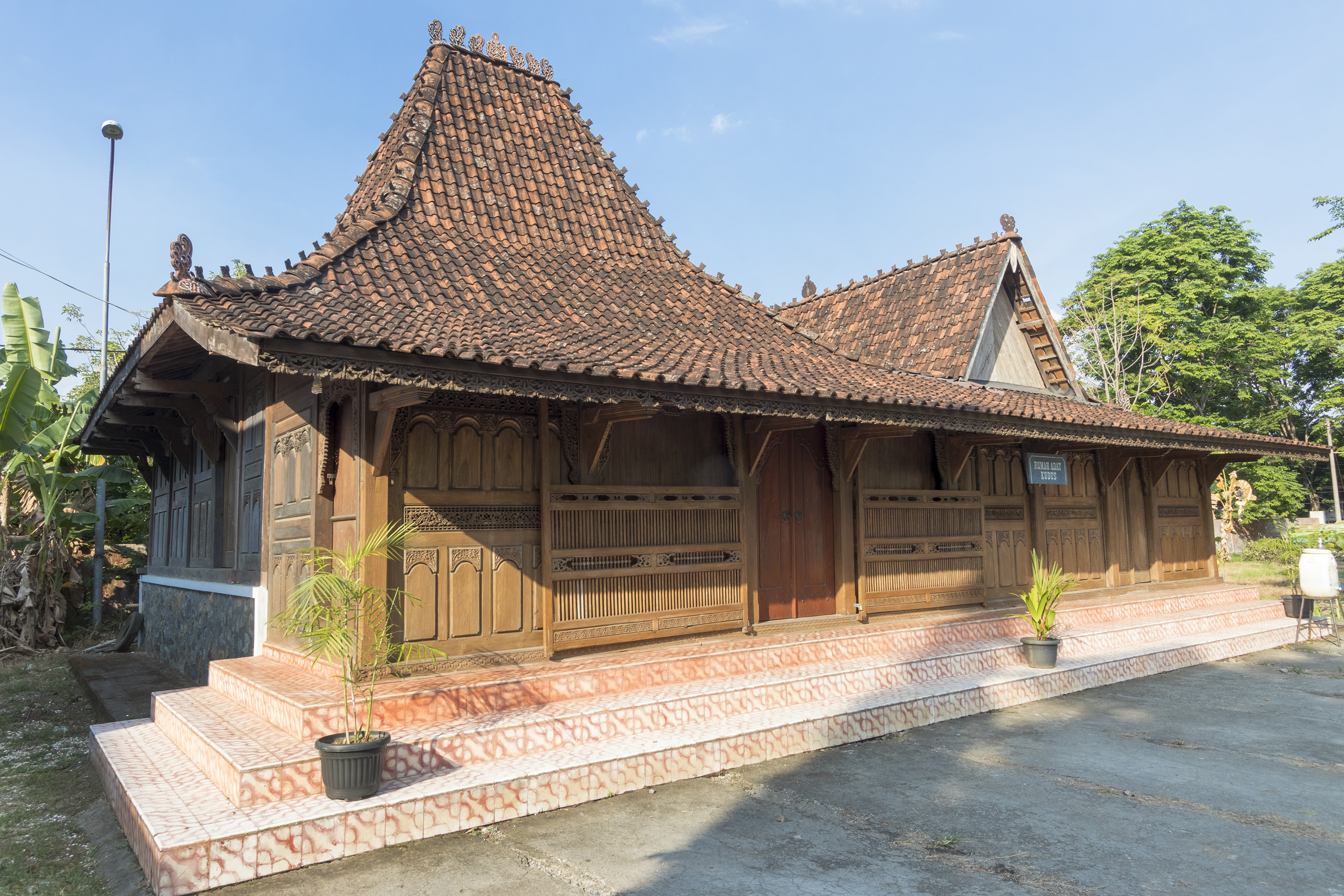
Joglo with limasan-type roof in Central Java

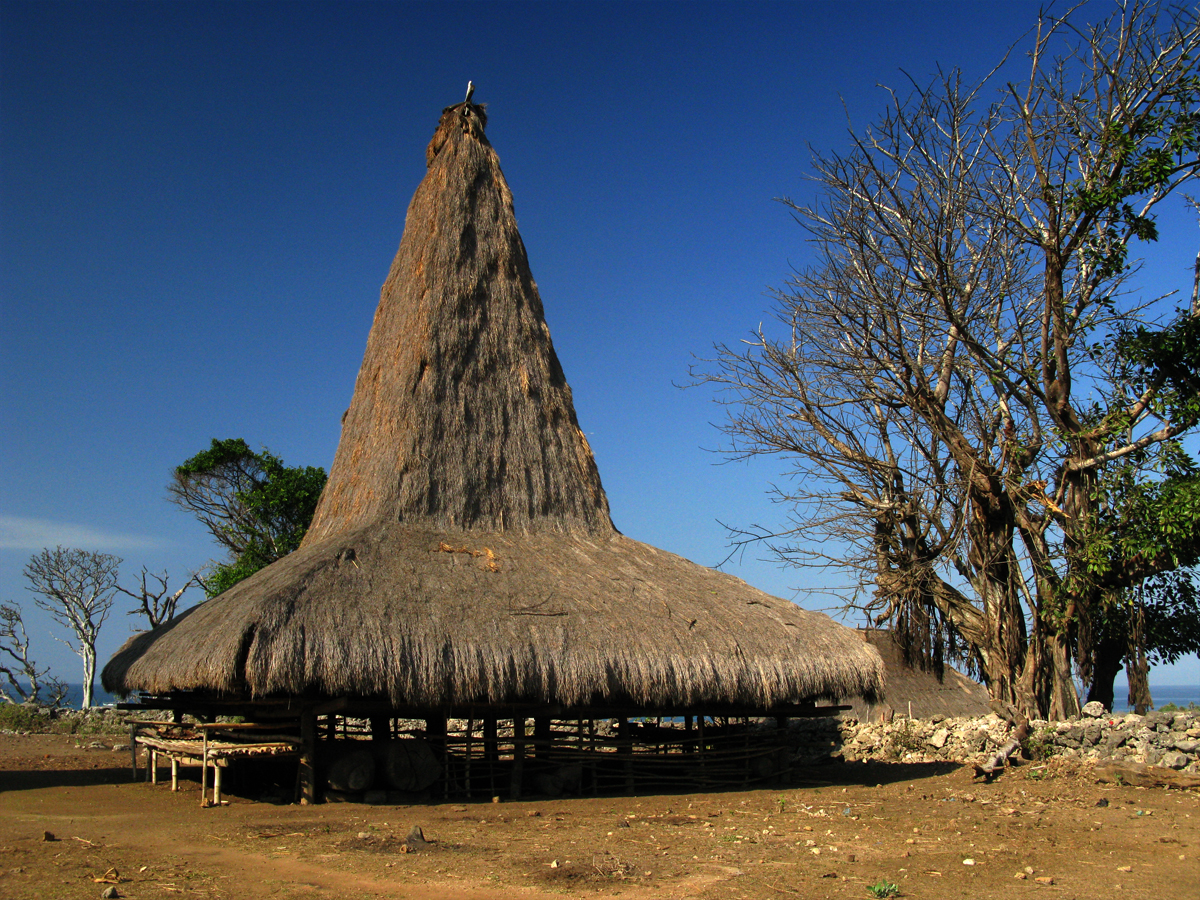
Uma Mbatangu, a traditional Sumba house in West Sumba, East Nusa Tenggara.

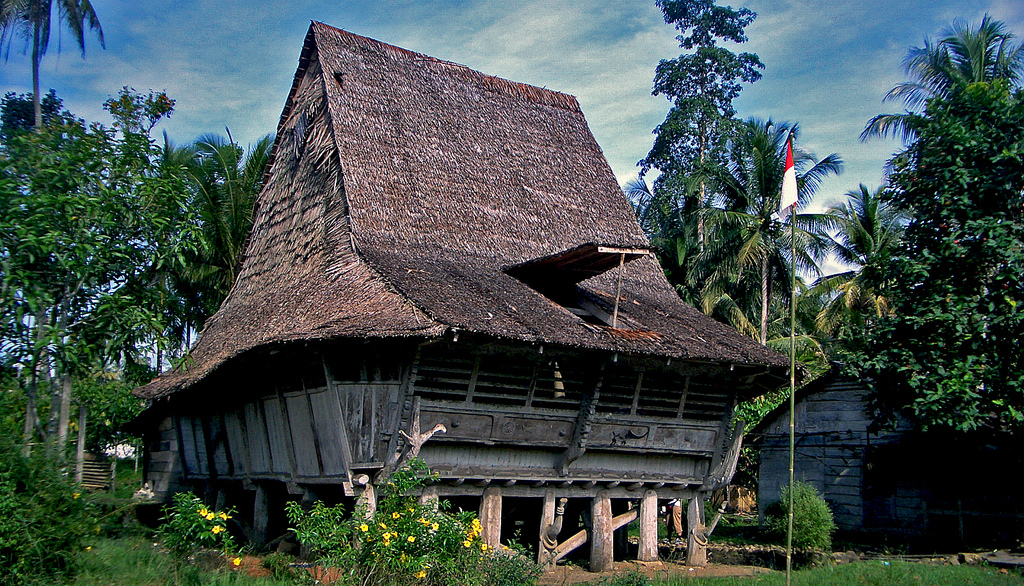
Traditional house in Nias, North Sumatra

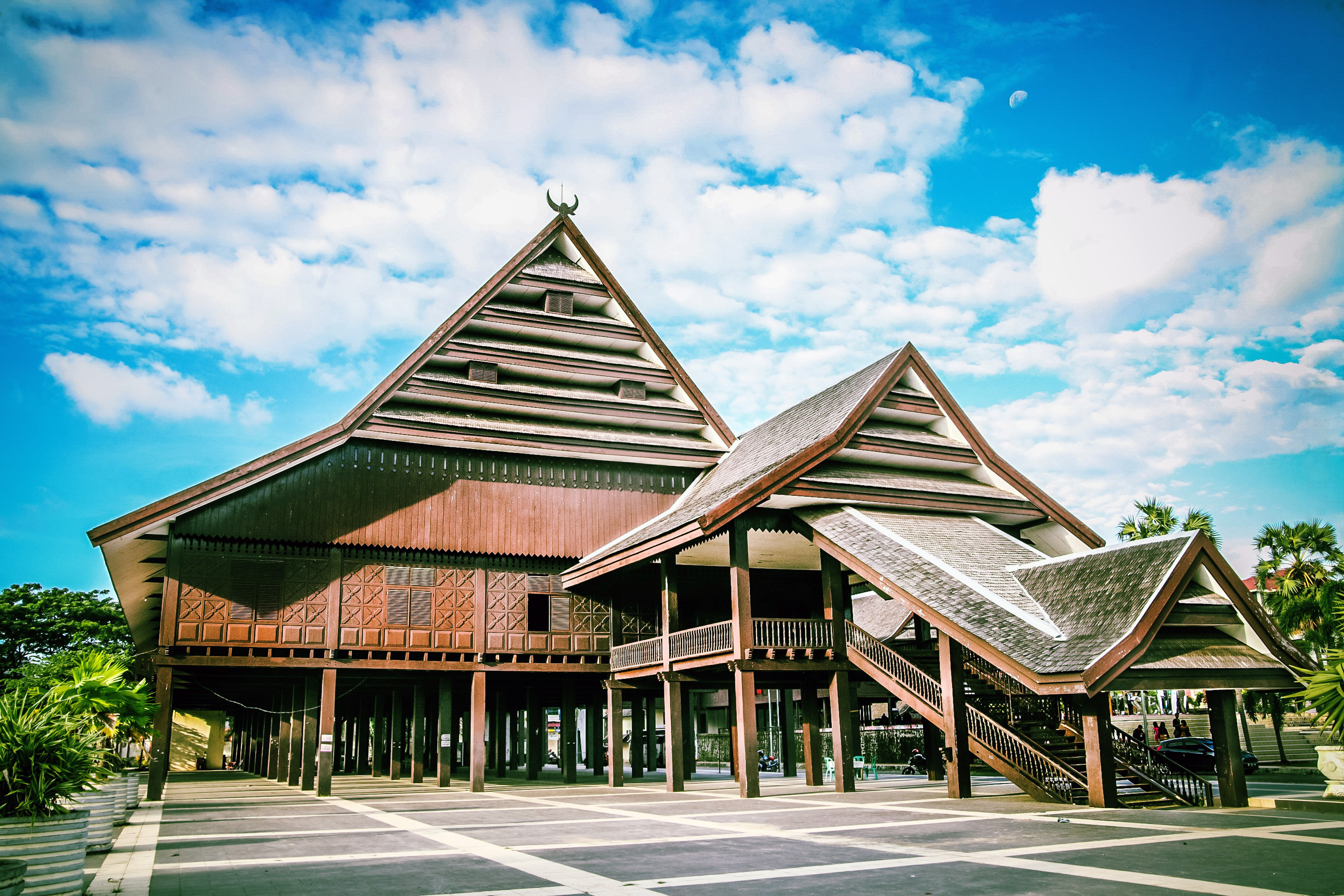
Bugis house, South Sulawesi

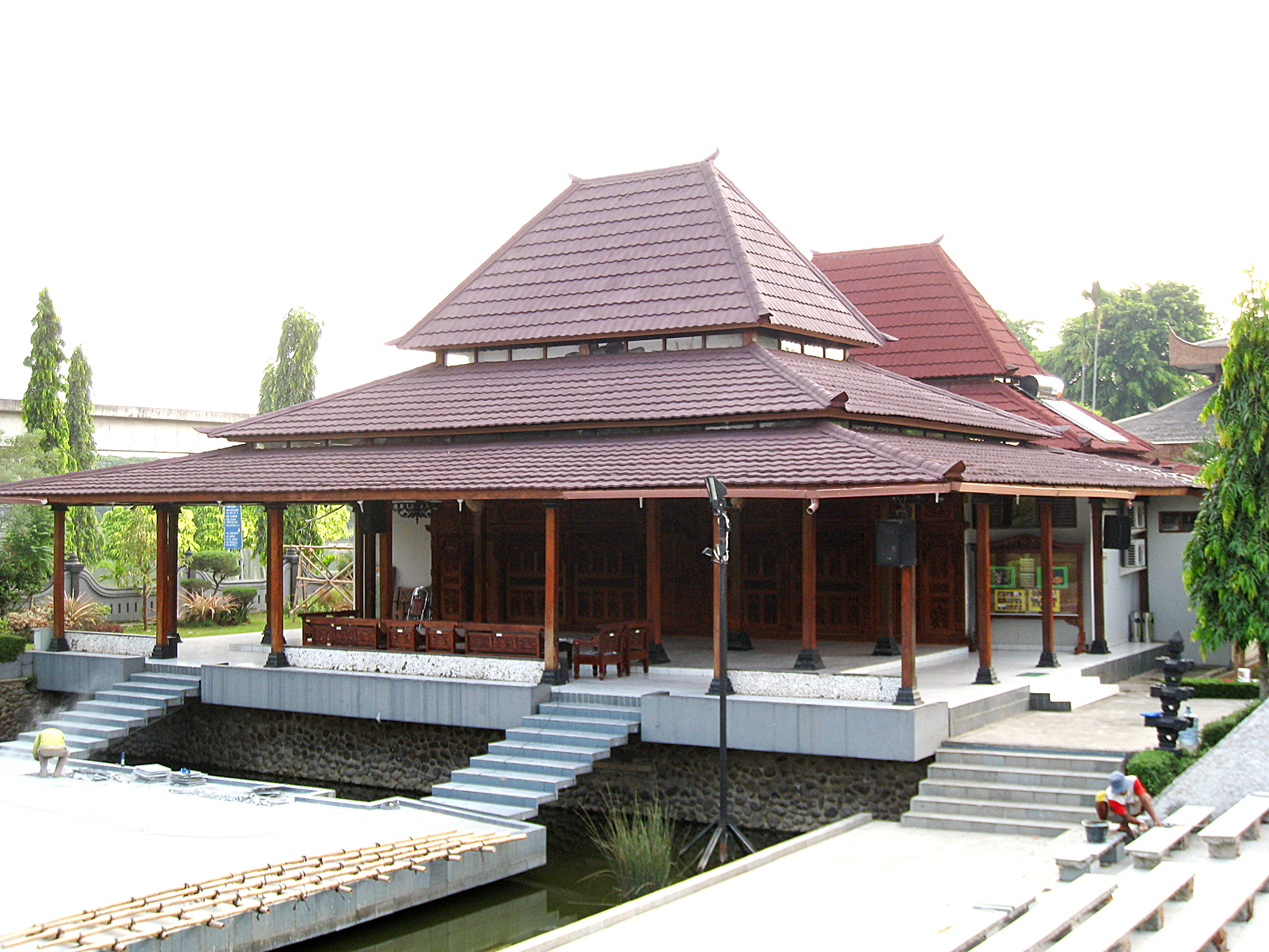
Pendopo with tajug-type roof in Taman Mini Indonesia Indah

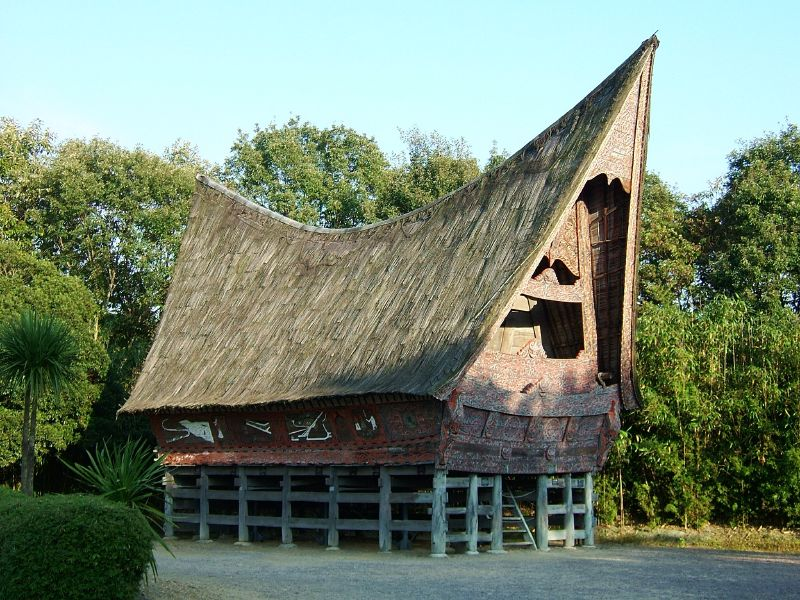
A traditional Batak Toba house in North Sumatra

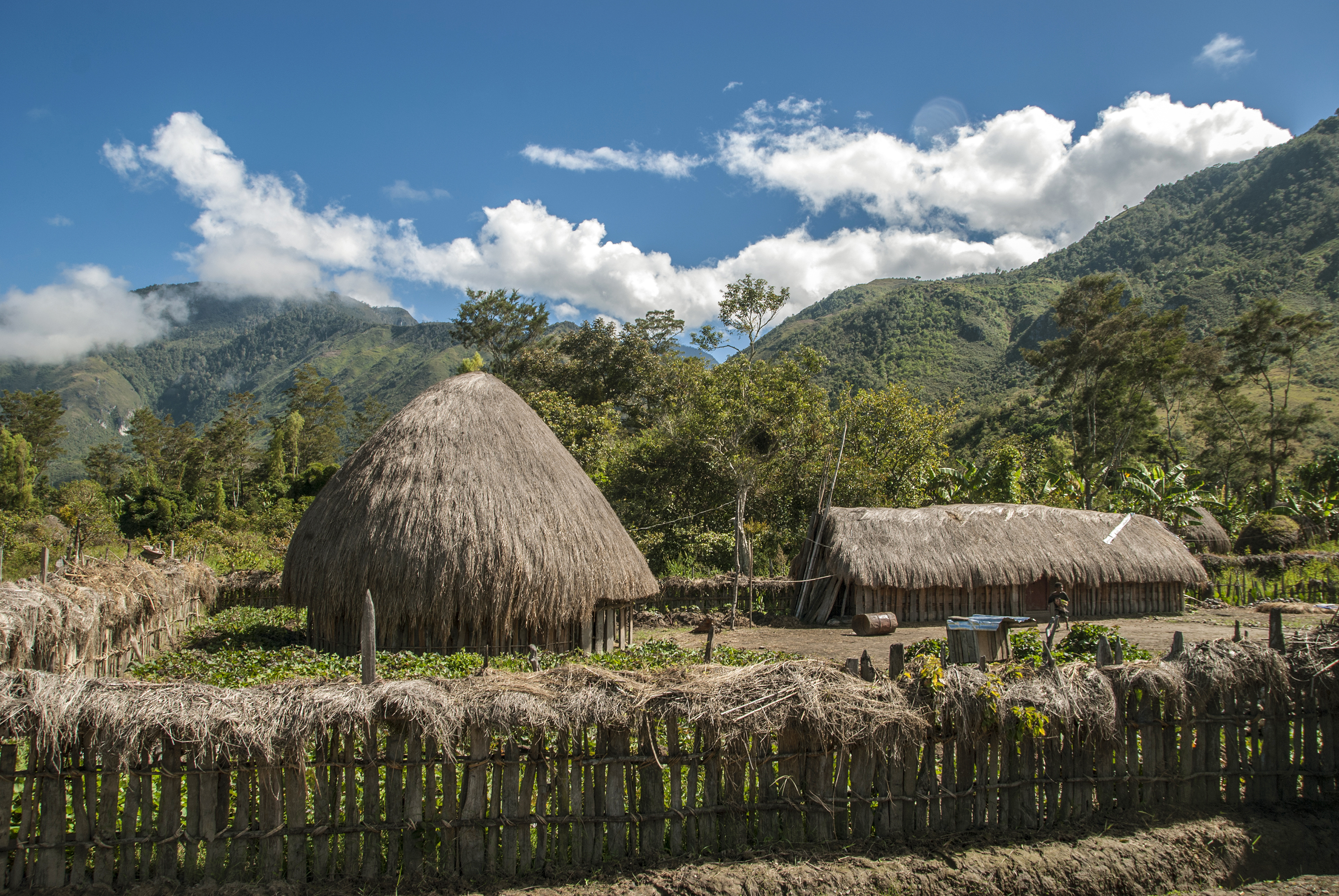
Honai, a traditional house from Papua

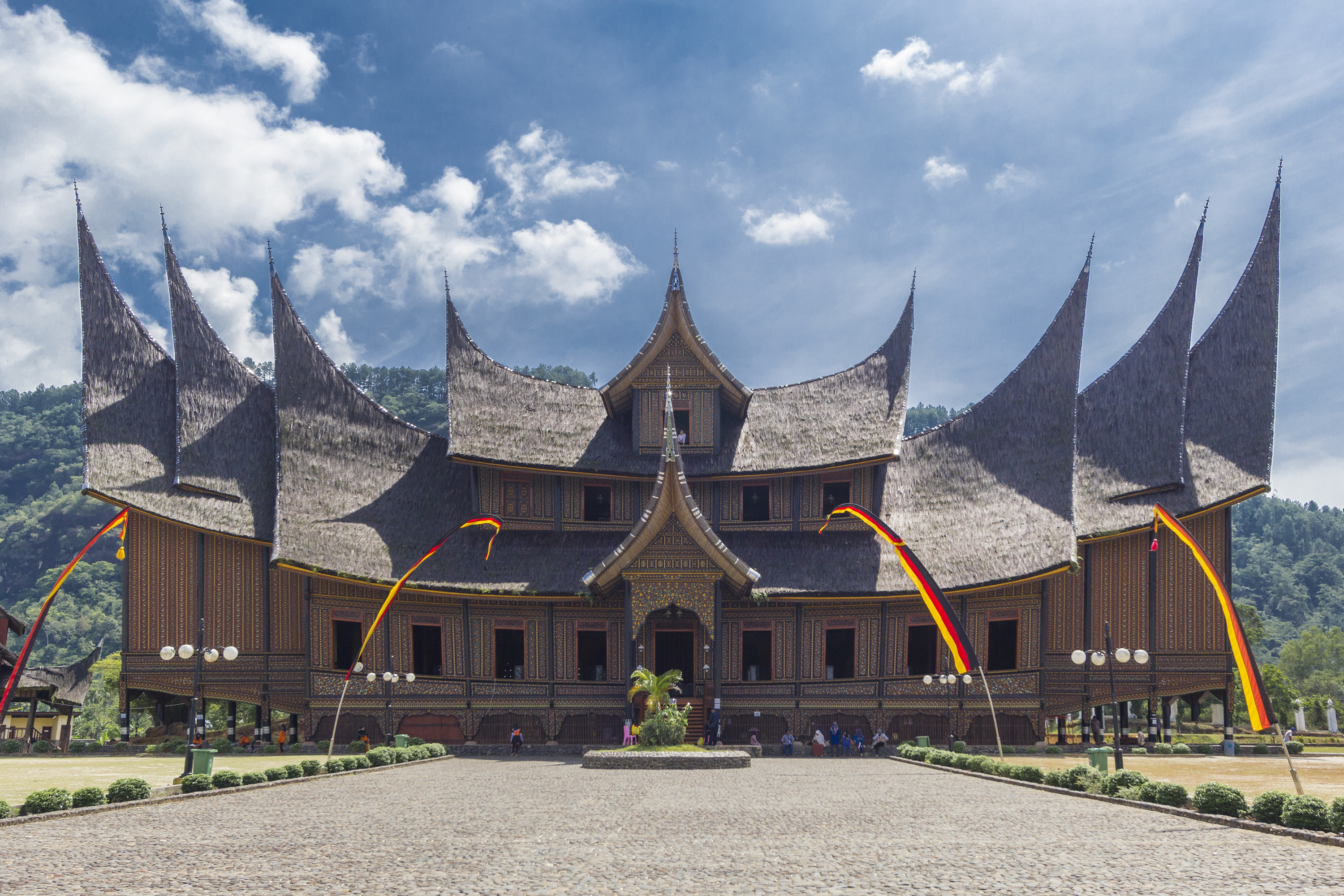
Pagaruyung Palace, a Minangkabau architecture from West Sumatra

Some of the more significant and distinctive rumah adat include:

- Rumoh Aceh, the grandest traditional houses of Aceh.
- Batak architecture (North Sumatra) includes the boat-shaped jabu homes of the Toba Batak people, with dominating carved gables and dramatic oversized roof, and are based on an ancient model.
- The Minangkabau of West Sumatra build the Rumah Gadang, distinctive for their multiple gables with dramatically upsweeping ridge ends.
- The homes of Nias peoples include the omo sebua chiefs' houses built on massive ironwood pillars with towering roofs. Not only are they almost impregnable to attack in former tribal warfare, but flexible nail-less construction provide proven earthquake durability.
- Rumah Melayu Malay traditional houses built on stilts of Sumatra, Borneo and Malay Peninsula.
- The Riau region is characterised by villages built on stilts over waterways.
- Unlike most South East Asian vernacular homes, Javanese traditional houses are not built on piles.
- The Bubungan Tinggi, with their steeply pitched roofs, are the large homes of Banjarese royalty and aristocrats in South Kalimantan.
- Traditional Balinese homes are a collection of individual, largely open structures (including separate structures for the kitchen, sleeping areas, bathing areas and shrine) within a high-walled garden compound.
- The Sasak people of Lombok build lumbung, pile-built bonnet-roofed rice barns, that are often more distinctive and elaborate than their houses (see Sasak architecture).
- Dayak people traditionally live in communal longhouses that are built on piles. The houses can exceed 300 m in length, in some cases forming a whole village.
- The Toraja of the Sulawesi highlands are renowned for their tongkonan, houses built on piles and dwarfed by massive exaggerated-pitch saddle roofs.
- Rumah adat on Sumba have distinctive thatched "high hat" roofs and are wrapped with sheltered verandahs.
- The Papuan Dani traditionally live in small family compounds composed of several circular huts known as honai with thatched dome roofs.

=== Decline ===
The numbers of rumah adat are decreasing across Indonesia. This trend dates from the colonial period, with the Dutch generally viewing traditional architecture as unhygienic, and being based on traditional religious practises seen as dubious by the Dutch. Colonial authorities embarked on demolition programmes, replacing traditional homes with houses built using Western construction techniques, such as bricks and corrugated iron roofs, fitting sanitary facilities and better ventilation. Traditional craftsmen were retrained in Western building techniques. Since independence, the Indonesian government has continued to promote the 'rumah sehat sederhana' ('simple healthy home') over the rumah adat.

Exposure to the market economy made the construction of labour-intensive rumah adat, such as the Batak house and Joglo, extremely expensive (previously villages would work together to construct new homes) to build and maintain. Hardwoods are no longer a free resource to be gathered as needed from nearby forests, but are now generally too-expensive. The great majority of Indonesians now dwell in generic modern buildings rather than traditional rumah adat.

== Hindu-Buddhist architecture ==
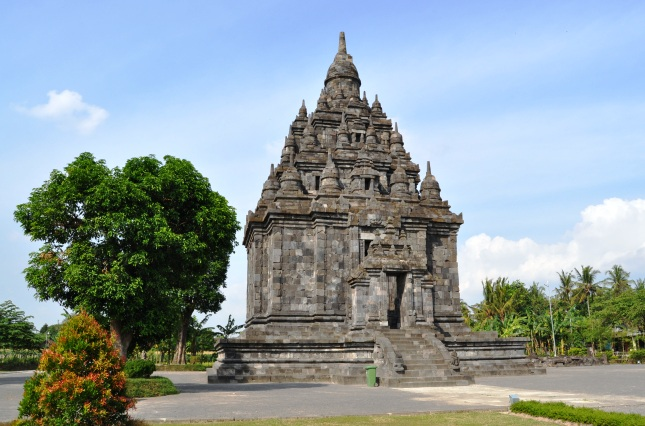
Sojiwan temple, an example of typical 9th-century Javanese temple architecture.

A number of often large and sophisticated religious structures (known as candi in Indonesian) were built in Java during the peak of Indonesia's great Hindu-Buddhist kingdoms between the 8th and 14th centuries (see Ancient temples of Java). The earliest surviving Hindu temples in Java are at the Dieng Plateau. Thought to have originally numbered as many as 400, only 8 remain today. The Dieng structures were small and relatively plain, but architecture developed substantially and just 100 years later the second Kingdom of Mataram built the Prambanan complex near Yogyakarta; considered the largest and finest example of Hindu architecture in Java. The World Heritage-listed Buddhist monument Borobudur was built by the Sailendra Dynasty between 750 and 850 CE, but it was abandoned shortly after its completion as a result of the decline of Buddhism and a shift of power to eastern Java. The monument contains a vast number of intricate carvings that tell a story as one moves through to the upper levels, metaphorically reaching enlightenment. With the decline of the Mataram kingdom before 929 CE, eastern Java became the focus of religious architecture with an exuberant style reflecting Shaivist, Buddhist and Javanese influences; a fusion that was characteristic of religion throughout Java. Archaeologists usually differentiate between the more monumental Central Javanese style and the smaller and more spread-out East Javanese candi, although Candi Badut, in the east Javanese city of Malang, is an example of a Central Javanese-style temple built outside that area.

Although brick was used to some extent during Indonesia's classical era, it was the Majapahit builders who mastered it, using a mortar of vine sap and palm sugar. The temples of Majapahit have a strong geometrical quality with a sense of verticality achieved through the use of numerous horizontal lines often with an almost art-deco sense of streamlining and proportion. Majapahit influencess can be seen today in the enormous number of Hindu temples of varying sizes spread throughout Bali. Several significant temples can be found in every village, and shrines, even small temples found in most family homes. Although they have elements in common with global Hindu styles, they are of a style largely unique to Bali and owe much to the Majapahit era.

Balinese architecture contains many elements of ancient Hindu-Buddhist architecture, mostly are the heritage from Majapahit architectural influences. Among others are the bale pavilion, Meru tower, paduraksa and candi bentar gates. Hindu-Buddhist architecture mostly were constructed between 8th to 15th-century, with subsequent tradition in Balinese architecture. However, typical ancient Javanese Hindu-Buddhist architecture has been the source of inspiration and recreated in contemporary architecture. For example, Ganjuran Church in Bantul, Yogyakarta contains a candi-like Hindu-style shrine dedicated to Jesus.

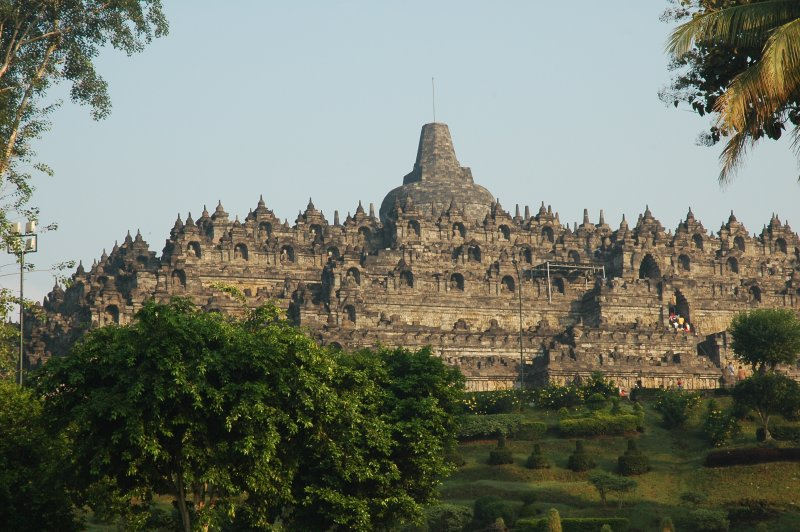
The Buddhist Borobudur temple, an elaborate stupa arranged in a grand mandala

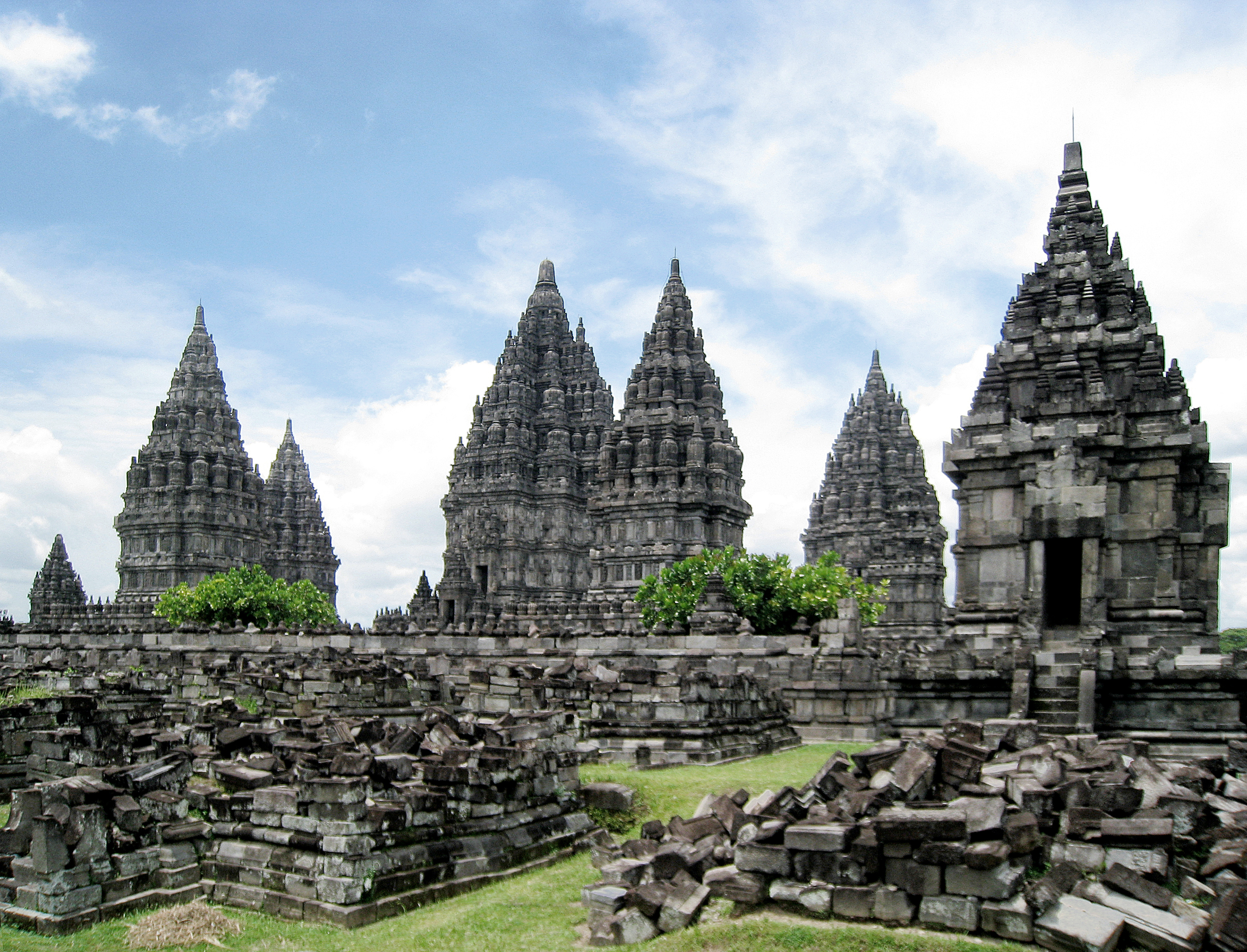
The Prambanan temple complex dedicated to Trimurti Hindu godstemple

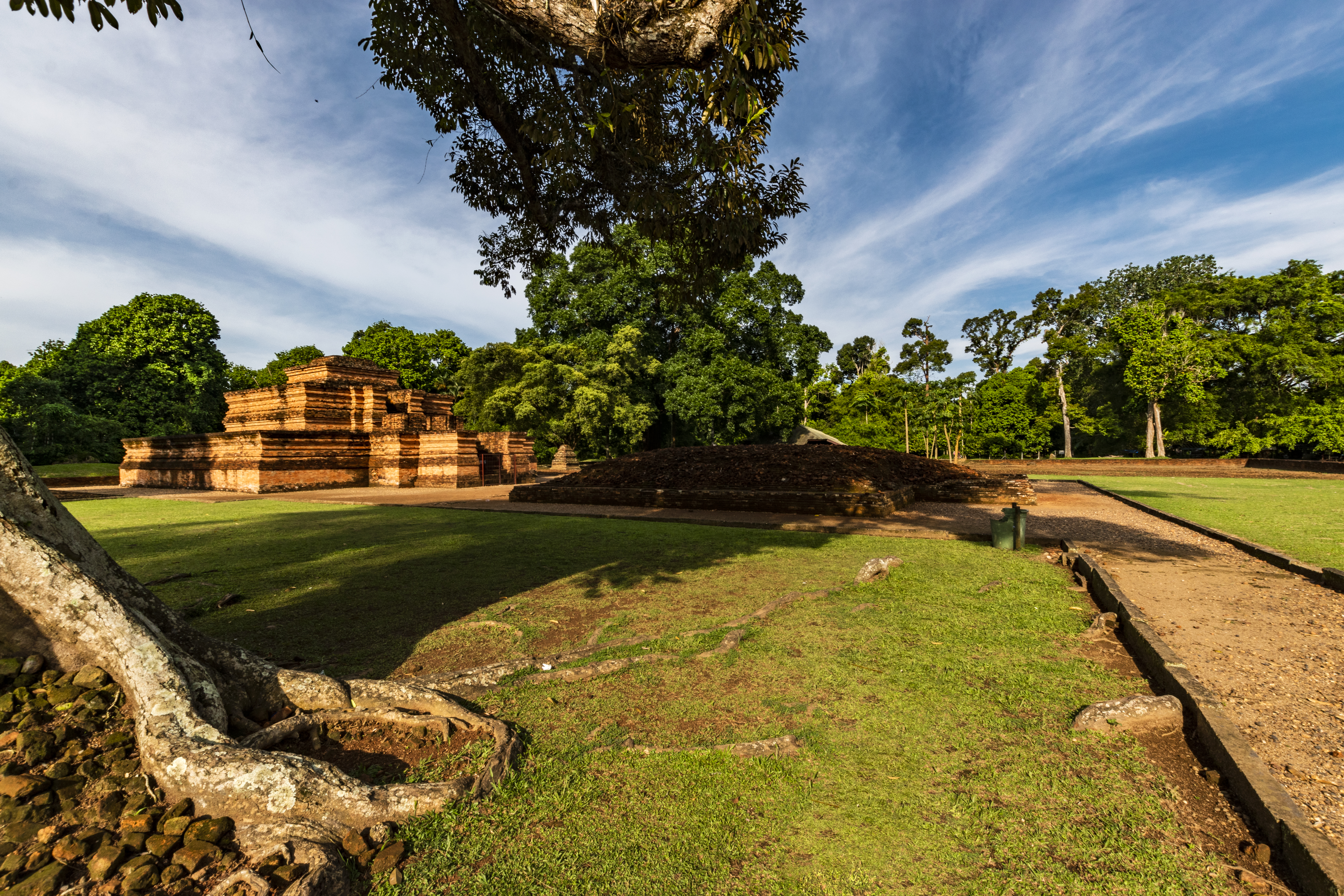
Muaro Jambi Temple Compounds.

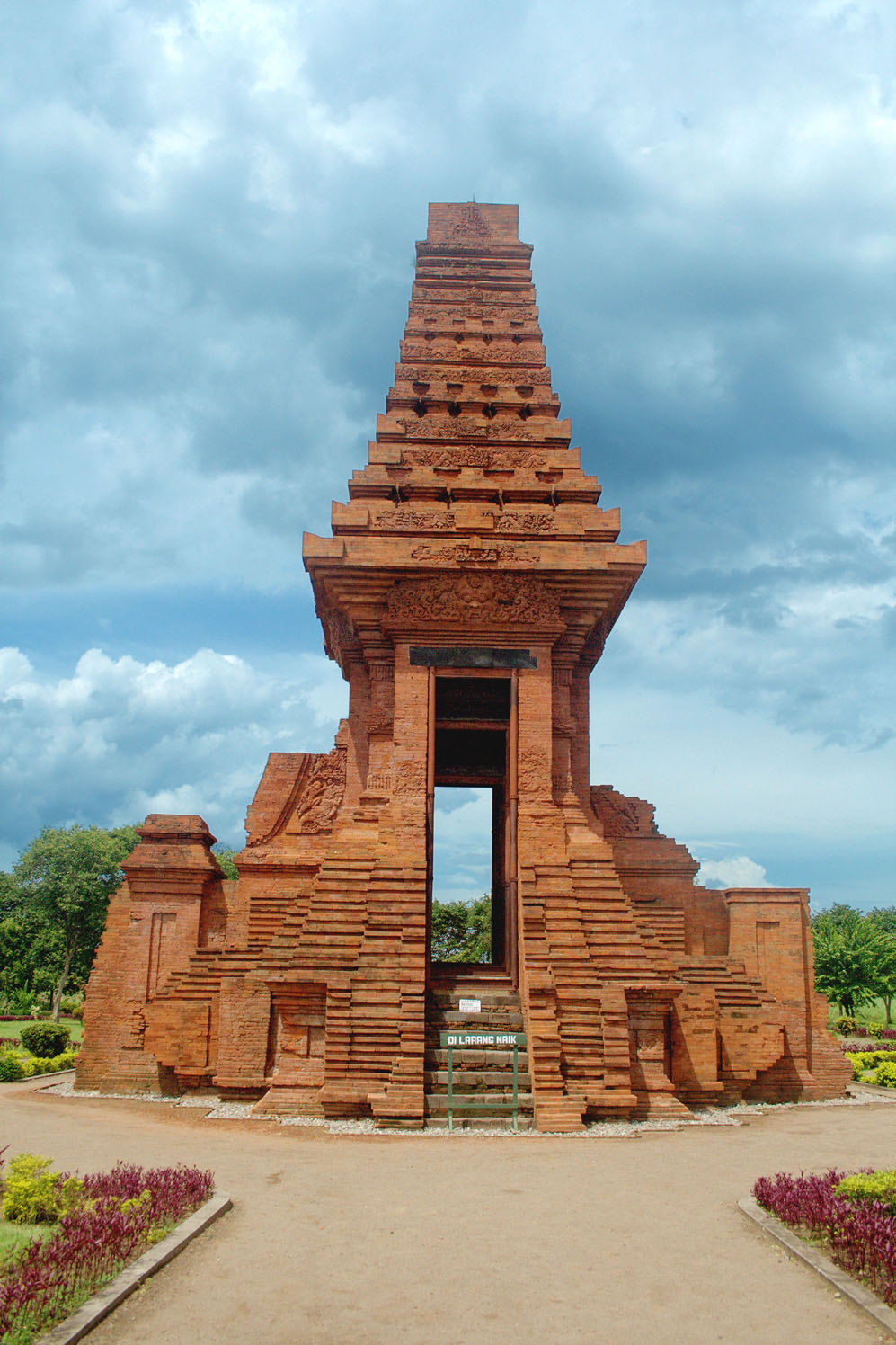
A paduraksa gate from Trowulan, an architectural feature marking the threshold into an inner compound

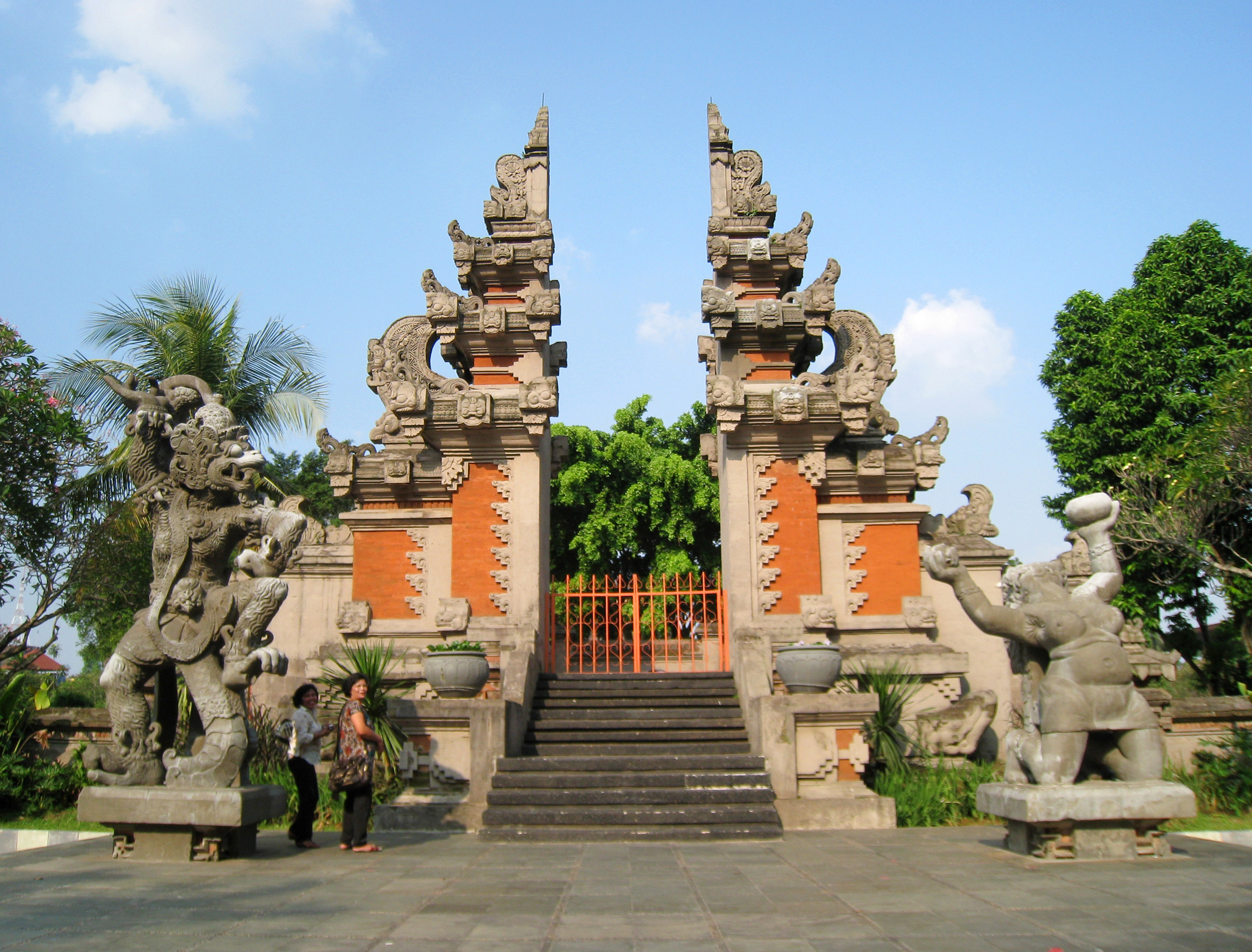
Candi bentar split gate marking entrance into a compound

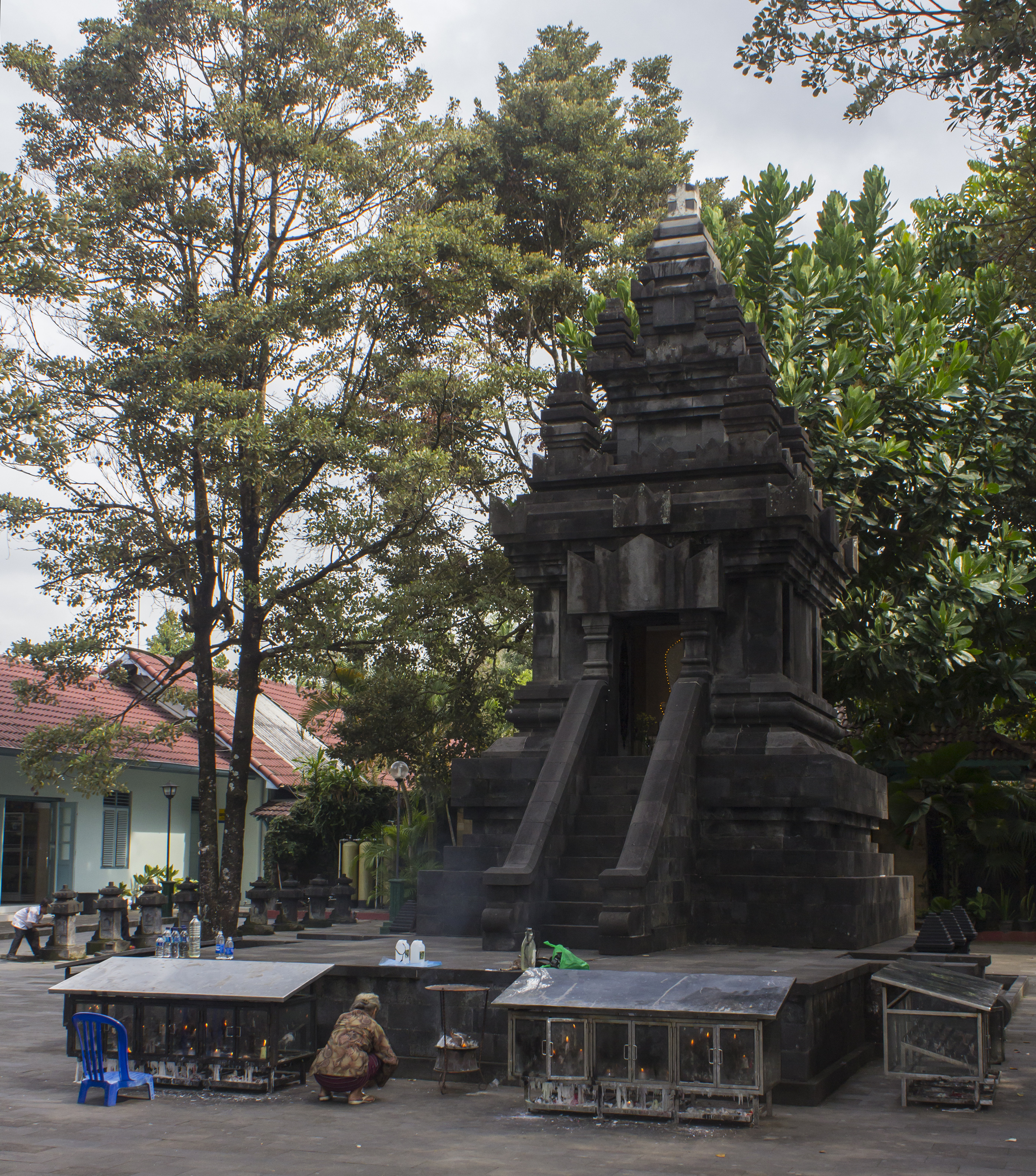
A shrine dedicated to Jesus in Ganjuran Church recreated Javanese Hindu-style temple

== Islamic architecture ==
Although religious architecture has been widespread in Indonesia, the most significant was developed in Java. The island's long tradition of religious syncretism extended to architecture, which fostered uniquely Javanese styles of Hindu, Buddhist, Islamic, and to a lesser extent, Christian architecture.

=== Vernacular mosque architecture ===
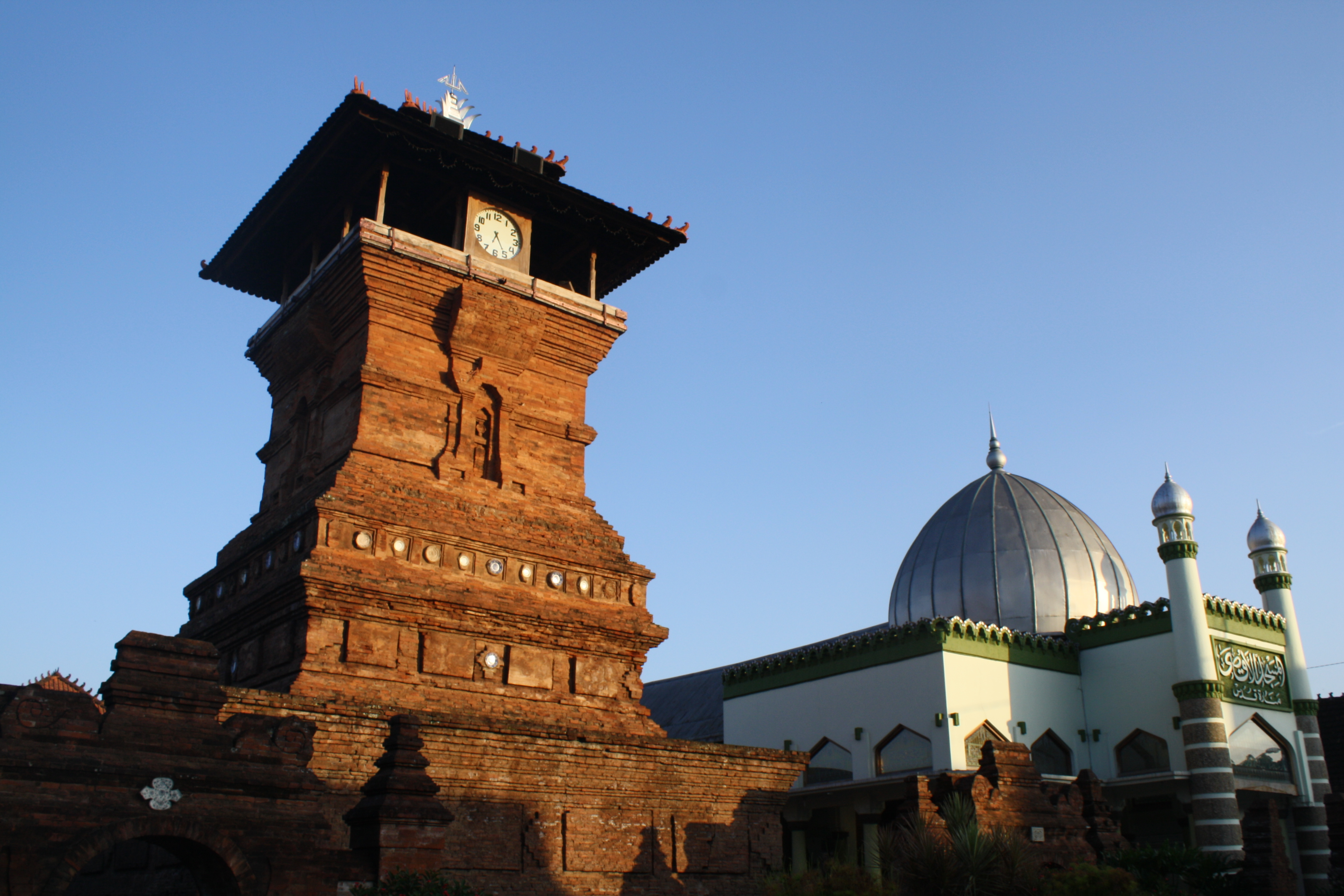
The Majapahit style minaret of Kudus Mosque shows transition from Hindu-Buddhist period to Islamic period.

By the fifteenth century, Islam had become the dominant religion in Java and Sumatra, Indonesia's two most populous islands. As with Hinduism and Buddhism before it, the new religion, and the foreign influences that accompanied it, were absorbed and reinterpreted, with mosques given a unique Indonesian/Javanese interpretation. At the time, Javanese mosques took many design cues from Hindu, Buddhist, and even Chinese architectural influences (see image of "Grand Mosque" in Yogyakarta). They lacked, for example, the ubiquitous Islamic dome which did not appear in Indonesia until the 19th century, but had tall timber, multi-level roofs similar to the pagodas of Balinese Hindu temples still common today. A number of significant early mosques survive, particularly along the north coast of Java. These include the Mesjid Agung in Demak, built in 1474, and the Menara Kudus Mosque in Kudus (1549) whose minaret is thought to be the watch tower of an earlier Hindu temple. Javanese mosque styles in turn influenced the architectural styles of mosques among its neighbours, among other the mosques in Kalimantan, Sumatra, Maluku, and also neighbouring Malaysia, Brunei and the southern Philippines. Sultan Suriansyah Mosque in Banjarmasin and Kampung Hulu Mosque in Malacca for example displaying Javanese influence.

In Sumatra, the old mosques in Minangkabau lands of West Sumatra demonstrate local tradition of vernacular Minangkabau architecture. The example includes the old mosque of Bingkudu in Agam Regency, and also Masjid Lubuk Bauk in Batipuh, West Sumatra.

In the 19th century, the sultanates of Indonesian archipelago began to adopt and absorb foreign influences of Islamic architecture, as alternative to Javanese style already popular in the archipelago. The Indo-Islamic and Moorish style are particularly favored by Aceh Sultanate and Deli Sultanate, as displayed in Banda Aceh Baiturrahman Grand Mosque built in 1881, and Medan Grand Mosque built in 1906. Particularly during the decades since Indonesian independence, mosques have tended to be built in styles more consistent with global Islamic styles, which mirrors the trend in Indonesia towards more orthodox practice of Islam.

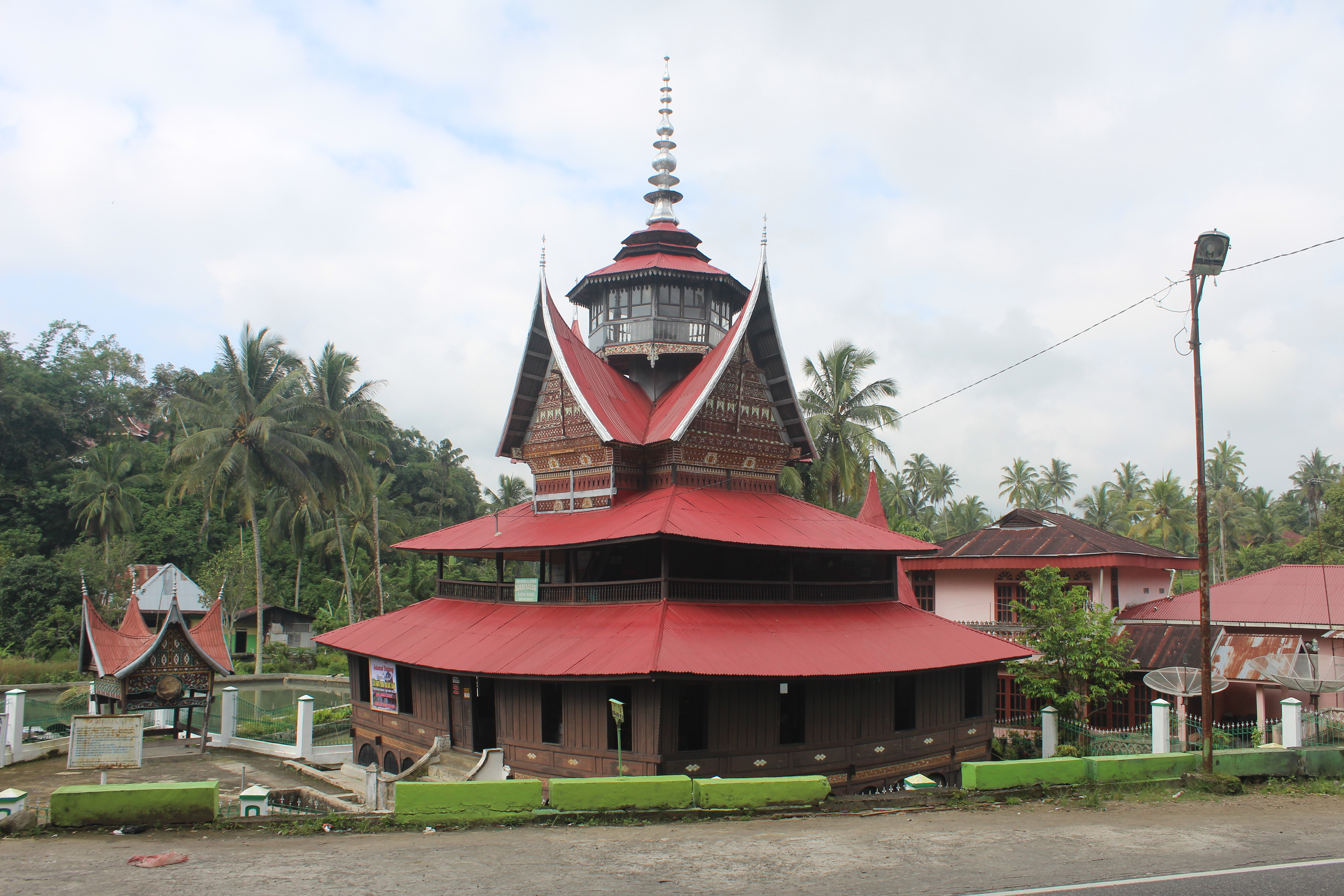
Late 19th-century village mosque (surau nagari) of Lubuk Bauk in Batipuh, West Sumatra.

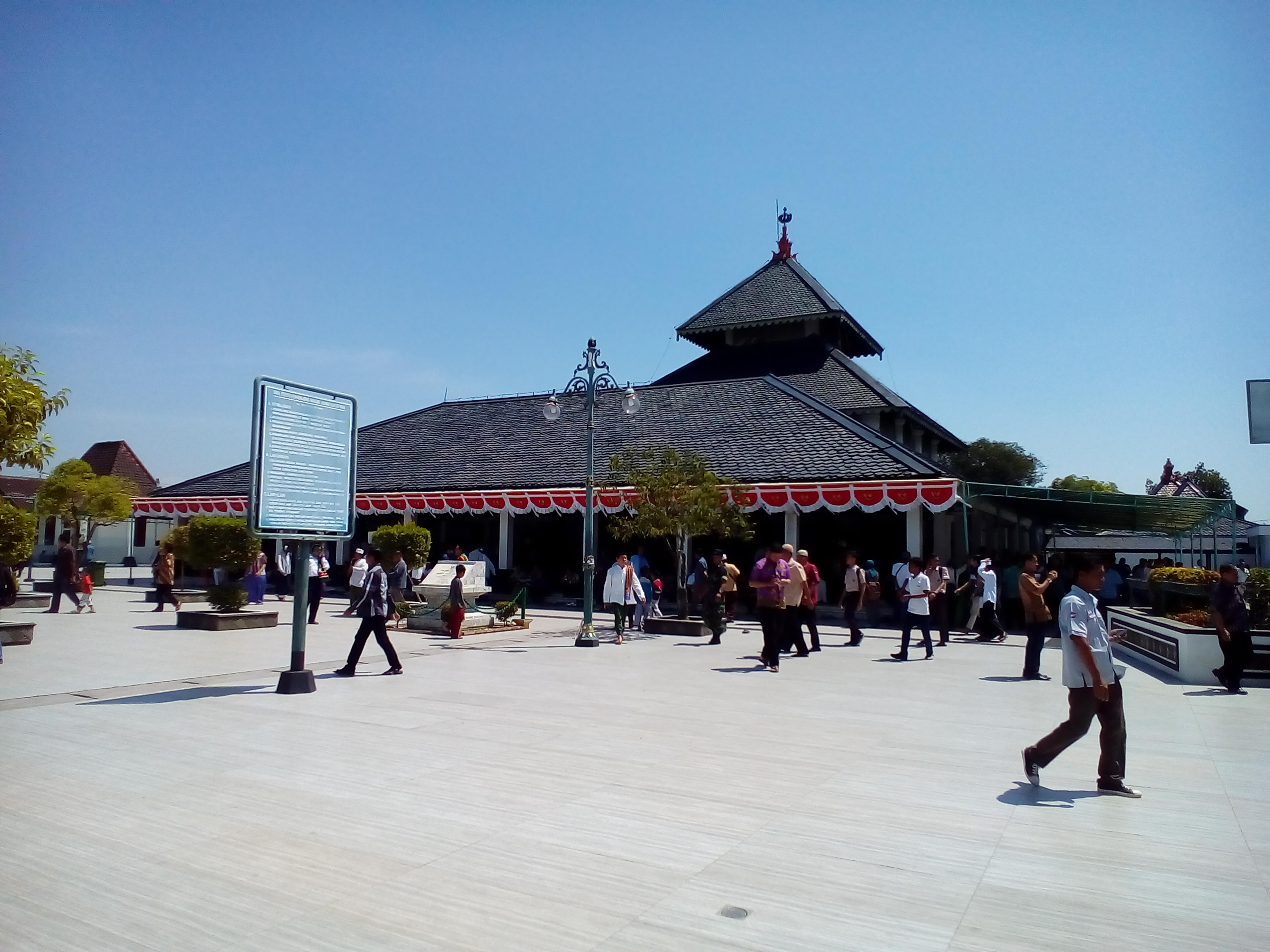
Demak Great Mosque, typical Javanese vernacular mosque architecture with multi-tiered roof

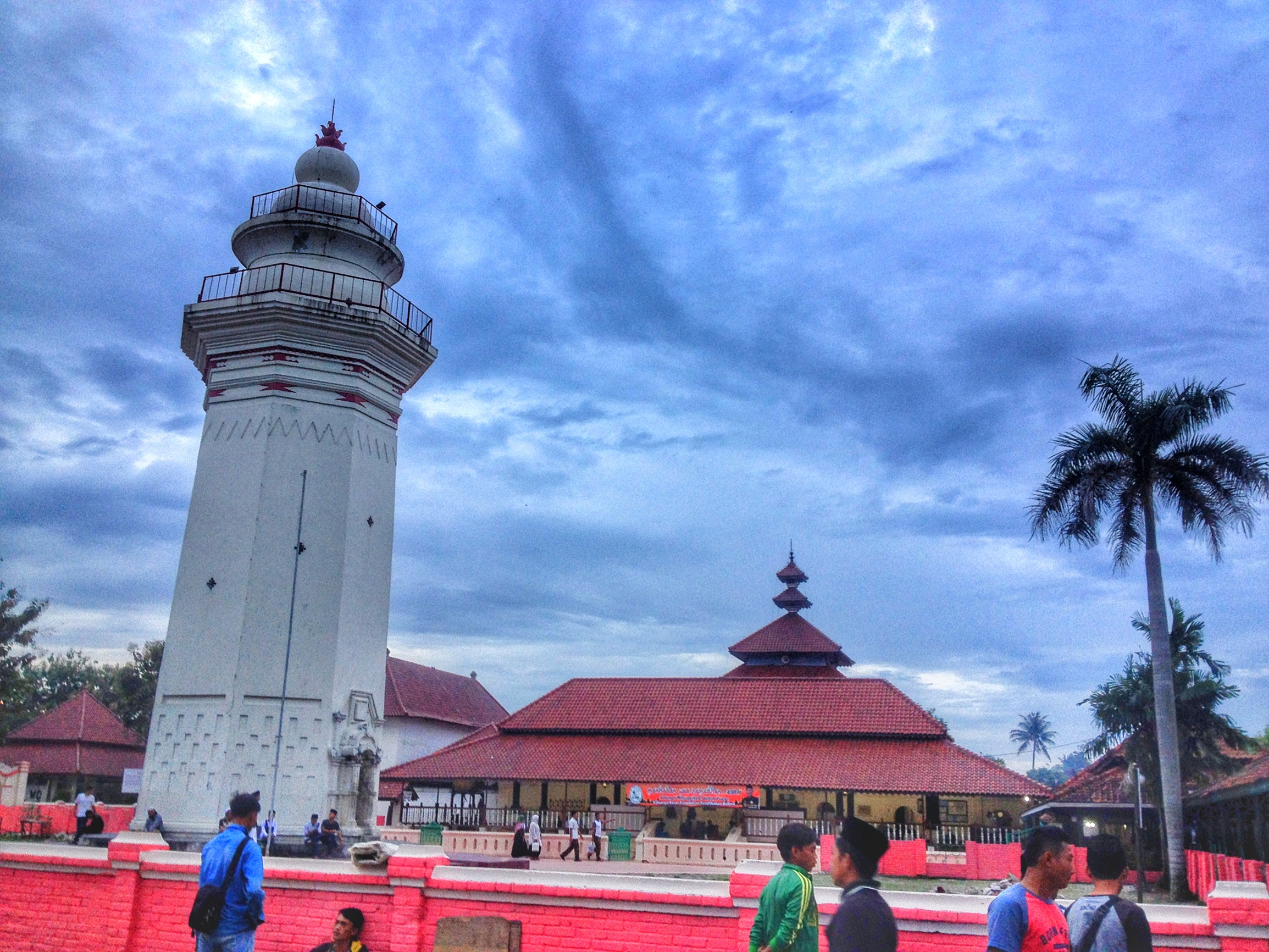
The 16th-century Great Mosque of Banten with a minaret that resembles a lighthouse.

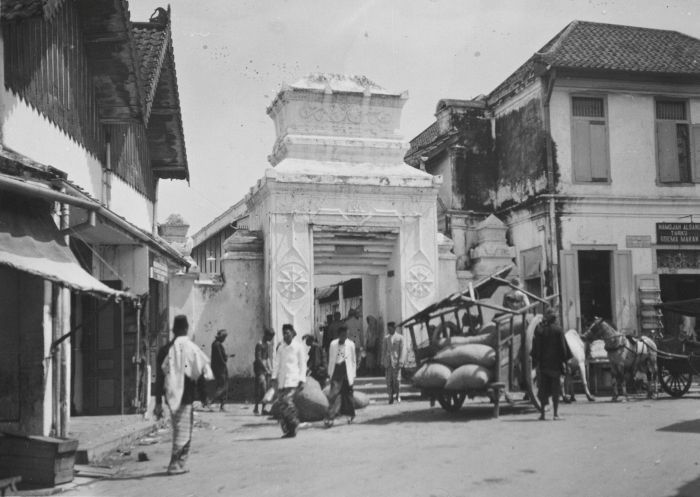
A paduraksa-like structure marking the entrance to the mosque compound.

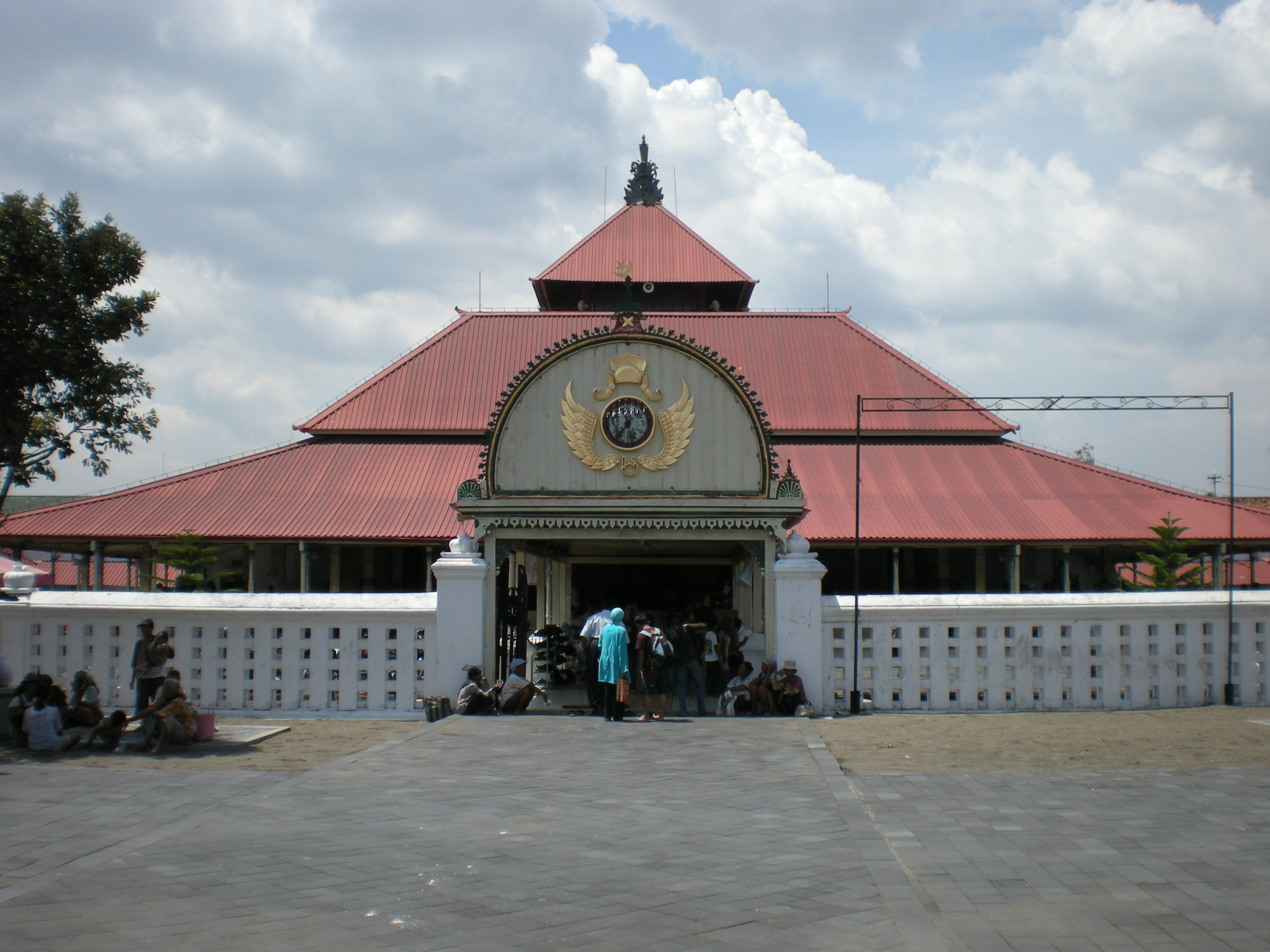
Kauman Great Mosque, the royal mosque of Yogyakarta.

=== Palace architecture ===
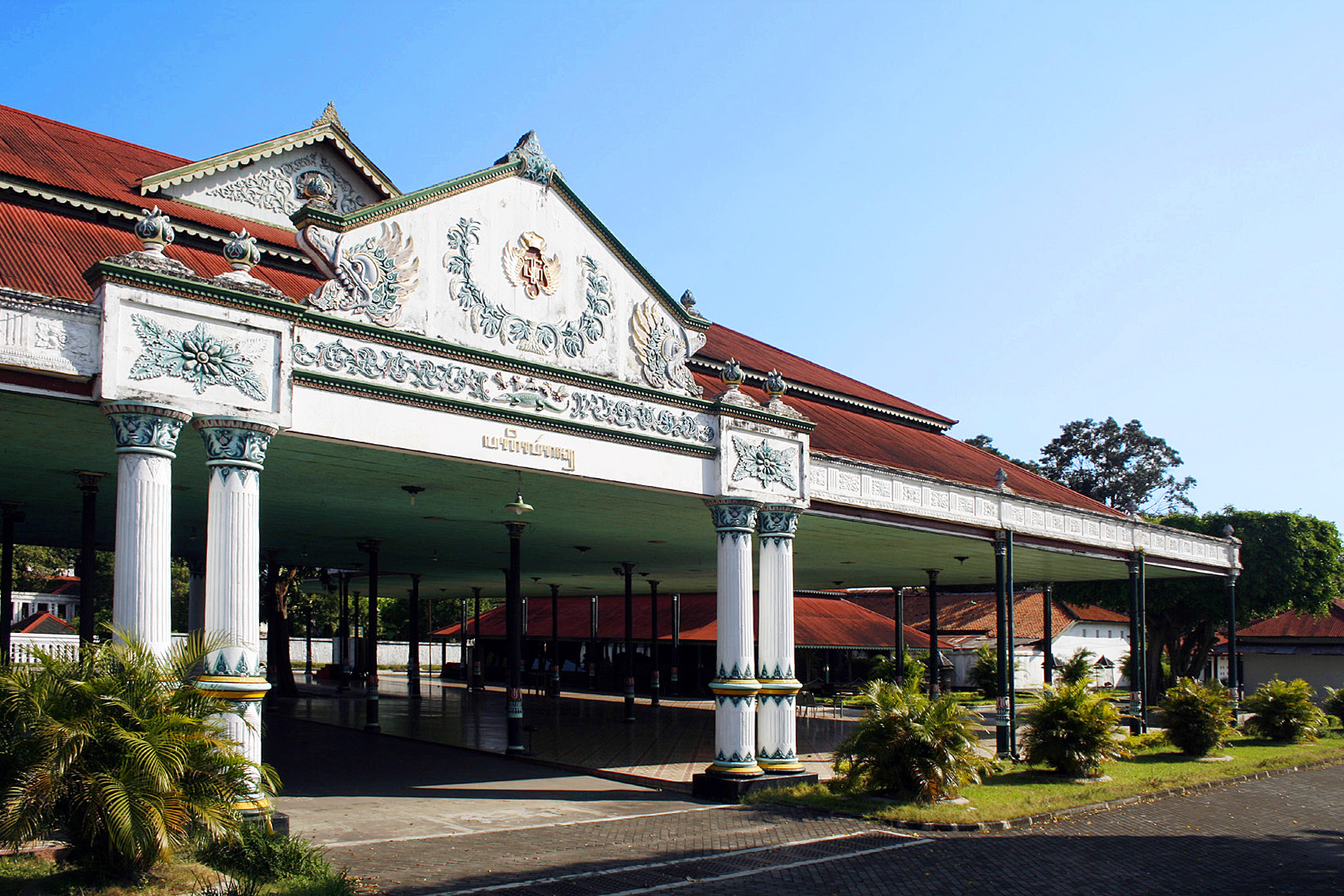
Pagelaran hall of Yogyakarta kraton, directly facing northern alun-alun

Istana (or "palace") architecture of the various kingdoms and realms of Indonesia, is more often than not based on the vernacular adat domestic styles of the area. Royal courts, however, were able to develop much grander and elaborate versions of this traditional architecture. In the Javanese Kraton, for example, large pendopos of the joglo roof form with tumpang sari ornamentation are elaborate but based on common Javanese forms, while the omo sebua ("chief's house") in Bawomataluo, Nias is an enlarged version of the homes in the village, the palaces of the Balinese such as the Puri Agung in Gianyar use the traditional bale form, and the Pagaruyung Palace is a three-storey version of the Minangkabau Rumah Gadang.

Similar to trends in domestic architecture, the last two centuries have seen the use of European elements in combination with traditional elements, albeit at a far more sophisticated and opulent level compared to domestic homes.

In the Javanese palaces the pendopo is the tallest and largest hall within a complex. As the place where the ruler sits, it is the focus of ceremonial occasions, and usually has prohibitions on access to this space.

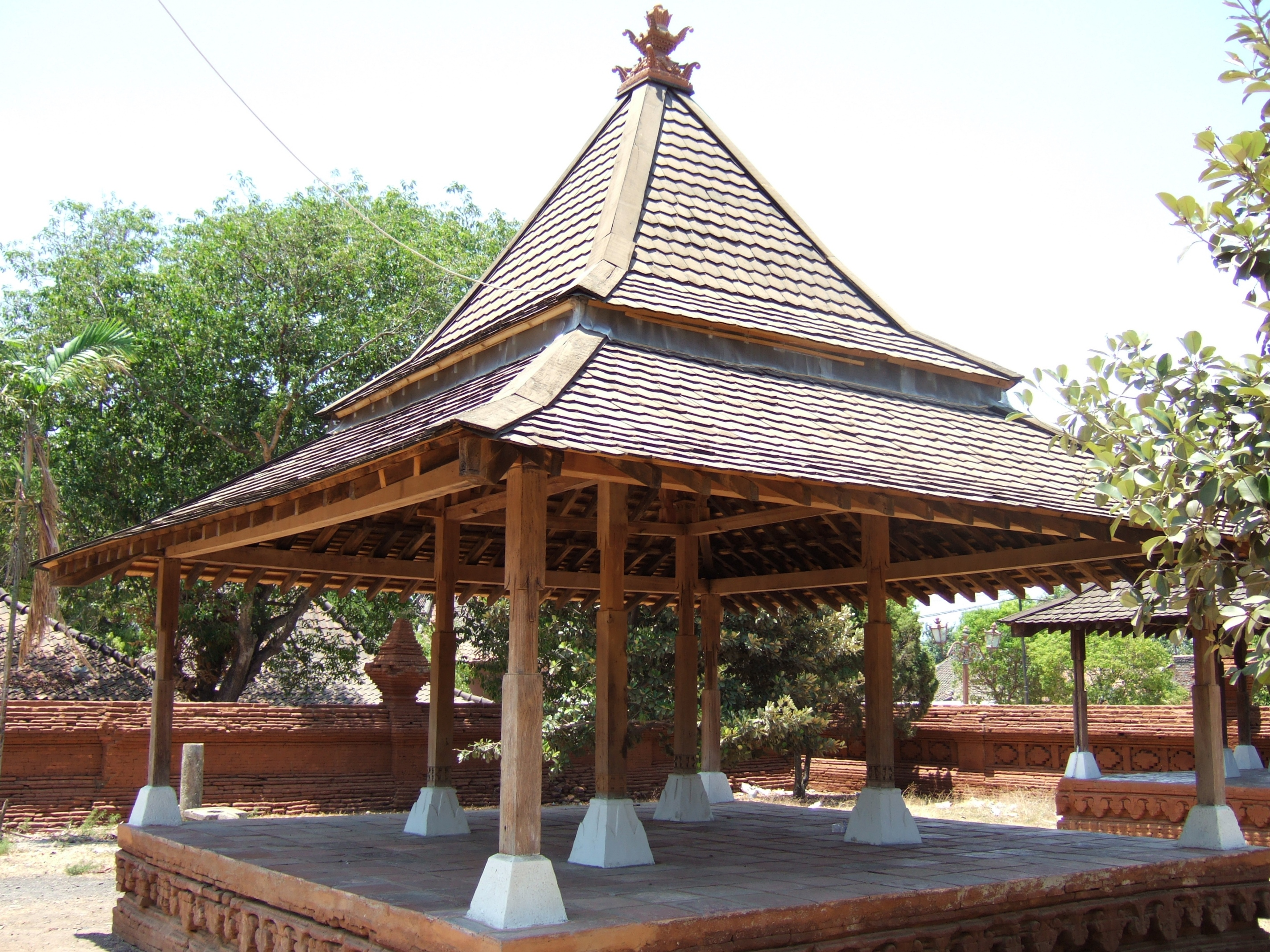
Pendhapa (pavilion) in Keraton Kasepuhan.

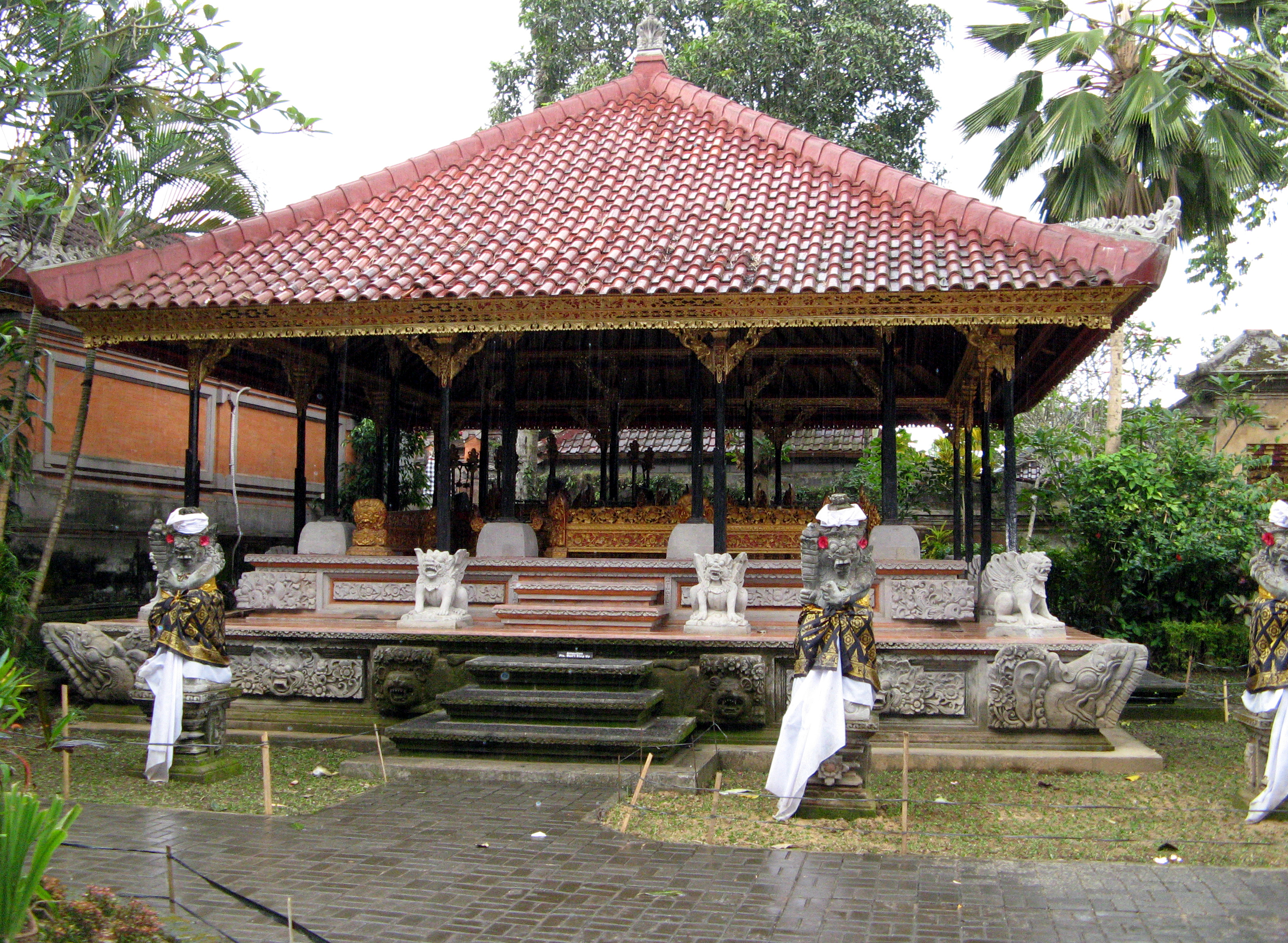
Bale gamelan pavilion within Puri Ubud compound

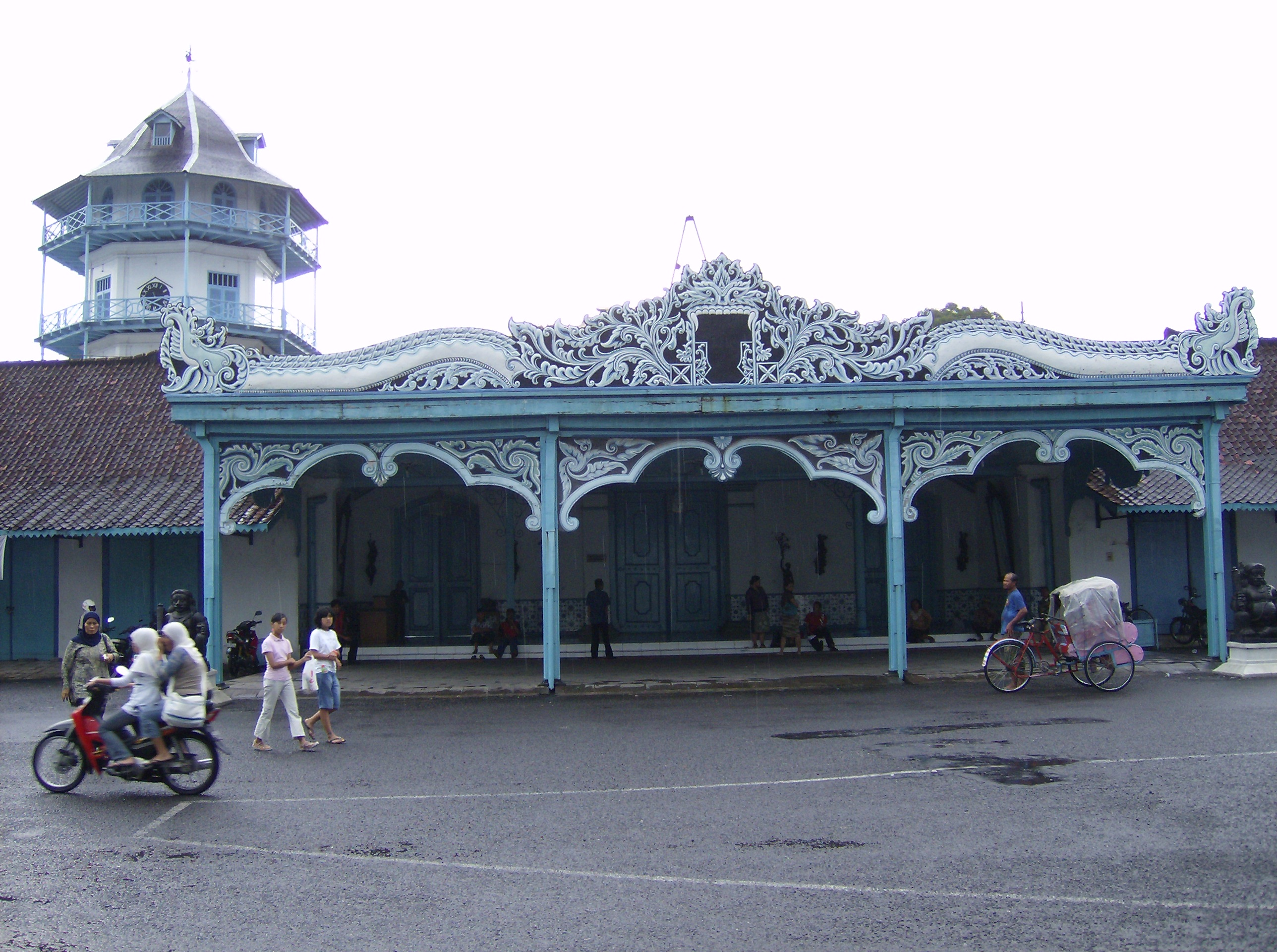
Kori Kamandungan, an entrance gate into Surakarta kraton

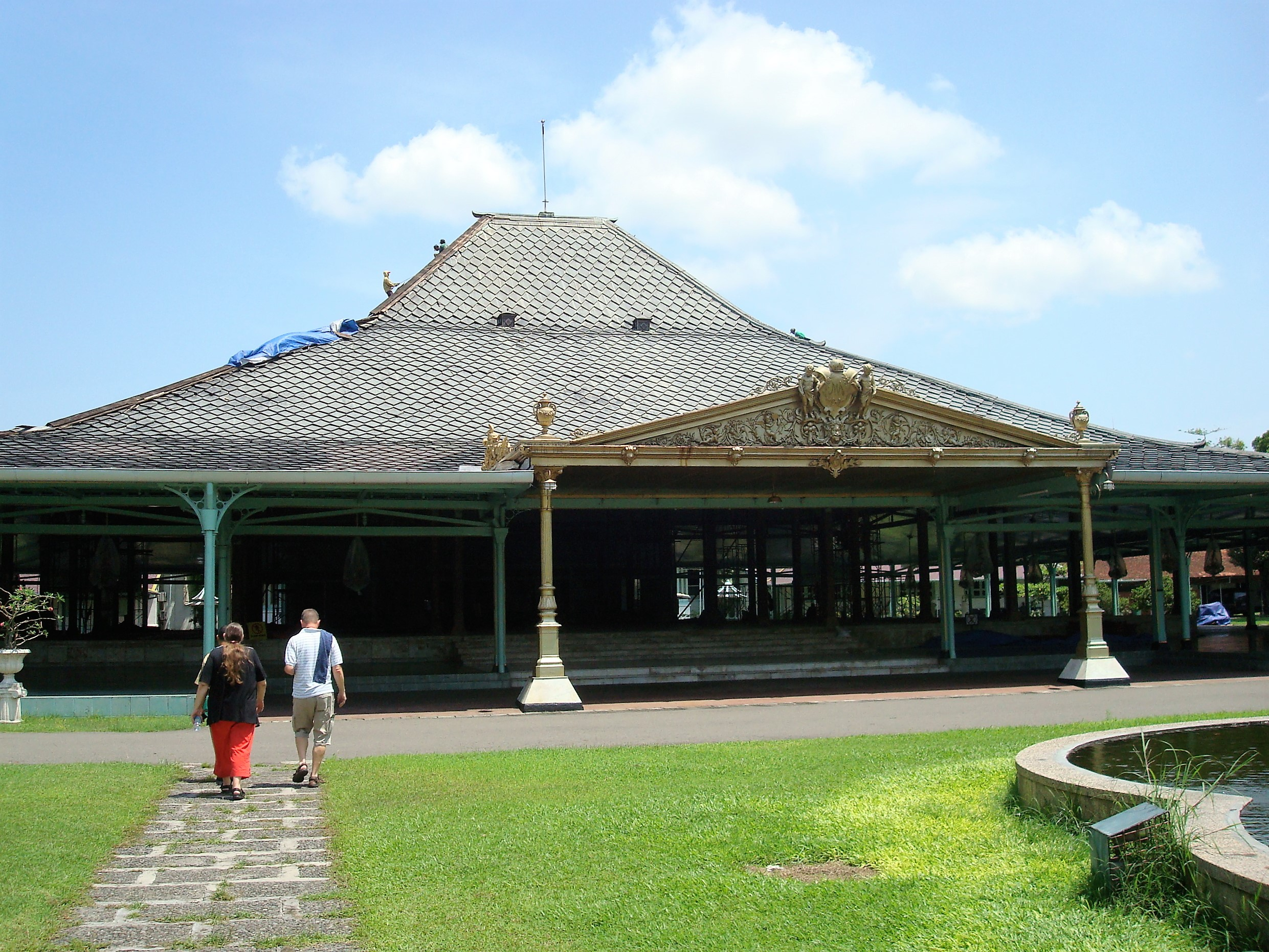
The grand pendopo of Pura Mangkunegaran

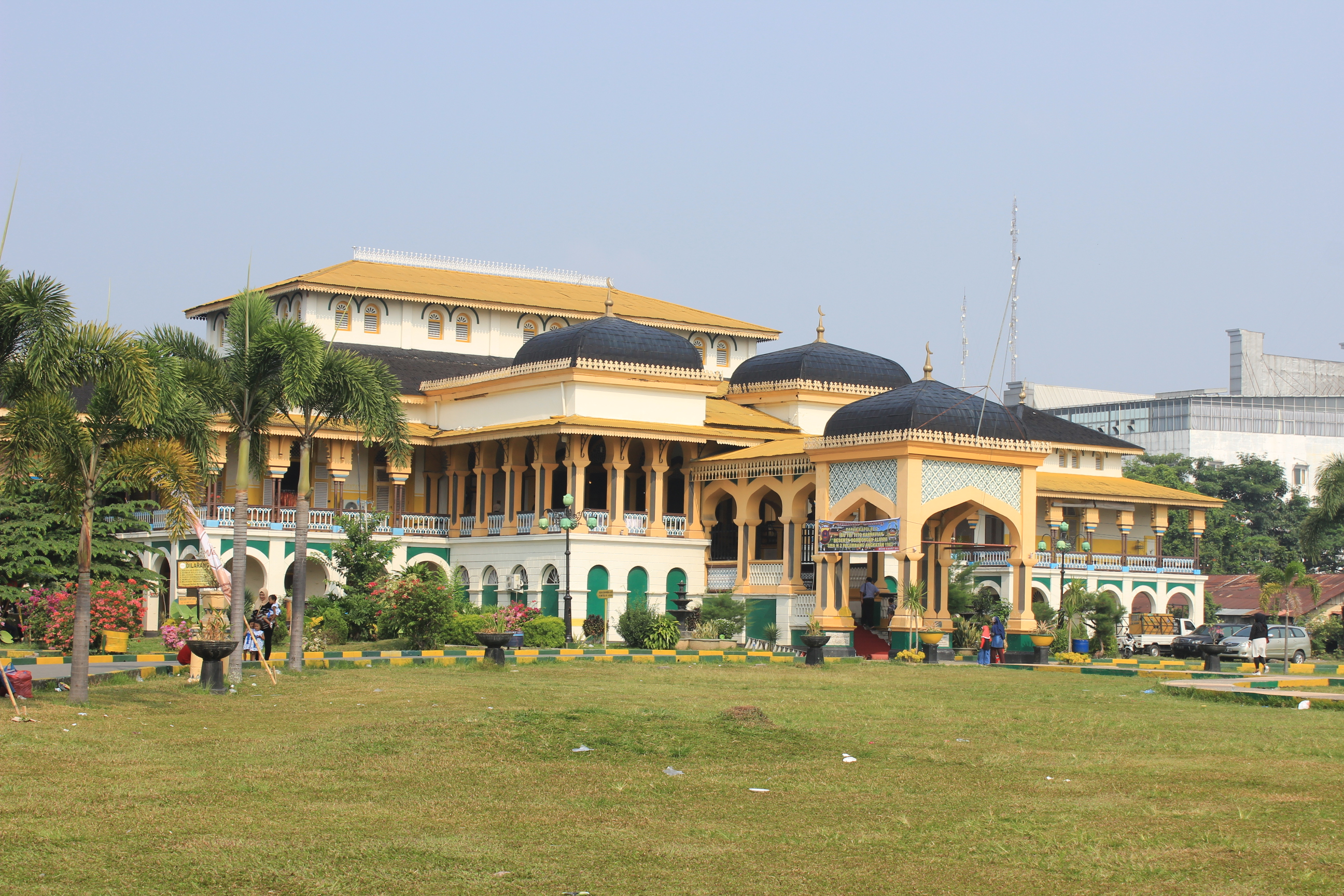
Halaman of Maimun Palace

== Colonial architecture ==
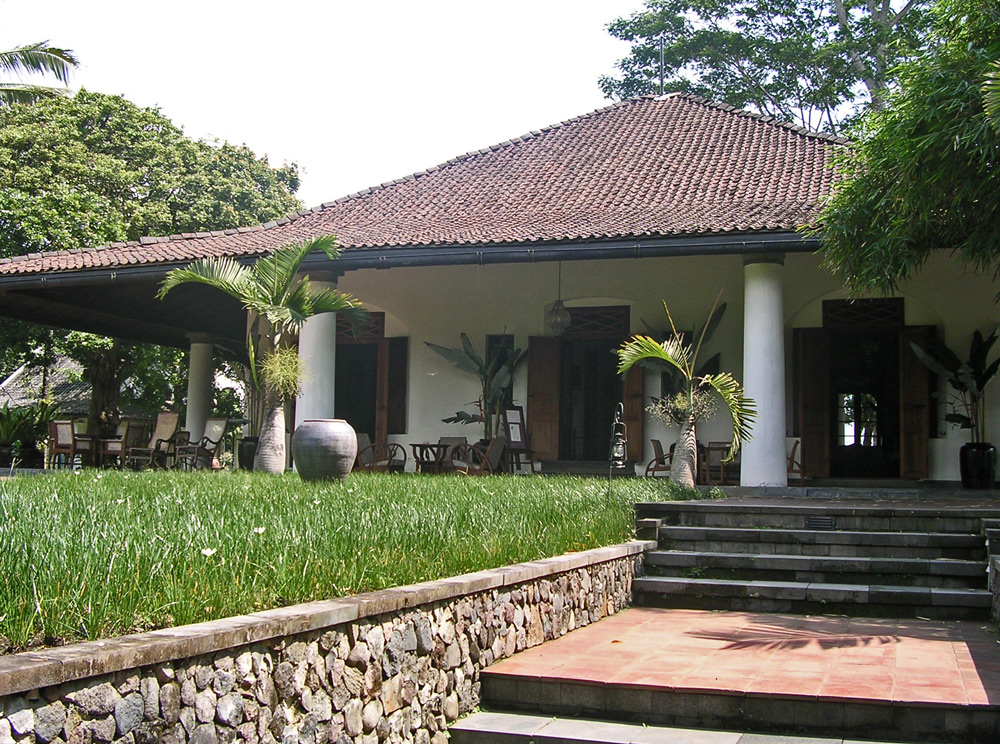
Javanese and neo-classical Indo-European hybrid villa. Note the Javanese roof form and general similarities with the Javanese cottage.

The 16th and 17th centuries saw the arrival of European powers in Indonesia who used masonry for much of their construction. Previously timber and its by-products had been almost exclusively used in Indonesia, with the exception of some major religious and palace architecture. One of the first major Dutch settlements was Batavia (later renamed Jakarta) which in the 17th and 18th centuries was a fortified brick and masonry city.

For almost two centuries, the colonialists did little to adapt their European architectural habits to the tropical climate. In Batavia, for example, they constructed canals through its low-lying terrain, which were fronted by small-windowed and poorly ventilated row houses, mostly in a Chinese-Dutch hybrid style. The canals became dumping grounds for noxious waste and sewage and an ideal breeding ground for the anopheles mosquitos, with malaria and dysentery becoming rife throughout the Dutch East Indies colonial capital.

Although row houses, canals and enclosed solid walls were first thought as protection against tropical diseases coming from tropical air, years later the Dutch learnt to adapt their architectural style with local building features (long eaves, verandahs, porticos, large windows and ventilation openings). The Indies Style of middle 18th century were among the first colonial buildings to incorporate Indonesian architectural elements and attempt adapting to the climate. The basic form, such as the longitudinal organisation of spaces and use of joglo and limasan roof structures, was Javanese, but it incorporated European decorative elements such as neoclassical columns around deep verandahs. Whereas the Indies Style homes were essentially Indonesian houses with European trim, by the early 20th century, the trend was for modernist influences—such as art-deco—being expressed in essentially European buildings with Indonesian trim (such as the pictured home's high-pitched roofs with Javan ridge details). Practical measures carried over from the earlier Indo-European hybrids, which responded to the Indonesian climate, included overhanging eaves, larger windows and ventilation in the walls.

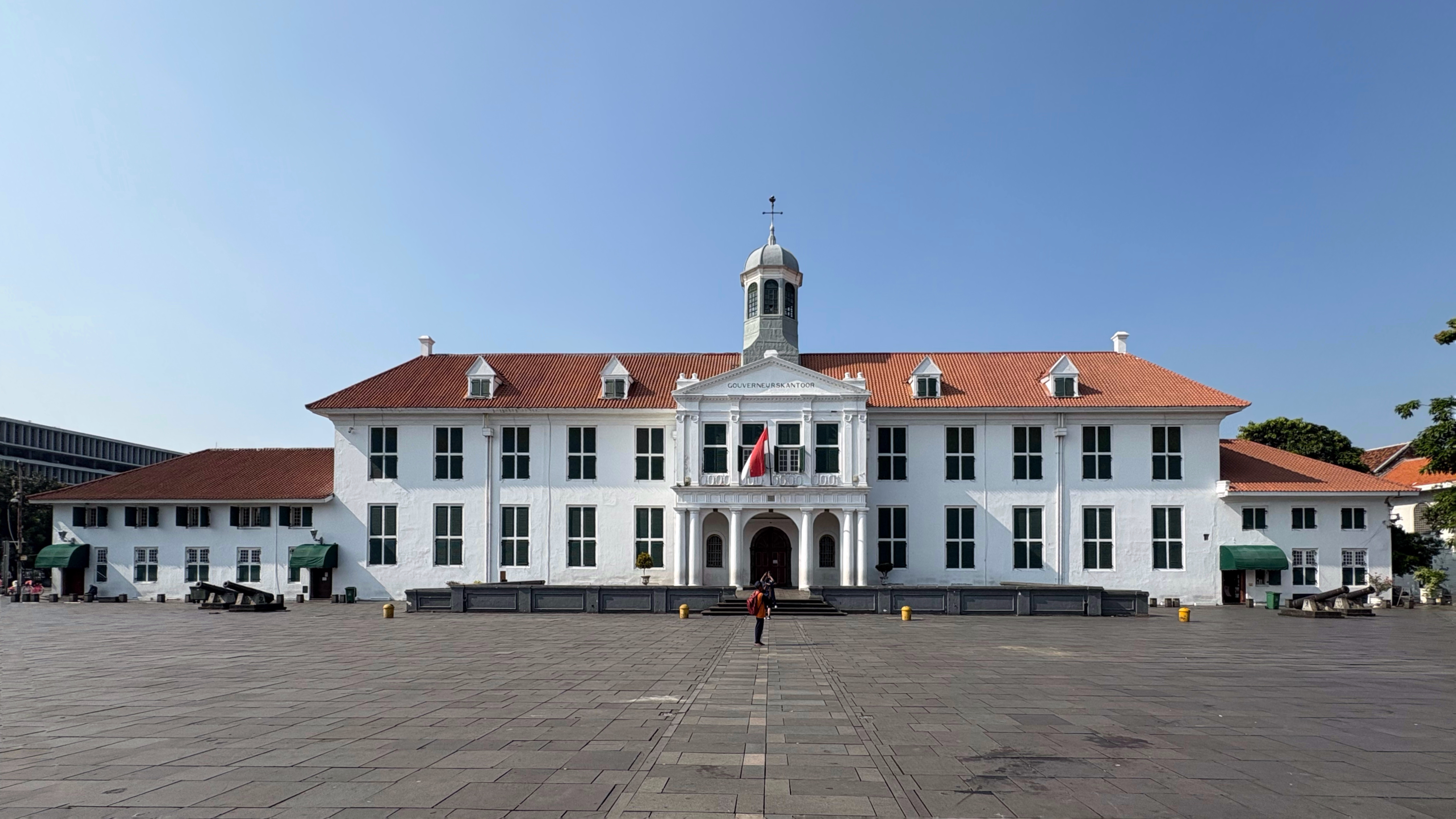
Jakarta History Museum, formerly Batavia City Hall (Stadhuis van Batavia)

At the end of the 19th century, great changes were happening across much of colonial Indonesia, particularly Java. Significant improvements to technology, communications and transportation had brought new wealth to Java's cities and private enterprise was reaching the countryside. Modernistic buildings required for such development appeared in great numbers, and were heavily influenced by international styles. These new buildings included train stations, business hotels, factories and office blocks, hospitals and education institutions. The largest stock of colonial era buildings are in the large cities of Java, such as Bandung, Jakarta, Semarang, and Surabaya. Bandung is of particular note with one of the largest remaining collections of 1920s Art-Deco buildings in the world, with the notable work of several Dutch architects and planners, including Albert Aalbers, Thomas Karsten, Henri Maclaine Pont, J Gerber and C.P.W. Schoemaker. By the early 20th century, various style of architecture were apparent in major cities, namely New Indies Style, Expressionism, Art Deco, Art Nouveau, and Nieuwe Zakelijkheid.

Colonial rule was never as extensive on the island of Bali as it was on Java— it was only in 1906, for example, that the Dutch gained full control of the island—and consequently the island only has a limited stock of colonial architecture. Singaraja, the island's former colonial capital and port, has a number of art-deco kantor style homes, tree-lined streets and dilapidated warehouses. The hill town of Munduk, a town amongst plantations established by the Dutch, is Bali's only other significant group of colonial architecture; a number of mini mansions in the Balinese-Dutch style still survive.

The lack of development due to the Great Depression, the turmoil of the Second World War and Indonesia's independence struggle of the 1940s, and economic stagnation during the politically turbulent 1950s and 60s, meant that much colonial architecture has been preserved through to recent decades. Although colonial homes were almost always the preserve of the wealthy Dutch, Indonesian and Chinese elites, and colonial buildings in general are unavoidably linked with the human suffering of colonialism, the styles were often rich and creative combinations of two cultures, so much so that the homes remain sought after into the 21st century.

Native architecture was arguably more influenced by the new European ideas than colonial architecture was influenced by Indonesian styles; and these Western elements continue to be a dominant influence on Indonesia's built environment today.

Early twentieth century modernisms are still very evident across much of Indonesia, especially in urban areas. The 1930s world depression was devastating and was followed by another decade of war, revolution and struggle, which restricted the development of built environments.

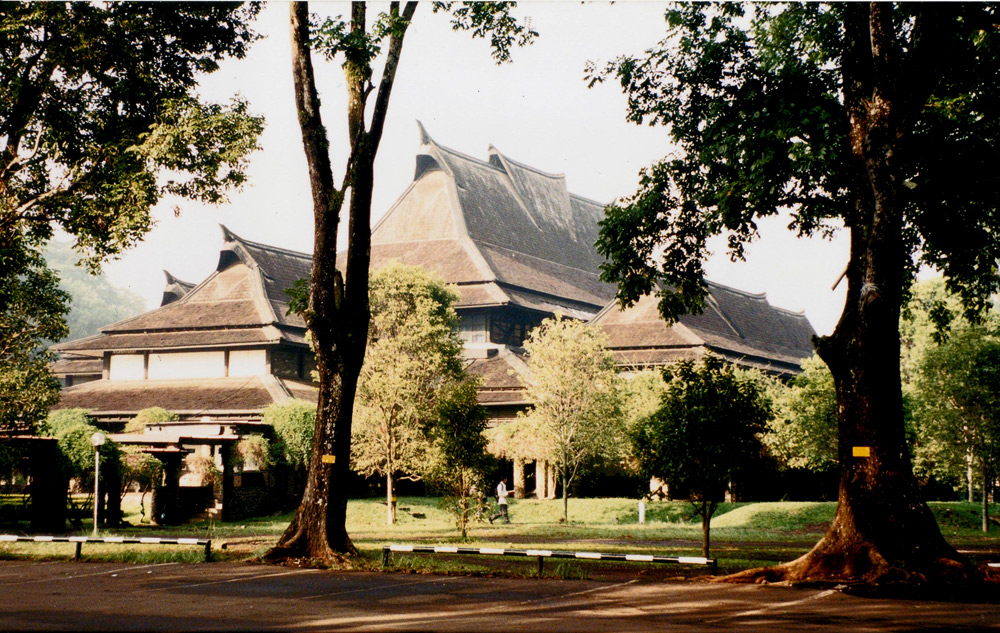
Ceremonial Hall, Bandung Institute of Technology, Bandung, by architect Henri Maclaine Pont

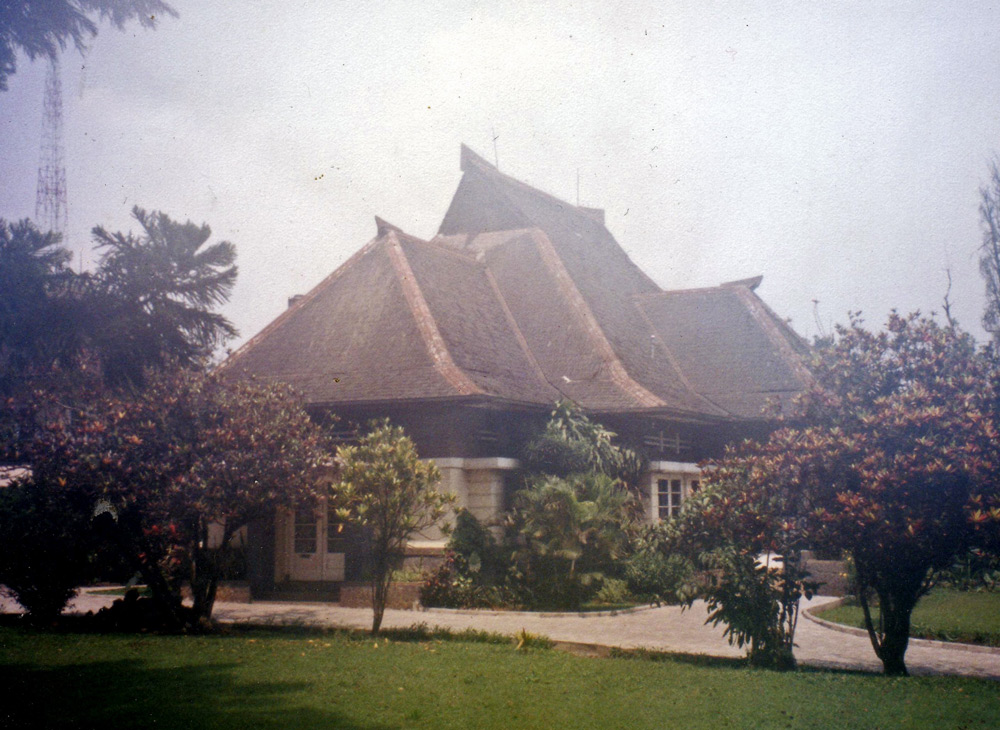
This pre-war Bandung home is an example of 20th century Indonesian Dutch Colonial styles.

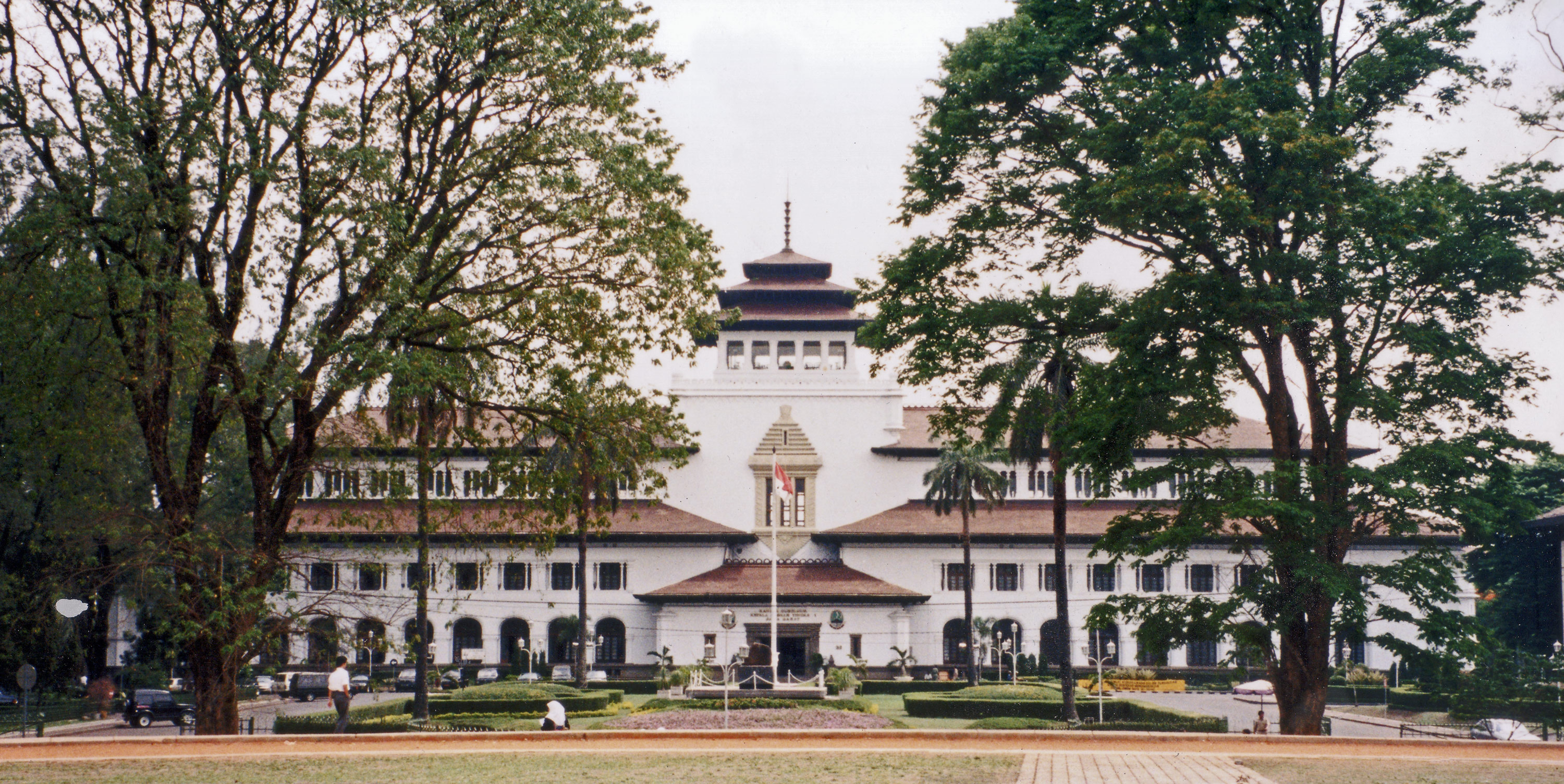
The city hall Gedung Sate of Bandung

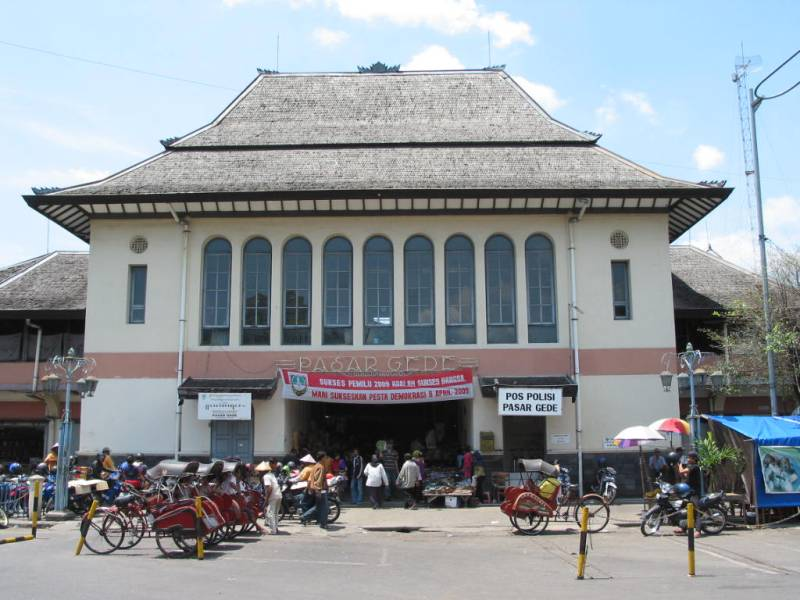
Pasar Gede Harjonagoro in Surakarta.

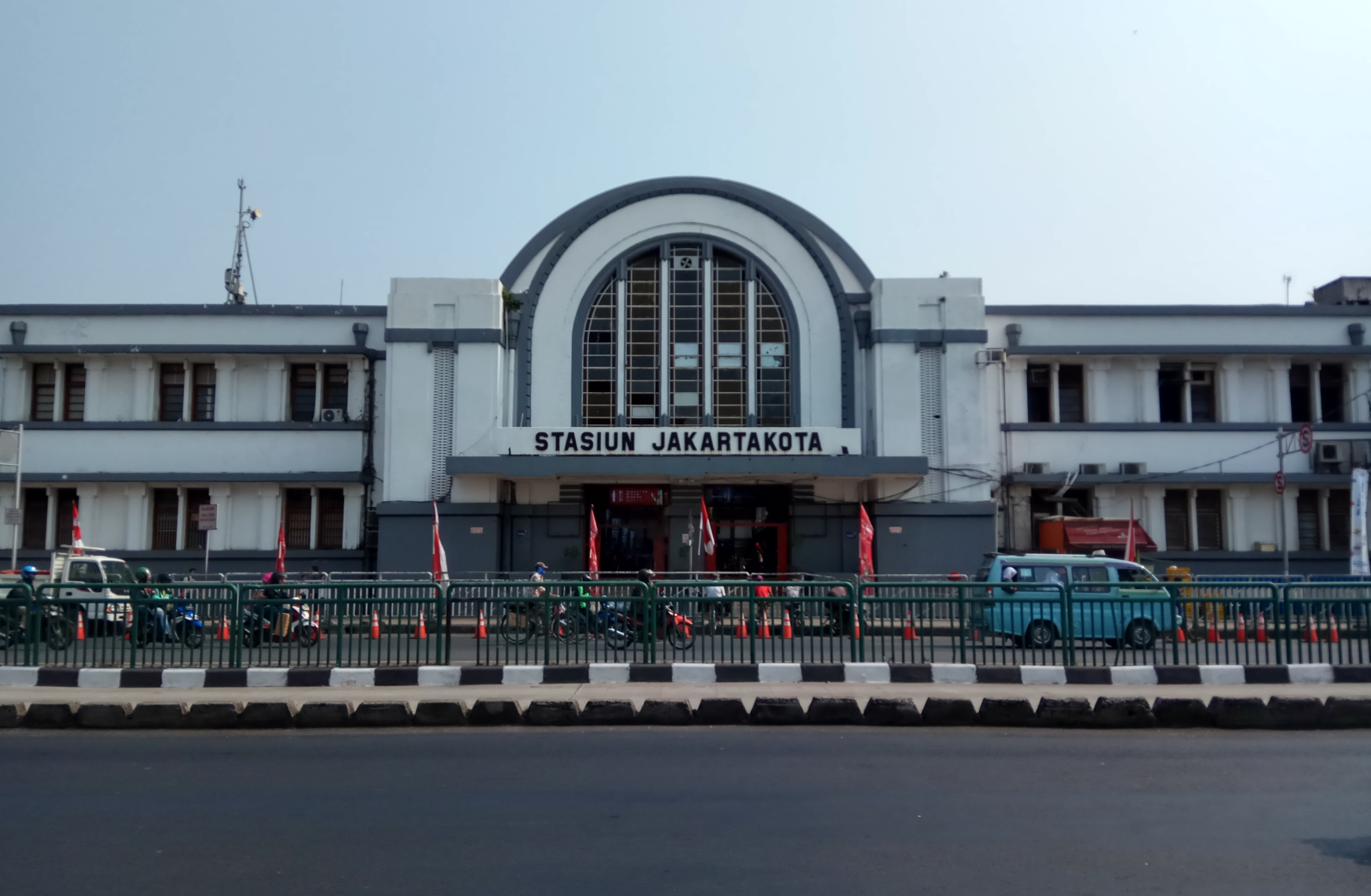
Jakarta Kota railway station, an example of Art Deco style in Batavia

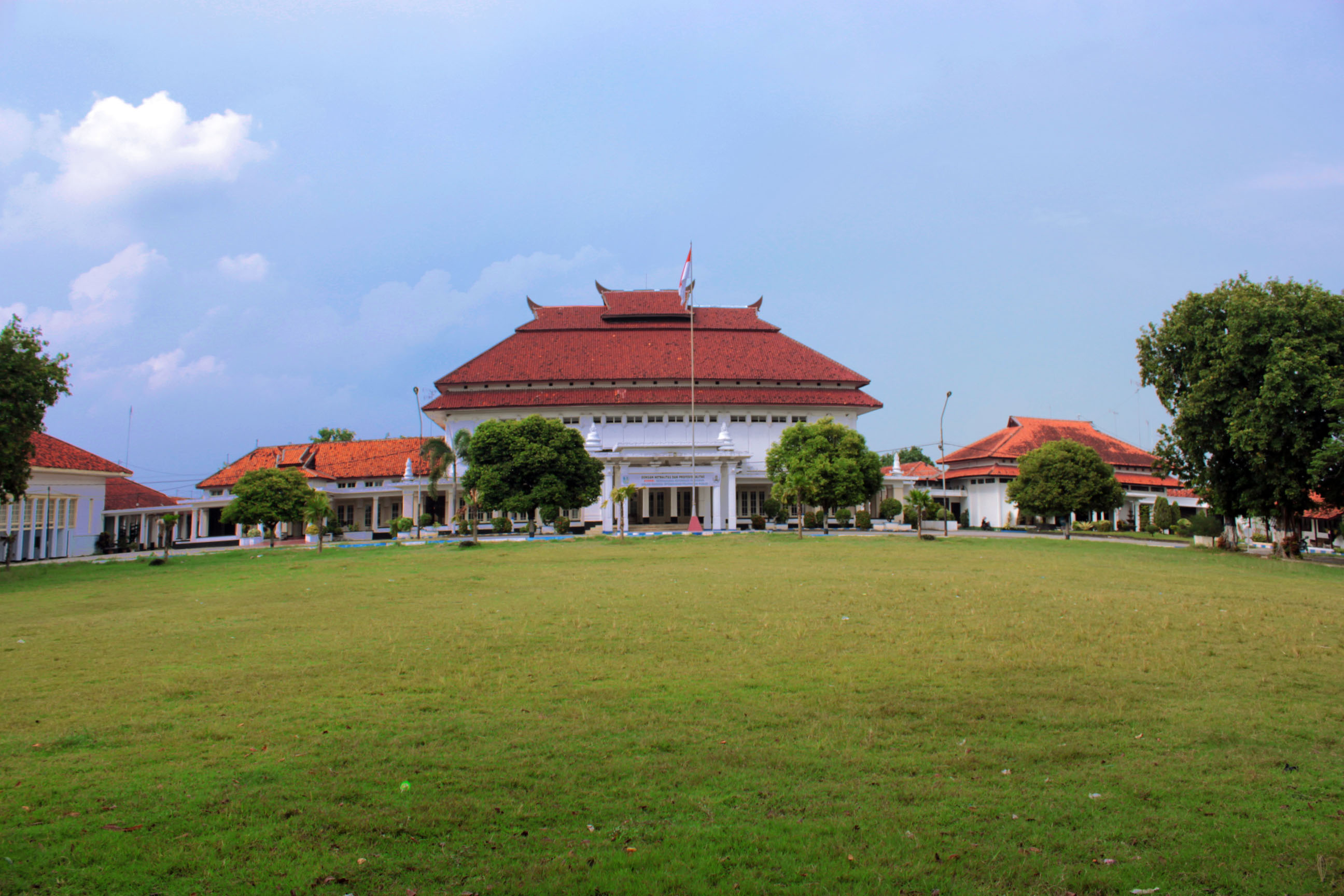
Bakorwil Pamekasan in Art Deco style with native Indonesian architecture

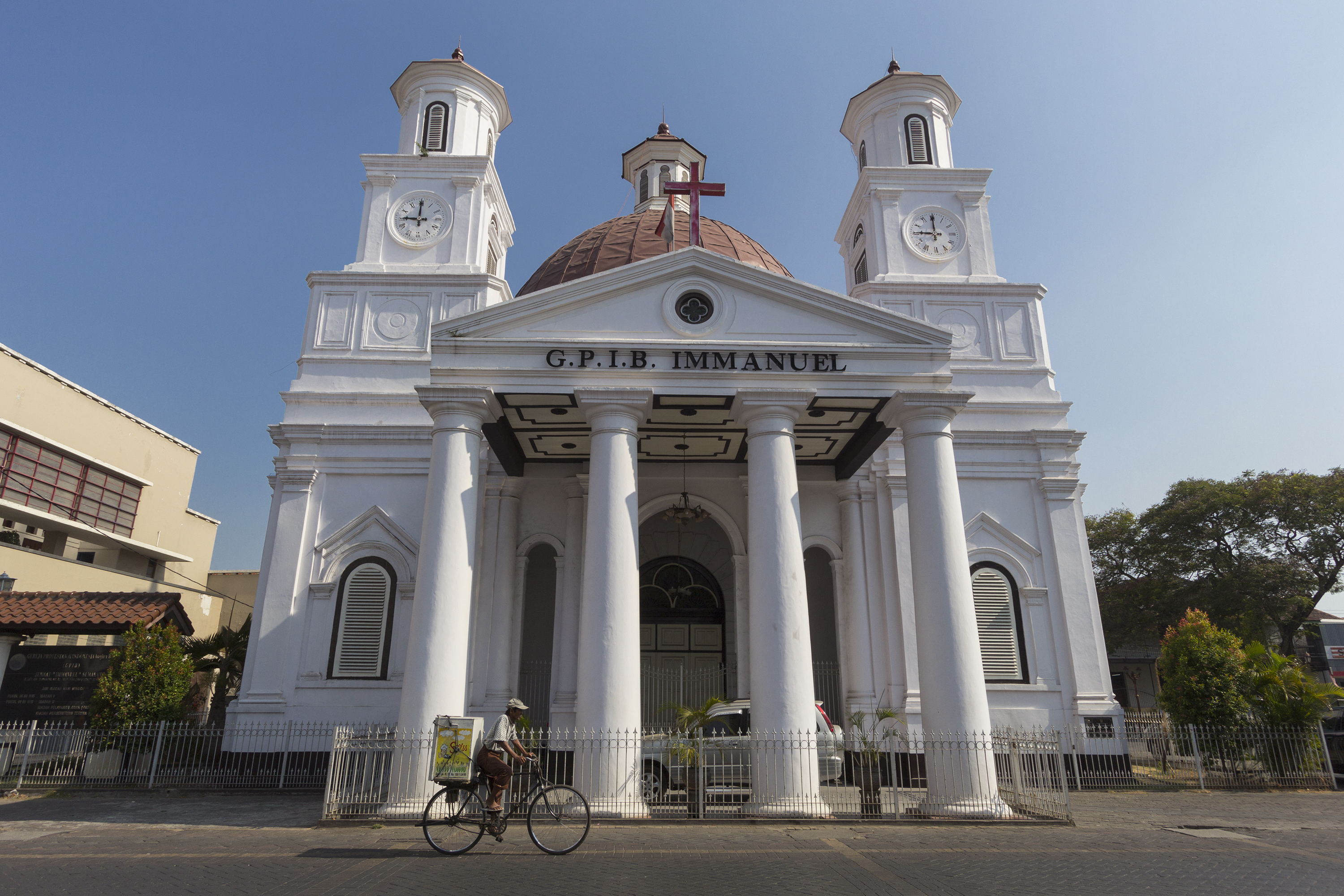
Blenduk Church in Semarang

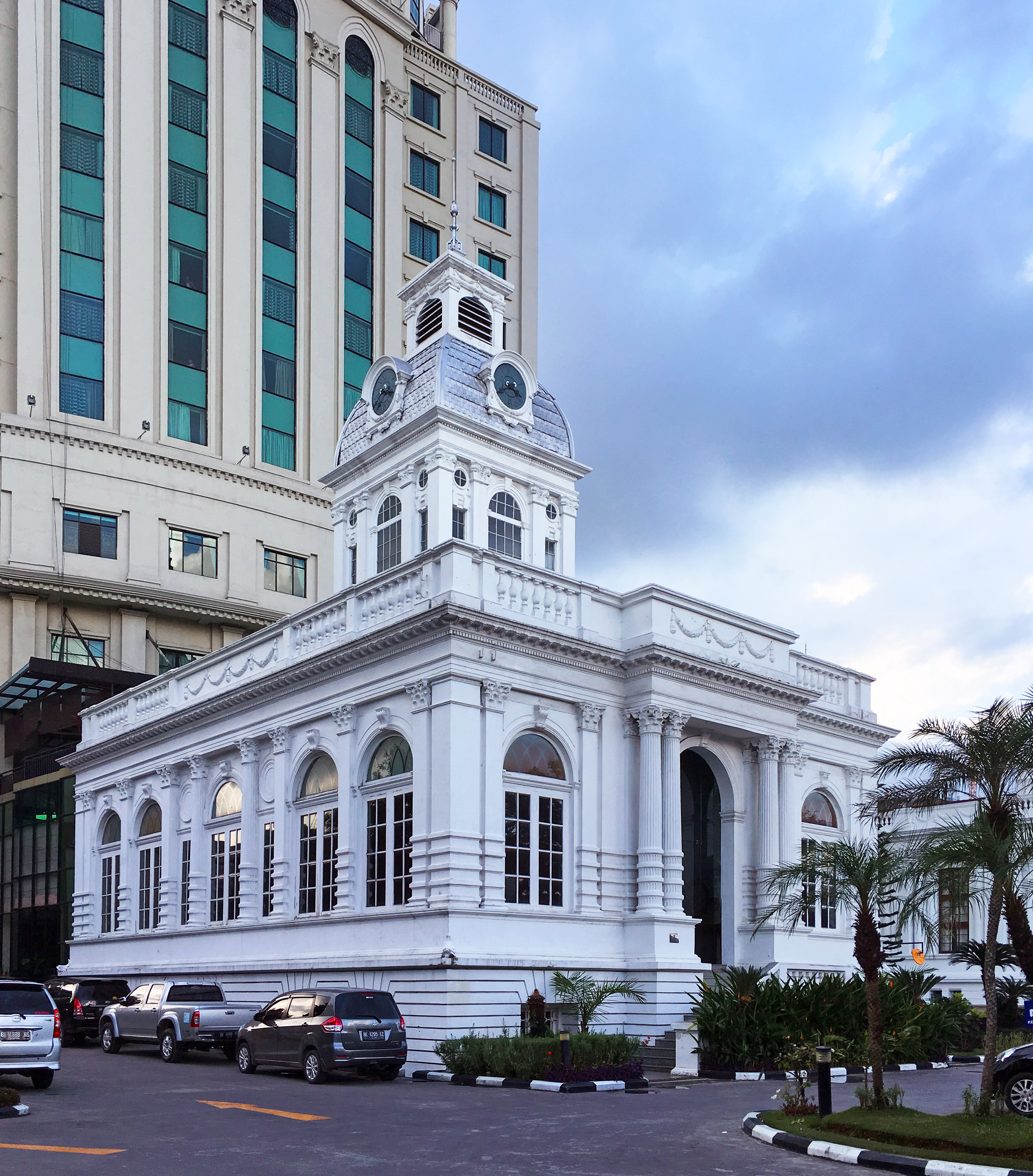
Old City Hall of Medan

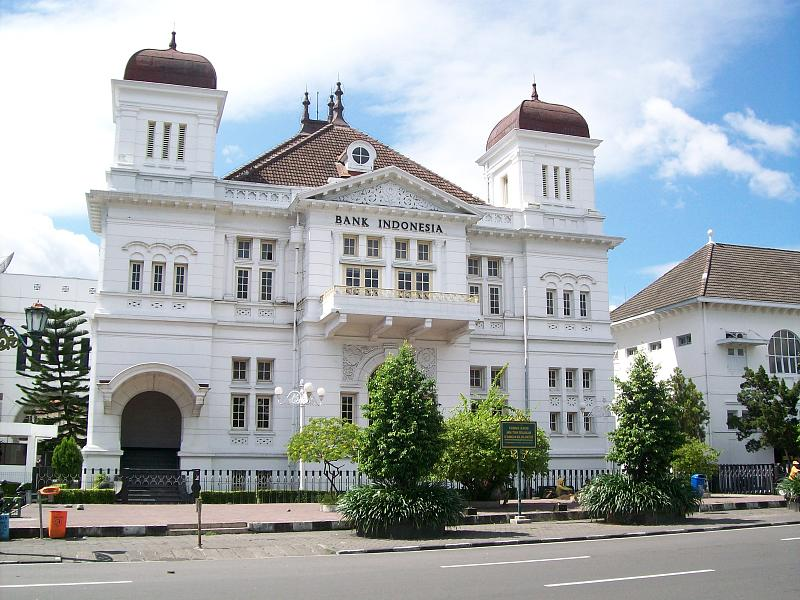
Bank Indonesia (formerly De Javasche Bank), Yogyakarta

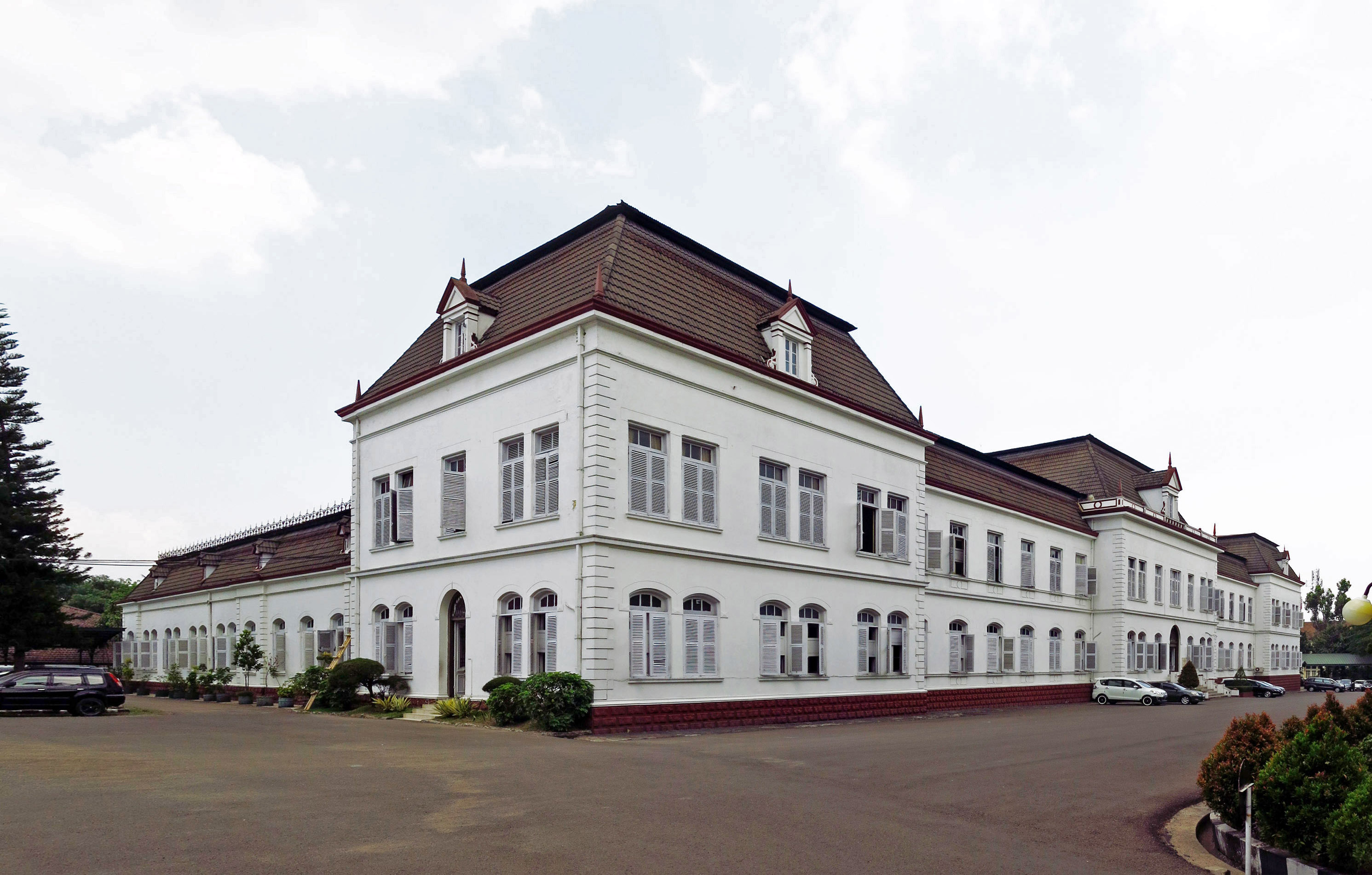
Gedung Sabahu, Bandung

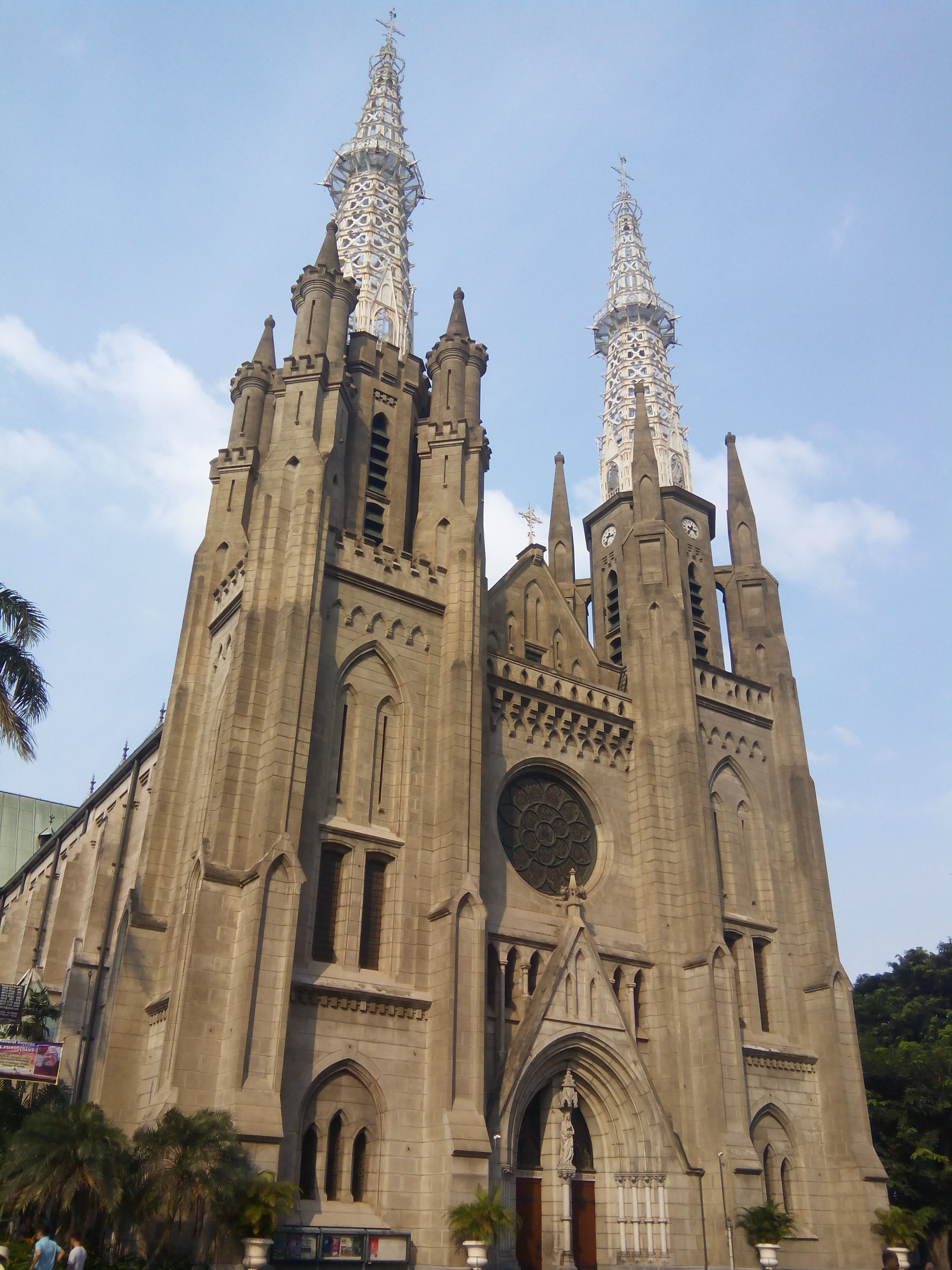
Jakarta Cathedral, an example of Gothic Revival architecture

== Post independence architecture ==
Istiqlal the largest mosque in Southeast Asia by Frederich Silaban.

The Javanese art-deco style from the 1920s became the root for the first Indonesian national style in the 1950s. The politically turbulent 1950s meant that the new but bruised Indonesia was neither able to afford or focused to follow the new international movements such as modernist brutalism. Continuity from the 1920s and 30s through to the 1950s was further supported by Indonesian planners who had been colleagues of the Dutch Karsten, and they continued many of his principles. Among the country's first generation of professionally trained architects were Mohammad Soesilo, Liem Bwan Tjie, Soejoedi Wirjoatmodjo and Friedrich Silaban, who would later establish the Indonesian Institute of Architects (Indonesian: Ikatan Arsitek Indonesia).

Let us prove that we can also build the country like the Europeans and Americans do because we are equal

— Sukarno

The iconic Grand Mosque of West Sumatra, a new modern gigantic mosque that is built with Minangkabau architecture.

Despite the new country's economic woes, government-funded major projects were undertaken in the modernist style, particularly in the capital Jakarta. Reflecting President Sukarno's political views, the architecture is openly nationalistic and strives to show the new nation's pride in itself. Projects approved by Sukarno, himself a civil engineer who had acted as an architect, include:

- A clover-leaf interchange bridge.
- A broad boulevard in Jakarta, Jalan Jenderal Sudirman.
- Four high-rise hotels including the famous Hotel Indonesia.
- A new parliament building.
- The 127 000-seat Bung Karno Stadium.
- Numerous monuments including The National Monument.
- Istiqlal Mosque the largest mosque in Southeast Asia.

The 1950s jengki style, so named after Indonesian references to the American armed forces as 'yankee', was a distinctive Indonesian architectural style that emerged. The modernist cubic and strict geometric forms that the Dutch had used before World War II, were transformed into more complicated volumes, such as pentagons or other irregular solids. This architecture is an expression of the political spirit of freedom among the Indonesians.

When development picked up in the early 1970s under Soeharto's New Order administration following the turbulent mid-century decades, Indonesian architects were inspired by the strong American influence in Indonesia's architecture faculties following independence. The International Style dominated in Indonesia in the 1970s, as it did in much of the rest of the world.

International style of Hotel Indonesia

The headquarter of ASEAN by architect Soejoedi Wirjoatmodjo

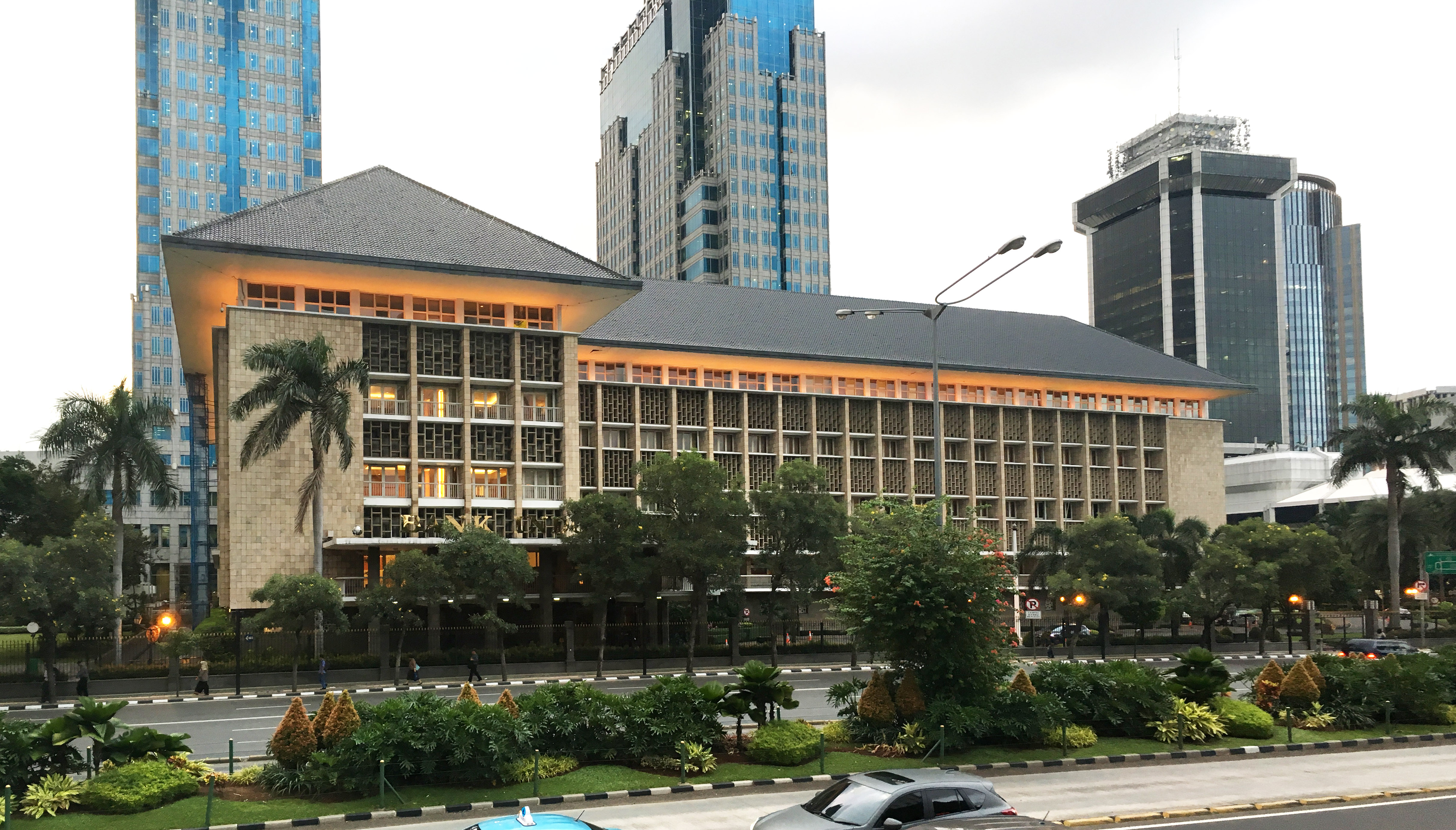
The old headquarter of Bank Indonesia by Frederich Silaban

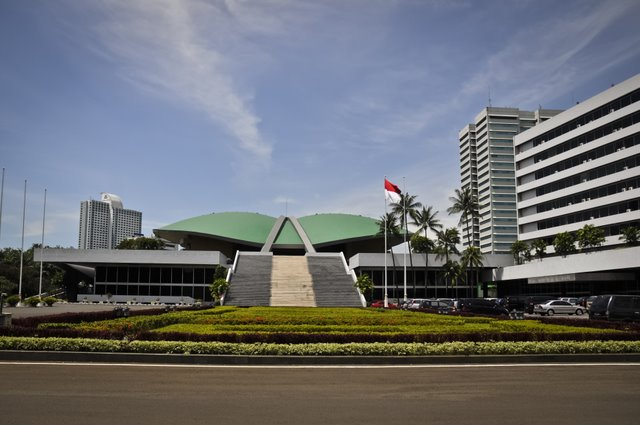
MPR/DPR building in Indonesia

The 1970s saw the Indonesian government promote indigenous Indonesian forms. Constructed in 1975, the Taman Mini Indonesia Indah theme park re-created over twenty buildings of exaggerated proportions to showcase Indonesian traditional vernacular forms. The government also called for Indonesian architects to design an Indonesian architecture, and by the 1980s in particular, most public buildings were built with exaggerated elements of traditional vernacular forms. These works includes the large concrete Minangkabau style roofs on government buildings in the city of Padang, the giant Javanese joglo structures at the University of Gadjah Mada, and also the Javanese-Balinese meru multi-tiered roofs of rectorate tower in University of Indonesia.

Despite this commendable effort to try to define Indonesian architecture, through drawing inspirations from native elements of Indonesian vernacular architecture and traditions, the practice and results might not be fulfilling expectations. Sometimes the result is mediocre, criticized as superficial addition upon modern building – by merely applying traditional ornaments or just attaching traditional roofs. Nevertheless, there are some exceptional result of this effort, such as the original design of Soekarno-Hatta International Airport terminal 1 and 2, that create an airport terminal within tropical garden. The airport is formed as a collection of Javanese pendopo pavilions, akin to Javanese keraton compound.

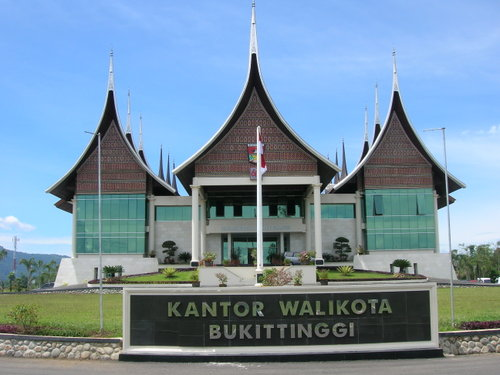
City Hall in Bukittinggi with traditional Minangkabau elements with modern architecture

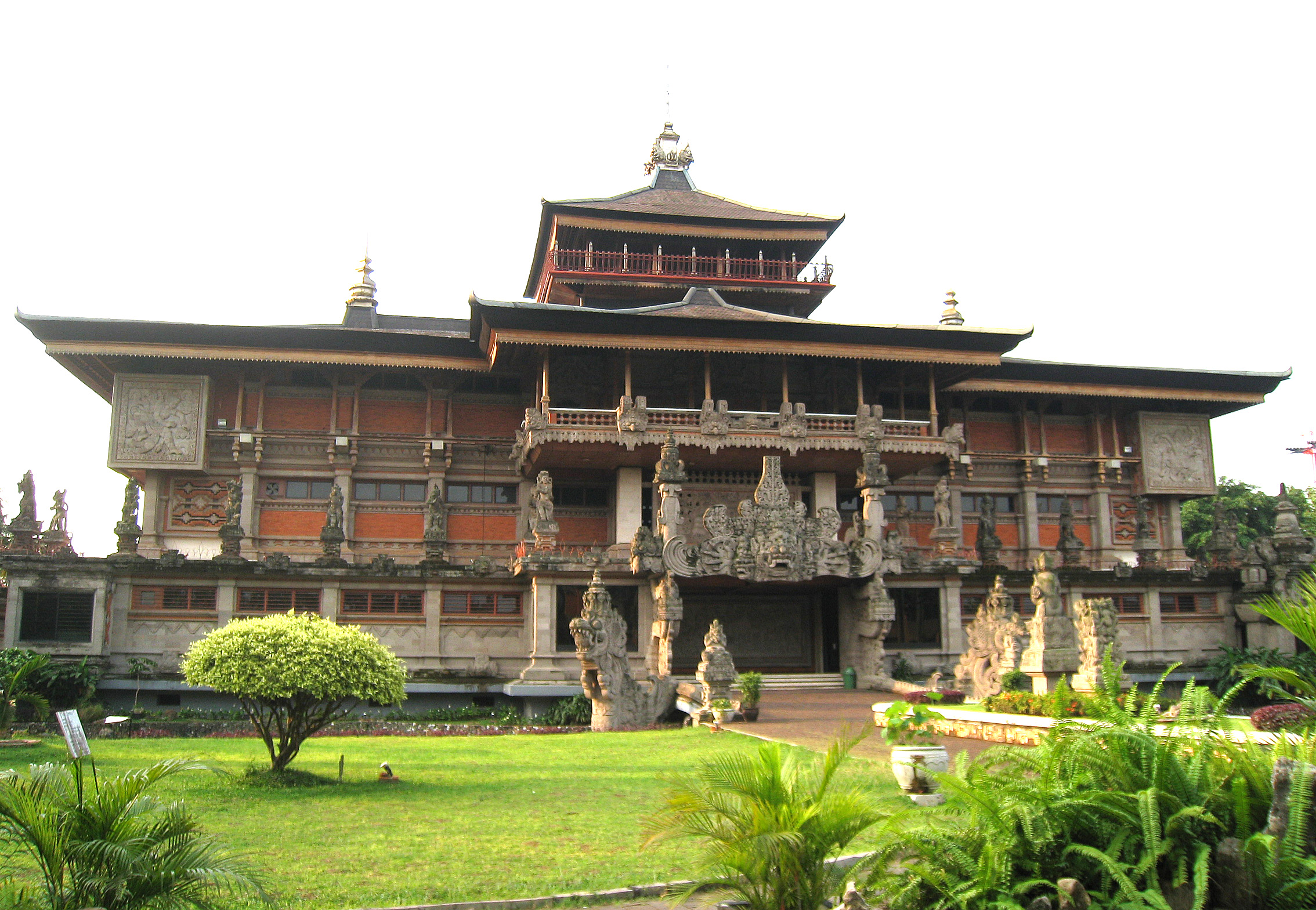
Indonesia Museum in TMII with elaborate Balinese architecture applied on large structure.

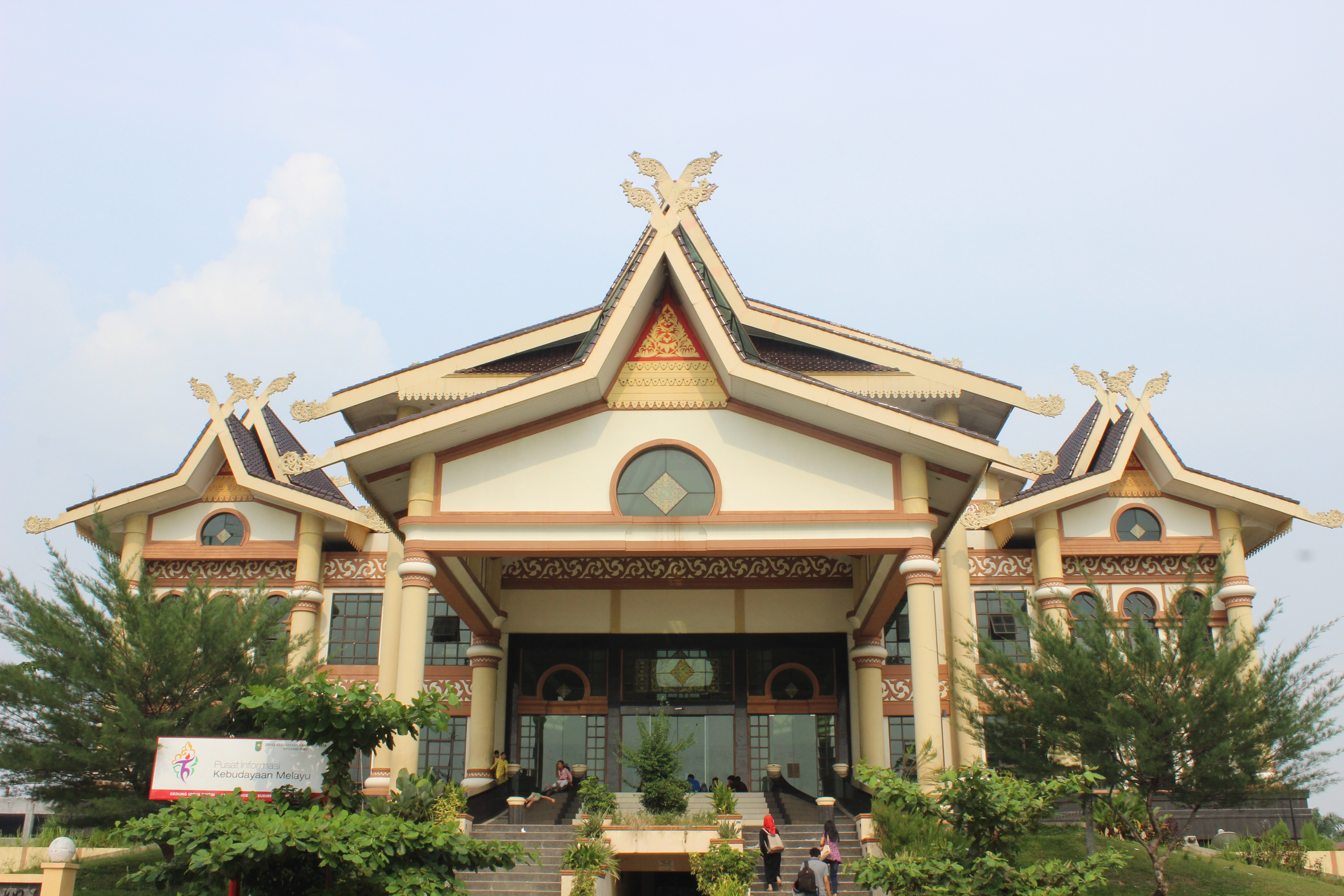
Anjung Seni Idrus Tintin in Pekanbaru with exaggerated Malay houses architecture

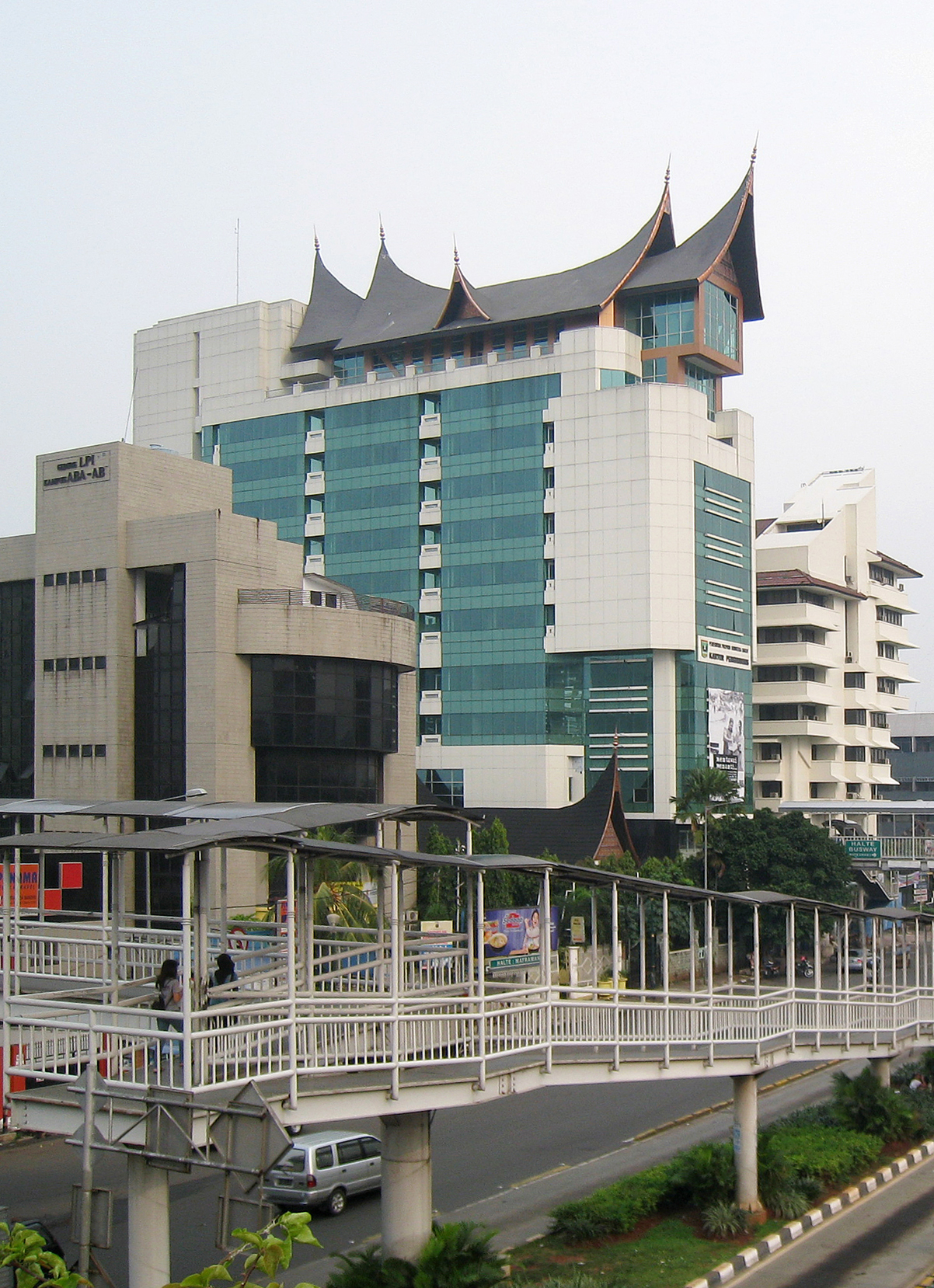
The West Sumatra representative office in Jakarta with bagonjong roof of Minangkabau architecture

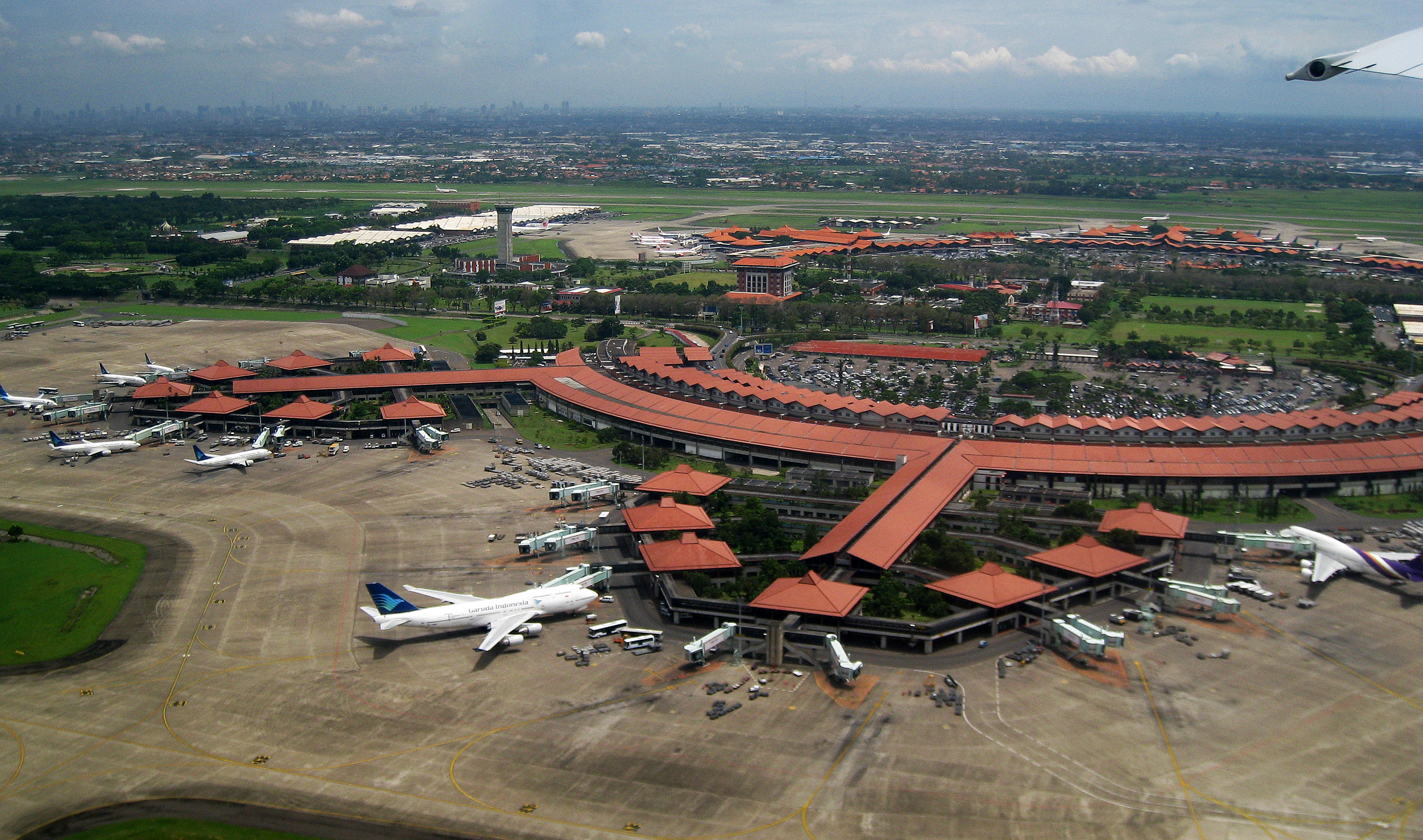
Soekarno-Hatta International Airport formed as a collection of Javanese pendopo pavilions

Ngurah Rai International Airport combines traditional Balinese elements with modern architecture

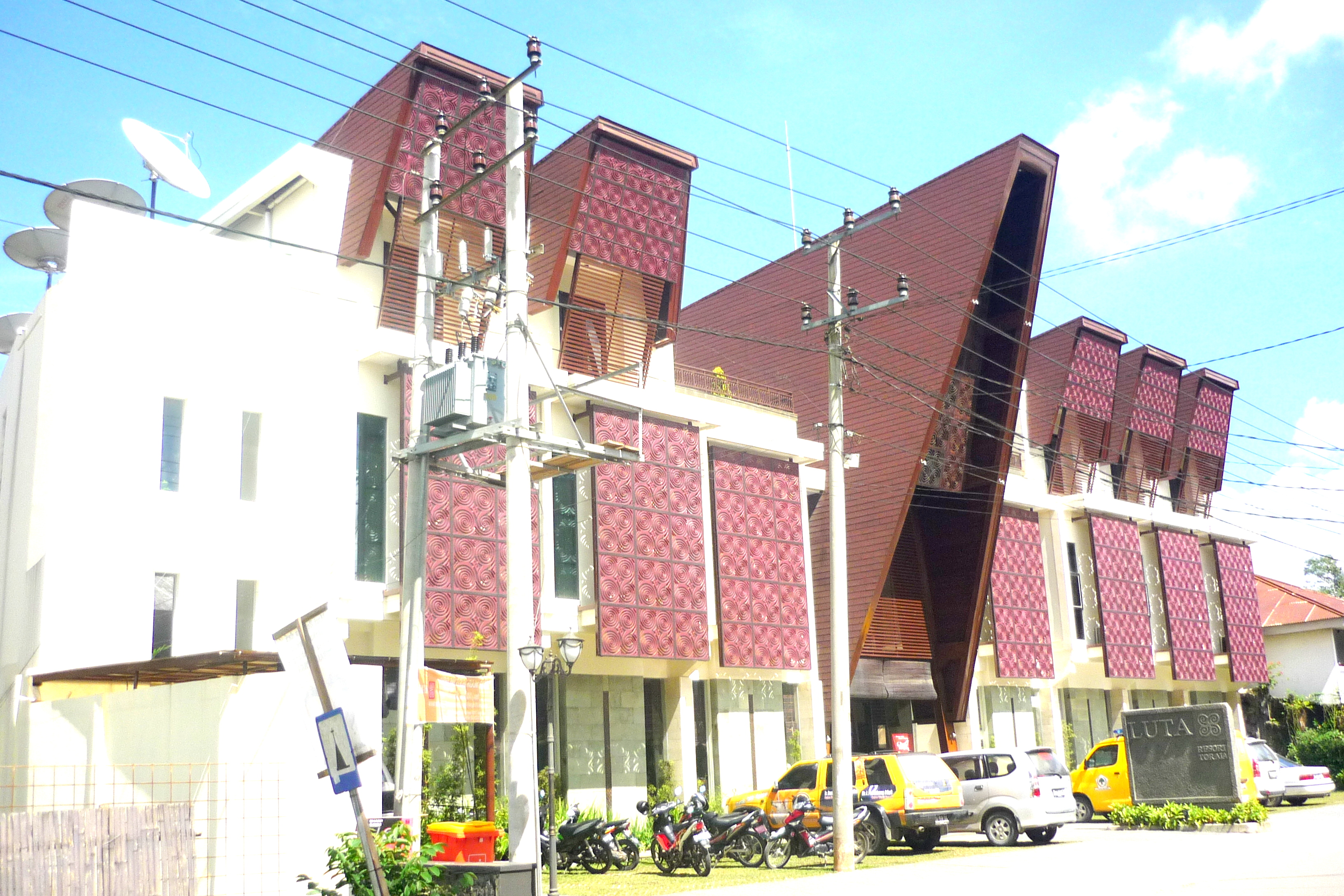
A resort in North Toraja with traditional Torajan designs

== Contemporary architecture ==
Wisma 46 in post-modernist style, currently the second tallest building in Indonesia.

The 1970s, 1980s and 1990s saw foreign investment and economic growth; large construction booms brought major changes to Indonesian cities, including the replacement of the early twentieth styles with late modern and postmodern styles. The urban construction booms have continued in the 21st century and are shaping skylines in Indonesian cities. Many new buildings are clad with shiny glass surfaces to reflect the tropical sun. Architectural styles are influenced by developments in architecture internationally, including the introduction of deconstructivism architecture.

Aceh Tsunami Museum

== See also ==
- Influence of Indian Hindu temple architecture on Southeast Asia
- History of Indian influence on Southeast Asia
- Landhuis
- Indies Empire style
- New Indies Style

== Bibliography ==
- Beal, Gillian (202). Island Style: Tropical Dream Houses in Indonesia. Hong Kong: Periplis Editions Ltd. ISBN 962-593-415-4.
- Dawson, B., Gillow, J., The Traditional Architecture of Indonesia, 1994 Thames and Hudson Ltd, London, ISBN 0-500-34132-X
- Helmi, Rio; Walker, Barbara (1995). Bali Style. London: Times Editions Pte Ltd. ISBN 0-500-23714-X.
- Schoppert, P., Damais, S., Java Style, 1997, Didier Millet, Paris, 207 pages, ISBN 962-593-232-1
- Wijaya, M., Architecture of Bali: A source book of traditional and modern forms, 2002 Archipelago Press, Singapore, 224 pages, ISBN 981-4068-25-X
- Peter JM. Nas, The House in Indonesia
