= List of mosques in Indonesia =

This is a list of mosques in Indonesia. The Indonesian term Masjid Agung is translated as "Great Mosque", while Masjid Raya is translated as "Grand Mosque." Masjid Keramat is translated as "Holy Mosque." Masjid Jami is translated as Jami Mosque which refers to the congregational mosque where the weekly Friday prayer takes place. These lists only include notable mosques.

== List ==
As of 2020, a government team led by Fakhry Affan has registered 554,152 mosques in Indonesia. This consists of 258,958 congregational mosques and 295,194 small mosques which fit 40 people or fewer. The government estimates total number of mosques at more than 740,000 nationwide. To be included in this list, the mosque has to be a landmark of a particular region and historically notable.

Name	Images	Location	Year	Remarks
Great Mosque of Demak		Demak (6.8946°S 110.6374°E), Central Java	1466–1474	One of the oldest surviving mosques in Indonesia. Renovated in 1506.
Istiqlal Mosque		Jakarta	1978	
Al-Azhar Great Mosque		Jakarta	1958	
Al-Hakim Mosque		Padang, West Sumatra	2020	
Asasi Mosque		Padang Panjang, West Sumatra	1770	
Azizi Mosque		Langkat Regency, North Sumatra	1902	
Great Mosque of Banten		Serang (6.0360°S 106.1540°E), Banten	1552	
Kasunyatan Mosque		Kasunyatan, Serang (6.0509°S 106.1572°E)	1570–1596	
Kali Pasir Mosque		Tangerang (6.18°S 106.63°E), Banten	1700	
Ats-Tsauroh Great Mosque of Serang		Serang	1870	
Al-Azhom Grand Mosque		Tangerang	2003	
Baitul Mukhtar Grand Mosque		Tangerang	2025	
Al-Bantani Grand Mosque		Serang	2010	
Kapal Bosok Mosque		Serang	2014	
Al-Anshor Mosque		Jakarta (6.1390°S 106.8069°E)	1648	Constructed by Muslim traders from Bengal and Gujarat.
Al-Mansur Mosque		Jakarta (6.15°S 106.81°E)	1717	
Luar Batang Mosque		Jakarta (6.1239°S 106.8065°E)	1736	
Jami Kampung Baru Inpak Mosque		Jakarta (6.1366°S 106.8028°E)	1748	
An-Nawier Mosque		Jakarta (6.1413°S 106.8045°E)	1760	
Angke Mosque		Jakarta (6.1434°S 106.7959°E)	1761	
Al-Mukarromah Jami Mosque		Jakarta	1879	Contains tombs of venerated ulama from Batavia.
Cut Meutia Mosque		Jakarta	1922	
Al-Makmur Mosque		Jakarta	1932	
Great Mosque of Sunda Kelapa		Jakarta	1970	
Jakarta Islamic Center		Jakarta	1972	
At-Tin Mosque		Jakarta	1997	
Ramlie Musofa Mosque		Jakarta	2016	
KH Hasyim Asy'ari Grand Mosque		Jakarta	2017	
Red Mosque of Panjunan		Cirebon (6.7175°S 108.5660°E), West Java	1480	
Great Mosque of Cirebon		Cirebon (6.725547°S 108.569919°E)	1489–1498	Also known as Sang Ciptarasa Great Mosque. Part of the Kraton Kasepuhan.
Great Mosque of Sumedang		Sumedang, West Java	17th century	
Great Mosque of Cianjur		Cianjur, West Java	1810	
Grand Mosque of Bandung		Bandung, West Java	1812	Renovated in 1955, 1971, and 2001.
Great Mosque of Garut		Garut, West Java	1813	Renovated in 1949, 1979, and 1998.
Manonjaya Great Mosque		Manonjaya, Tasikmalaya (7.3513°S 108.3071°E), West Java	1834	
Great Mosque of Tasikmalaya		Tasikmalaya, West Java	1888	
Great Mosque of Sukabumi		Sukabumi, West Java	19th century	
At-Taqwa Mosque, Cirebon		Cirebon	1951	
Salman Mosque ITB		Bandung	1972	Mosque of the Bandung Institute of Technology.
Bogor Grand Mosque		Bogor, West Java	1979	
Al-Furqon Mosque UPI		Bandung	1980	Mosque of the Indonesia University of Education.
Ukhuwah Islamiyah Mosque UI		Depok, West Java	1987	Mosque of the University of Indonesia Depok campus.
Al-Ukhuwah Mosque		Bandung	1998	
Dian Al-Mahri Mosque		Depok (6.384098°S 106.772003°E)	2006	
Al-Irsyad Mosque		Bandung, West Java	2010	
Trans Studio Great Mosque		Bandung	2015	
Rahmatan Lil-Alamin Mosque		Indramayu, West Java	2002	Part of the Ma'had Al-Zaytun pesantren.
Al-Jabbar Grand Mosque		Bandung	2022	
Saka Tunggal Mosque		Purwokerto (7.4739°S 109.0557°E), Central Java	1871	Listed among the oldest built mosques by some sources, with the establishment date of 1288. However, the Central Java Province Public Relations Bureau claims the establishment date as 1288 on the Hijri calendar, which is equivalent to the year 1871 on the gregorian calendar.
Menara Kudus Mosque		Kudus (6.8042°S 110.8328°E), Central Java	1549	The year refers to the establishment of the mosque. The current mosque was built in the 20th century.
Mantingan Mosque		Mantingan, Jepara (6.6194°S 110.6683°E), Central Java	1559	
Great Mosque of Kauman Magelang		Magelang (7.477269°S 110.217217°E), Central Java	1670	
An-Nuur Great Mosque of Central Java		Mungkid, Central Java	2024	
Great Mosque of Jepara		Jepara	1660s	
Kauman Mosque of Semarang		Semarang (6.97°S 110.42°E), Central Java	1749	
Nur Sulaiman Grand Mosque of Banyumas		Banyumas, Central Java	1755	
Thousand Crescent Mosque		Purwokerto	-	Under construction
Great Mosque of Surakarta		Surakarta (7.5743°S 110.8266°E), Central Java	1763–1768	The royal mosque of Surakarta Sunanate.
Baitunnur Great Mosque of Pati		Pati, Central Java	1854	Renovated in 1979–1980.
Al-Wustho Mangkunegaran Mosque		Surakarta (7.565304°S 110.821331°E), Central Java	1918	
Great Mosque of Purbalingga		Purbalingga, Central Java	2004	
Layur Mosque		Semarang, Central Java	1802	
Great Mosque of Central Java		Semarang	2006	
Al-Ittihad Mosque Jatibarang		Jatibarang, Central Java	2008	
Sheikh Zayed Grand Mosque		Surakarta	2022	A smaller replica of the Grand Mosque in Abu Dhabi, the U.A.E.
Grand Mosque of Mataram		Yogyakarta	1640	Also known as the Great Mosque of Kotagede.
Kauman Mosque of Pleret		Bantul, Special Region of Yogyakarta	1649	Archaeological site of the mosque ruins.
Kauman Great Mosque		Yogyakarta (7.8039°S 110.3624°E)	1773	
Syuhada Mosque		Yogyakarta	1952	
Jogokariyan Mosque		Yogyakarta	1966	
Soko Tunggal Mosque		Yogyakarta	1972	
UGM Campus Mosque		Sleman, Special Region of Yogyakarta	1999	Mosque of the Gadjah Mada University.
Agung Manunggal Bantul Mosque		Bantul	1987	
Ampel Mosque		Surabaya (7.2296°S 112.7426°E), East Java	1421	Oldest mosque in Surabaya. The original column was built in 1421. The mosque has been restored several times since then.
Sunan Giri Mosque		Gresik, East Java	1544	
Baiturrahman Great Mosque of Banyuwangi		Banyuwangi, East Java	1773	
Great Mosque of Sumenep		Sumenep (7.98°S 112.63°E), East Java	1787	A mosque that exemplifies Portuguese characteristics, not different from mosques in Sri Lanka.
Baitul Hakim Mosque of Madiun		Madiun, East Java	1800	
Great Mosque of Malang		Malang (7.98°S 112.63°E), East Java	1890	The serambi (front porch) of the building was heavily altered, concealing the original architecture of the mosque just behind it.
Great Mosque of Tuban		Tuban, East Java	1928	
Tiban Mosque		Turen, Malang	1976	Part of Pondok Pesantren Salafiyah Bihaaru Bahri 'Asali Fadlaailir Rahmah.
Al-Akbar Mosque		Surabaya, East Java	2000	
Cheng Ho Mosque of Surabaya		Surabaya	2002	
Muhammad Cheng Hoo Mosque		Pasuruan, East Java	2008	
Indrapuri Old Mosque		Indrapuri (5.4154°N 95.4466°E), Aceh	1607–1636	The mosque was built on top of a 12th-century Hindu temple. Renovation occurred in 1696 and later in 1879.
Baiturrahman Grand Mosque		Banda Aceh (5.5458°N 95.3181°E)	1881	One of the oldest mosques in Aceh, the building survived the 2004 tsunami.
Great Mosque of Singkil		Aceh Singkil	1909	Renovated close to the original architecture in 2005 after destruction by the 2004 tsunami.
Baiturrahim Mosque		Banda Aceh	1922	
Baitul Makmur Meulaboh Grand Mosque		West Aceh	1999	
Al-Osmani Mosque		Medan (3.7322°N 98.6761°E), North Sumatra	1872	First wooden construction in 1854, alteration began in 1870.
Grand Mosque of Medan		Medan	1906	
Jami Mosque of Air Tiris		Kampar Regency, Riau	1904	
An-Nur Great Mosque Pekanbaru		Pekanbaru, Riau	1968	
Al-Manan Mosque		Dumai, Riau	2002	
Grand Mosque of the Sultan of Riau		Penyengat Island (0.9294°S 104.4205°E, Riau Islands	1844	First built in the 19th century, major alternation started in 1831. Reputedly the first mosque in Indonesia which employs a dome. Employs Malay, Indo-Islamic, and Turkish architectural styles.
Raja Hamidah Great Mosque of Batam		Batam, Riau Islands	1999	
Great Mosque of Natuna		Natuna Regency, Riau Islands	2009	
Baitul Makmur Tanjung Uban Grand Mosque		Bintan Regency, Riau Islands	2012	
Tuo Kayu Jao Mosque		Solok Regency (1.0044°S 100.6287°E), West Sumatra	1567–1599	
Syekh Burhanuddin Grand Mosque		Padang Pariaman Regency (0.69°S 100.20°E), West Sumatra	1670	
60 Kurang Aso Mosque		South Solok Regency, West Sumatra	17th century	
Lima Kaum Mosque		Tanah Datar Regency, West Sumatra	1710	
Lubuak Bareh Mosque		Padang Pariaman Regency, West Sumatra	1727	
Bawan Tua Mosque		Agam Regency, West Sumatra	1800	
Grand Mosque of Ganting		Padang (0.9545°S 100.3694°E), West Sumatra	1805	Oldest mosque in Padang and one of the largest in the city.
Grand Mosque of Kubang Putih		Agam Regency, West Sumatra	1810	
Nurul Hikmah Sipisang Mosque		Agam Regency, West Sumatra	1818	
Bingkudu Mosque		Agam Regency	1823	
Ampang Gadang Old Mosque		Lima Puluh Kota Regency, West Sumatra	1837	
Tuo Koto Nan Ampek Mosque		Payakumbuh, West Sumatra	1840	
Muhammadan Mosque		Padang (0.9615°S 100.3642°E, West Sumatra	1843	
Kubang Grand Mosque		Lima Puluh Kota Regency, West Sumatra	1846	
Ampek Lingkuang Grand Mosque		Padang Pariaman Regency, West Sumatra	1850	
Jami Mosque of Taluak		Agam Regency (0.3279°S 100.3882°E), West Sumatra	1860	
Teluk Bayur Grand Mosque		Padang, West Sumatra	1888	
Nurul Islam Great Mosque		Sawahlunto (0.6860°S 100.7777°E), West Sumatra	1894	Initially built as a power station. Turned into a mosque in 1952.
Lubuk Bauk Mosque		Padang Panjang, West Sumatra	1896	
Badano Grand Mosque		Pariaman, West Sumatra	19th century	
Saadah Mosque		Tanah Datar Regency, West Sumatra	1910	
Grand Mosque of Balai Gadang Mungo		Limapuluh Koto Regency, West Sumatra	1914	
Baiturrahman Mosque of Sungayang		Tanah Datar Regency	1916	
Jami Mosque of Sungai Jambu		Tanah Datar Regency	1918	
Rao Rao Mosque		Tanah Datar Regency	1918	
Nurul Huda Mosque		Sawahlunto, West Sumatra	1921	
Al-Imam Koto Baru Mosque		Pesisir Selatan Regency, West Sumatra	1924	
Mutaqaddimin Mosque		Limapuluh Koto Regency, West Sumatra	1930	
Nurul Iman Mosque of Koto Gadang		Agam Regency, West Sumatra	1932	
Grand Mosque of Nanggalo		Padang, West Sumatra	1933	
Koto Baru Grand Mosque		South Solok Regency, West Sumatra	1933	
Syekh Sampu Mosque		Solok Selatan Regency, West Sumatra	1936	
Nurul Amin Mosque of Pagaruyung		Tanah Datar Regency	1992	
Bayur Grand Mosque		Agam Regency	1999	
Surau Baitul Jalil		Bukittinggi, West Sumatra	2004	
Nurul Iman Mosque		Padang	2007	
Grand Mosque of Andalas		Padang	2012	
Al-Karim Grand Mosque		Agam Regency, West Sumatra	2012	
Grand Mosque of West Sumatra		Padang	2014	
Great Mosque of Pondok Tinggi		Sungai Penuh, Jambi	1874	
Ikhsaniyyah Mosque		Jambi	1880	
Akbar At-Taqwa Grand Mosque		Bengkulu	1989	
Grand Mosque of Tua Tunu		Pangkalpinang, Bangka Belitung	2006	
Great Mosque of Palembang		Palembang (2.987833°S 104.759796°E), South Sumatra	1893	Established in 1748; major renovations in 1893, 1916, the 1950s, and the 1970s; major expansion in the 1990s. The royal mosque of Palembang Sultanate.
Cheng Ho Mosque		Palembang	2006	
Al-Furqon Grand Mosque of Bandar Lampung		Bandar Lampung	1961	
Al-Bakrie Grand Mosque		Bandar Lampung	2025	
Baitul Mukhlisin Islamic Center Mosque		West Lampung Regency	2010	
Floating Mosque of Al-Aminah		Pesawaran Regency, Lampung	2012	
Jami Mosque of Sintang		Sintang Regency (0.08°N 111.49°E), West Kalimantan	1672	
Jami Mosque of Sambas		Sambas, West Kalimantan	1702	
Jami Mosque of Pontianak		Pontianak (0.03°S 109.35°E), West Kalimantan	1821	Construction started in 1821. The first mosque of West Kalimantan and the largest in the province.
Jami Mosque of Landak		Landak Regency, West Kalimantan	1895	
Nurul Huda Mosque of Sungai Jawi		Ketapang Regency, West Kalimantan	1932	
Babul Chair Mosque		Ketapang Regency	1953	
Kyai Gede Mosque		West Kotawaringin Regency (2.4858°S 111.4443°E), Central Kalimantan	1675	
Shiratal Mustaqiem Mosque		Samarinda, East Kalimantan	1881	
Imanuddin Grand Mosque		Berau Regency, East Kalimantan	19th century	
Aji Amir Hasanuddin Jami Mosque		Tenggarong, East Kalimantan	1930	
Darussalam Grand Mosque		Samarinda	1967	
Baitul Muttaqien Mosque		Samarinda	2008	
Madinatul Iman Mosque		Balikpapan, East Kalimantan	2017	
National Mosque of Nusantara Capital City		Nusantara	2026	
Sultan Suriansyah Mosque		Banjarmasin (3.2943°S 114.5761°E), South Kalimantan	1526	Established in the 16th century, it is the oldest mosque in Borneo based on its year of establishment. The form of the building has been altered in the 18th century.
Heritage Mosque of Banua Lawas		Banua Lawas (2.2803°S 115.2119°E), South Kalimantan	1625	
Jami Mosque of Banjarmasin		Banjarmasin, South Kalimantan	1777	
Jami Syekh Abdul Hamid Abulung Mosque		Sungai Batang, Banjar, South Kalimantan	18th century	
Jami Mosque of Sungai Banar		Amuntai, Hulu Sungai Utara Regency, South Kalimantan	1804	
Holy Mosque of Banua Halat		Tapin Regency, South Kalimantan	1840	
Great Mosque of Al-Karomah		Martapura, South Kalimantan	1863	
Ba'angkat Mosque		South Hulu Sungai Regency, South Kalimantan	1908	
Kanas Mosque		Alalak, Banjarmasin, South Kalimantan	1938	
Kelayan Muhammadiyah Mosque		Banjarmasin	1938	
Great Mosque of Riyadusshalihin		Hulu Sungai Tengah Regency, South Kalimantan	1962	
Grand Mosque of Sabilal Muhtadin		Banjarmasin, South Kalimantan	1974	
Syuhada Great Mosque		Mamuju, West Sulawesi	2011	
Darussalam Great Mosque		Palu, Central Sulawesi	1978	
Floating Mosque of Palu		Palu, Central Sulawesi	2011	Hit by the 2018 Sulawesi earthquake and tsunami.
Katangka Mosque		Gowa, South Sulawesi	1603	
Palopo Old Mosque		Palopo (2.994113°S 120.195301°E), South Sulawesi	1604	
Nurul Hilal Dato Tiro Mosque		Bulukumba, South Sulawesi	1605	
Nur Mosque of Balangnipa		Sinjai Regency, South Sulawesi	1660	
Grand Mosque of Makassar		Makassar, South Sulawesi	1949	
Al-Markaz Al-Islami Mosque		Makassar, South Sulawesi	1996	
Amirul Mukminin Mosque		Makassar, South Sulawesi	2012	
99 Domes Mosque		Makassar, South Sulawesi	2023	
Great Mosque of Wolio		Baubau, Southeast Sulawesi	1712	
Al-Alam Mosque		Kendari, Southeast Sulawesi	2018	
Nurul Huda Mosque of Gelgel		Klungkung, Bali	late 14th-16th century	Renovated
Holy Old Mosque of Singaraja		Singaraja, Bali	1654	Renovated
Baiturrahim Jami Mosques of Bungaya Kangin		Bungaya Kangin, Bebandem, Karangasem Regency, Bali	1768	Renovated
Great Mosque of Jami Singaraja		Singaraja, Bali	1830	Complited in 1860, renovated
Sudirman Grand Mosque		Denpasar, Bali	1974	
Bayan Beleq Mosque		Bayan, West Nusa Tenggara	1634	
Nurul Huda Great Mosque of Sumbawa		Sumbawa Regency, West Nusa Tenggara	1648	Renovated
Darussalam Great Mosque		Taliwang, West Sumbawa, West Nusa Tenggara	2010	
Wapauwe Old Mosque		Central Maluku	1414	Myth surrounds the year of establishment. The original structure and material has been replaced several times to maintain the mosque, but the architecture is kept similar.
Sultan of Ternate Mosque		Ternate (0.7989°N 127.3847°E), North Maluku	1606	The construction of the mosque was initiated by the Sultanate of Ternate.
Patimburak Old Mosque		Fakfak, West Papua	1870	
Al-Aqsha Mosque of Merauke		Merauke, South Papua	1980	
Nurul Amin Mosque		Jayapura, Papua	1997	
Al-Baitul Amien Mosque		Jember, East Java	1976	

== Largest mosques ==
Below is a list of large mosques of Indonesia. To be listed here, the building capacity has to accommodate at least 15,000 people.

Name	Images	Building capacity	Area	Location	Year
Istiqlal Mosque		200,000	10,000 m^{2} (building); 93,200 m^{2}	Jakarta 6.1702°S 106.8314°E	1978
Al Jabbar Grand Mosque		60,000	25,997 m^{2} (lot size)	Bandung, West Java	2022
Al-Akbar Mosque		59,000	18,800 m^{2} (building)	Surabaya, East Java 7.3364°S 112.7149°E	2000
At-Tin Mosque		25,850	10,413 m^{2} (building); 70,000 m^{2} (lot size)	Jakarta	1997
Jakarta Islamic Center		20,680	14,625 m^{2} (building); 109,000 m^{2} (lot size)	Jakarta	1972
Dian Al-Mahri Mosque		20,000	8,000 m^{2} (building); 50,000 m^{2} (lot size)	Depok, West Java 6.384098°S 106.772003°E	2006
Grand Mosque of West Sumatra		20,000	18,000 m^{2} (building); 40,000 m^{2} (lot size)	Padang, West Sumatra 0.92380°S 100.3623°E	2014
Raja Hamidah Great Mosque of Batam		18,500	5,430 m^{2} (building); 75,000 m^{2} (lot size)	Batam, Riau Islands	1999
Al-Azhom Grand Mosque		15,000	5,766 m^{2} (building); 20,810 m^{2} (lot size)	Tangerang, Banten	2003
Great Mosque of Central Java		15,000	7,669 m^{2} (building); 10,000 m^{2} (lot size)	Semarang, Central Java 6.9837°S 110.4456°E	2006
Grand Mosque of Sabilal Muhtadin		15,000	5,250 m^{2} (building)	Banjarmasin, South Kalimantan 3.3190°S 114.5913°E	1974

== See also ==
- Mosque architecture in Indonesia
- List of largest mosques

== Selected bibliography ==
- Masjid-masjid Bersejarah dan Ternama Indonesia: Direktori [Indonesian Historic and Famous Mosques: Directory] (in Indonesian). Complited by Sekretariat Wakil Presiden RI, Departemen Agama RI, Dewan Masjid Indonesia. South Jakarta: Permata Communications. 2005. ISBN 979-250-050-2.
- Santosa, Revianto Budi; et al. (2025). Ensiklopedia Arsitektur Islam Indonesia. Edisi: Masjid Bersejarah [Encyclopedia of Indonesian Islamic Architecture. Edition: Historic Mosques] (in Indonesian). Jakarta: Kementerian Agama RI. ISBN 978-602-293-252-9.
- Wiryomartono, Bagoes (2023). Historical Mosques in Indonesia and Malaysia World: Roots, Transformations, and Developments (pdf). Singapore: Springer. ISBN 978-981-99-3805-6.
- Zein, Abdul Baqir (1999). Dendi Irfan (ed.). Masjid-Masjid Bersejarah di Indonesia [Historic Mosques in Indonesia] (in Indonesian). Jakarta: Gema Insani Press. ISBN 979-561-567-X.
