= Baitul Makmur Tanjung Uban Grand Mosque =

Mosque in Bintan, Riau Islands, Indonesia

- Masjid Raya Baitul Makmur Tanjung Uban
- Location within Indonesia

Religion
- Affiliation: Islam
- Branch/tradition: Sunni

Location
- Location: Bintan, Riau Islands, Indonesia
- Interactive map of Baitul Makmur Tanjung Uban Grand Mosque
- Coordinates: 1°04′14.0″N 104°13′41.5″E

Architecture
- Type: Mosque
- Groundbreaking: 2008
- Completed: 2012

Specifications
- Capacity: 3,000 worshipers
- Dome: 5
- Dome dia. (outer): 9 meters (main dome)

The Baitul Makmur Tanjung Uban Grand Mosque (Indonesian: Masjid Raya Baitul Makmur Tanjung Uban) is the largest mosque in Bintan Island and is located in Simpang Makam Pahlawan, Tanjung Uban, Riau Islands Province, Indonesia. The whole 1.6 hectares of area of Baitul Makmur Tanjung Uban Grand Mosque is waqf (endowment) of the deceased King Daud. The construction started in 2008, and it began to be used in 2012 even though the development process has not been fully completed. The mosque is expected to accommodate up to 3,000 pilgrims in the main hall, as well as 6,000 pilgrims with mosque courtyards. It has five domes, with a main dome and four small domes that surround it. This dome is made of mild steel and is rustproof. The main dome has a diameter of 9 meters, which supposedly makes this dome cost up to 600 million rupiah. The dome was decorated with colorful ornaments that symbolize the diversity of tribes and nations of Muslims.

== See also ==
- Islam in Indonesia
- List of mosques in Indonesia
