= An-Nawier Mosque =

Mosque in Jakarta, Indonesia

- Masjid An-Nawier
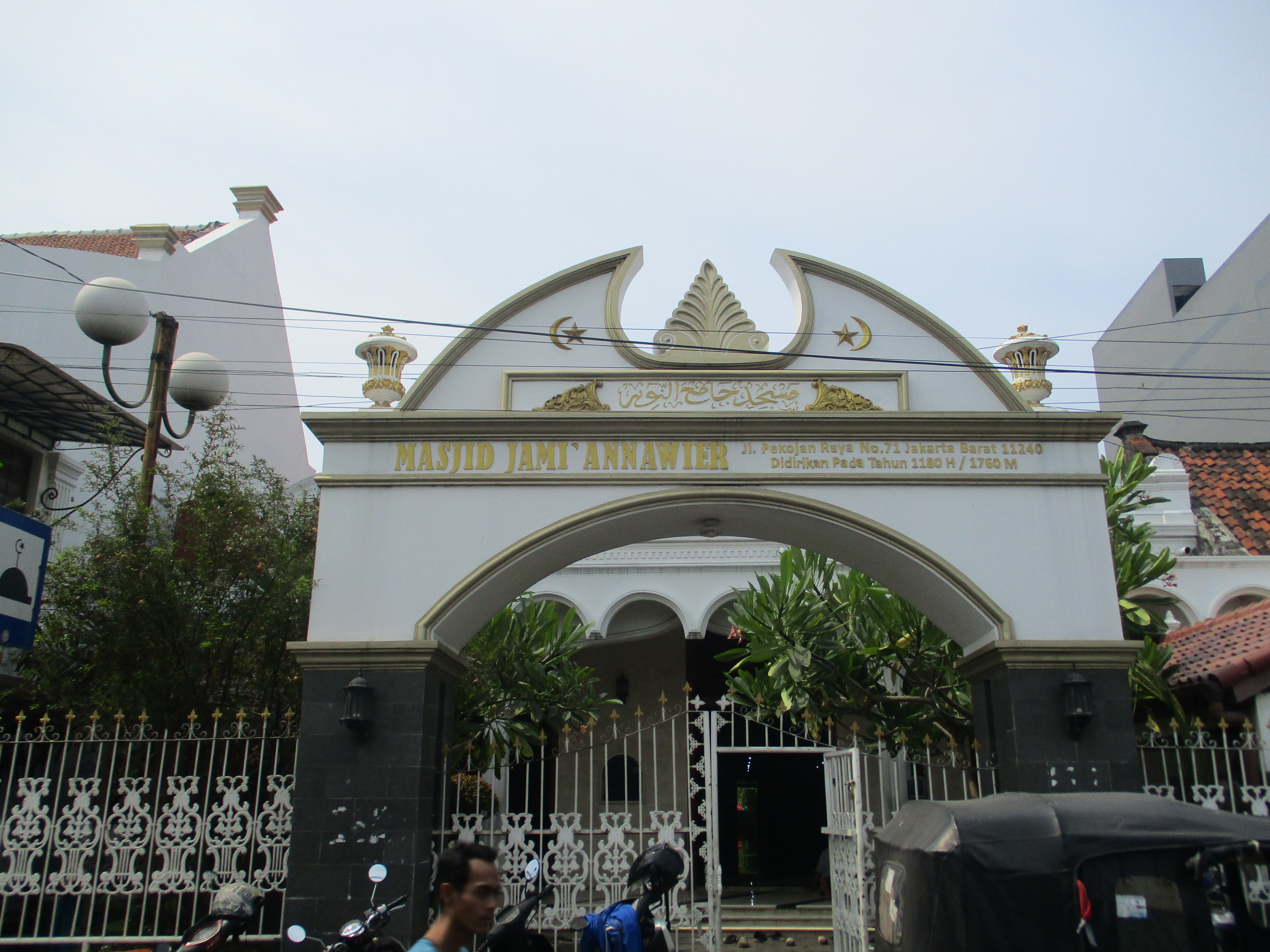

- Location within Indonesia

Religion
- Affiliation: Islam
- Branch/tradition: Sunni
- Region: Tambora

Location
- Location: Jakarta
- Country: Indonesia
- Interactive map of An-Nawier Mosque
- Coordinates: 6.141518°S 106.804522°E

Architecture
- Completed: 1760

Specifications
- Capacity: 1000
- Interior area: 1,500 square meters

An-Nawier Mosque (Indonesian: Masjid An-Nawier) is one of the oldest mosques in Jakarta, Indonesia. It is located in Pekojan, Tambora, a district of Jakarta. The mosque is a symbol of Arab civilization in Jakarta. The mosque's large and ancient architecture stands majestically in one densely populated settlement in West Jakarta. The settlement was once a region whose majority population is descended from Arabs, Yemen and India. Although the number of Arabs is now no longer prominent, but traces can still be found until now in Pekojan.

== History ==
This mosque was formerly built by Sayid Abdullah bin Huseim Alaydrius who also came from Hadramaut (Yemen) in 1760. It is alleged that the builder of the mosque was the descendant of the Islamic prophet Muhammad. The mosque has undergone several renovations and maintenance. Of the several times, the renovation in 1800s was the most physically changing mosque. Expansion of the mosque in 1850 was conducted by Commander Dahlan from Banten. In 1897 land was donated for the expansion of the mosque.

The prayer building of the mosque is L-shaped. The mosque has a land area of about 2,000 square meters and a building area of 1,500 square meters, and can accommodate 1,000 pilgrims. The mosque has three entrances in north, south and eastern side. There are 33 poles in the mosque. The mosque has a pulpit, which was donated in 1871 by the Sultan of Pontianak. The tower of the mosque resembles a lighthouse.

== See also ==
- Islam in Indonesia
- List of mosques in Indonesia
