= Akbar At-Taqwa Grand Mosque =

Mosque in Bengkulu, Indonesia

- Masjid Raya Akbar At-Taqwa
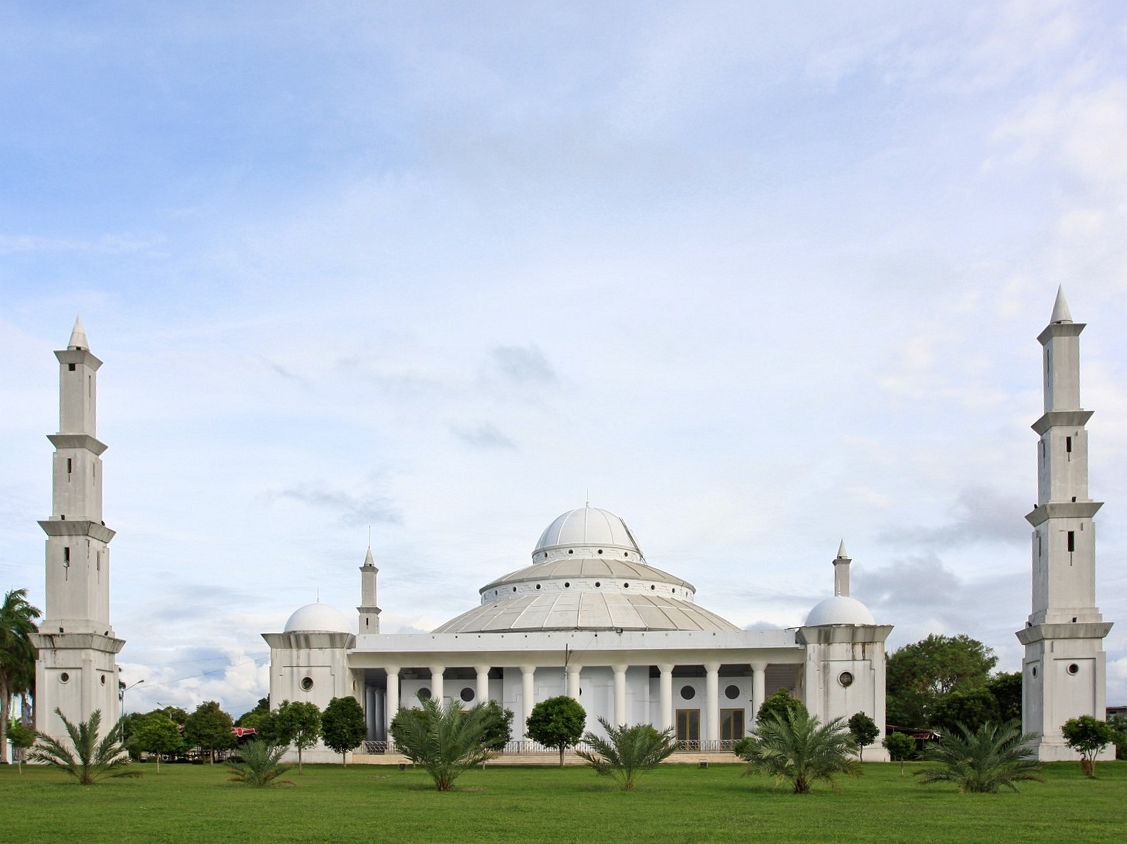

- Location within Indonesia

Religion
- Affiliation: Islam
- Branch/tradition: Sunni

Location
- Location: Bengkulu City, Bengkulu Province, Indonesia
- Coordinates: 3°48′00″S 102°15′32″E

Architecture
- Type: Mosque
- Groundbreaking: 1988
- Completed: 1989

Akbar At-Taqwa Grand Mosque is a mosque located in Bengkulu City, Bengkulu Province, Indonesia. It serves as the main mosque in the city. The groundbreaking of the mosque began in 1988, and the construction finished in 1989. The mosque resembles the colonial-era palace building as seen from the park and is spacious with the arrangement of a garden in the courtyard and a small square in the palace yard.

== See also ==
- Islam in Indonesia
- List of mosques in Indonesia
