= Bawan Tua Mosque =

Mosque in Agam, West Sumatra, Indonesia

Bawan Tua Mosque Masjid Bawan Tuo
- Location within Sumatra Location within Indonesia

Religion
- Affiliation: Islam
- Branch/tradition: Sunni
- Leadership: Waqf

Location
- Location: Nagari Bawan, Ampek Nagari, Agam Regency, West Sumatra, Indonesia
- Interactive map of Bawan Tua Mosque; Masjid Bawan Tuo
- Coordinates: 0.20107998°S 100.01749307°E

Architecture
- Type: Mosque
- Groundbreaking: 1800

Specifications
- Length: 40 m
- Width: 40 m

Bawan Tuo Mosque, also known as Babussalam Mosque, is one of the oldest mosques in Indonesia, located in Nagari Bawan, Ampek Nagari Subdistrict, Agam Regency, West Sumatra. The mosque, which was first established in 1800, is a relic of Rajo Kaciak, in the territory of Lambah Bawan Kingdom, the last area in Minangkabau which was controlled by the Dutch East India Company. The mosque is 40 x 40 square meters and stands on one hectare of waqf (endowed) land.

== History ==
The construction of this mosque was initiated by Rajo Kacik in 1800. At first the location of the mosque was a muddy ground area, but then because of the increasing danger of collapse, in 1942 it was rebuilt not far from the original location, which is the location where the mosque stands today.

== See also ==
- Islam in Indonesia
- List of mosques in Indonesia
