= Nurul Iman Mosque of Koto Gadang =

Mosque in Agam, West Sumatra, Indonesia

- Masjid Nurul Iman Koto Gadang
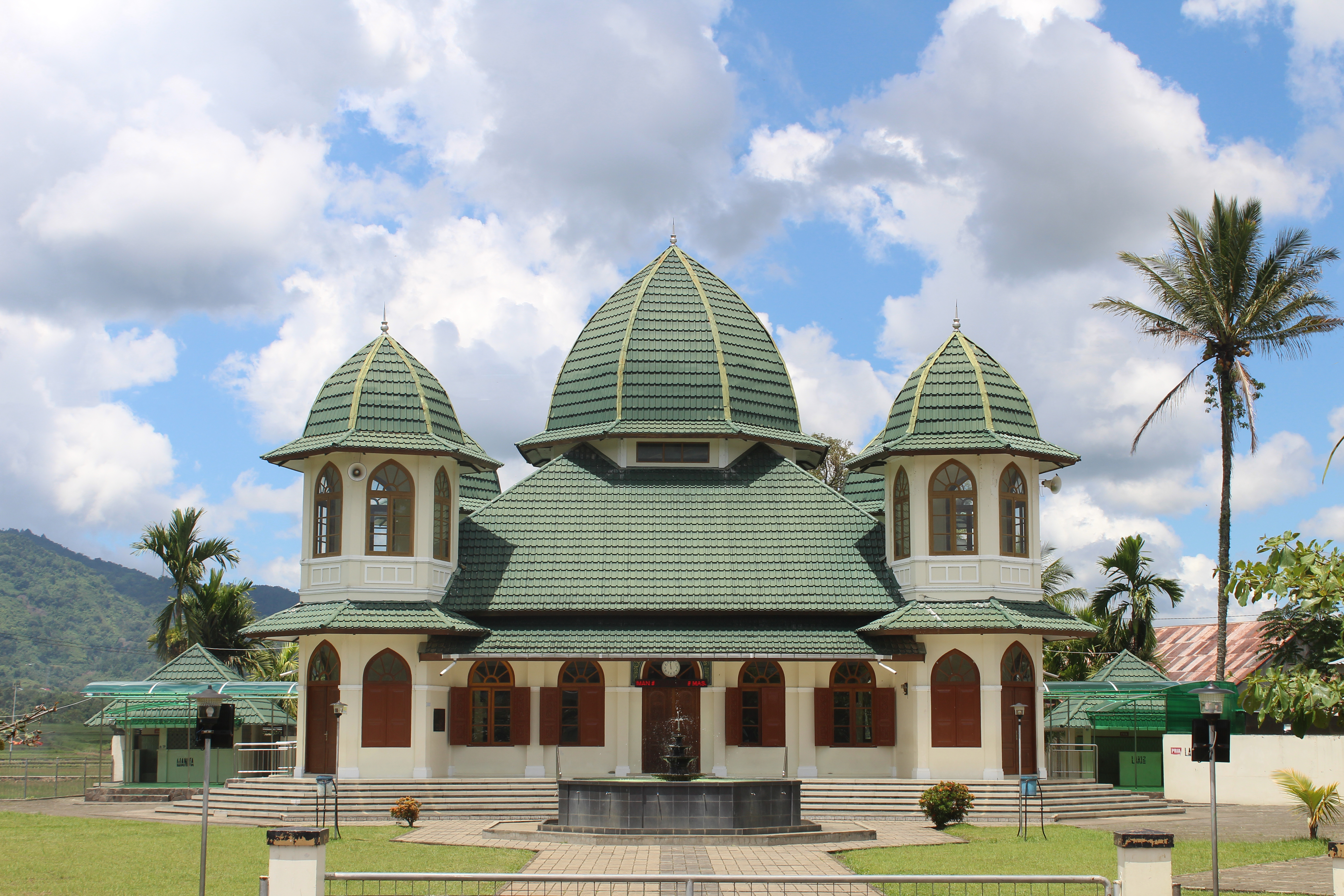

- Location within Indonesia

Religion
- Affiliation: Islam
- Branch/tradition: Sunni

Location
- Location: Agam, West Sumatra, Indonesia
- Interactive map of Nurul Iman Mosque of Koto Gadang
- Coordinates: 0°19′06.6″S 100°21′26.3″E

Architecture
- Architect: Yazid Rajo Mangkuto
- Type: Mosque
- Established: 1856 (first building); 1932 (second building)
- Destroyed: 28 June 1926; 6 March 2007

Nurul Iman Mosque of Koto Gadang or Tapi Koto Gadang Mosque is one of the oldest mosques in Indonesia, located in Koto Gadang Nagari, Agam Regency, West Sumatra. This mosque is the largest mosque in Koto Gadang area.

Since its foundation in 1856, the mosque has undergone some form of transformation and several repairs. The earliest mosque, known as the Old Jamik Mosque, was typical of Minangkabau style with cone-shaped tapered roofs. However, the mosque was heavily damaged during the Padang Panjang earthquake in 1926.

A few months after the earthquake, the new mosque was soon built by the initiative of Yahya Datuk Kayo, who was a member of the Volksraad representing Minangkabau, and inaugurated the renewed mosque on February 5, 1932. Designed by Yazid Rajo Mangkuto, the shape of the new mosque building was totally changed from its predecessor. However, the building of the mosque was destroyed again by the earthquake in March 2007. Since then the mosque was restored with the form similar to the pre-earthquake one.

== Old building ==
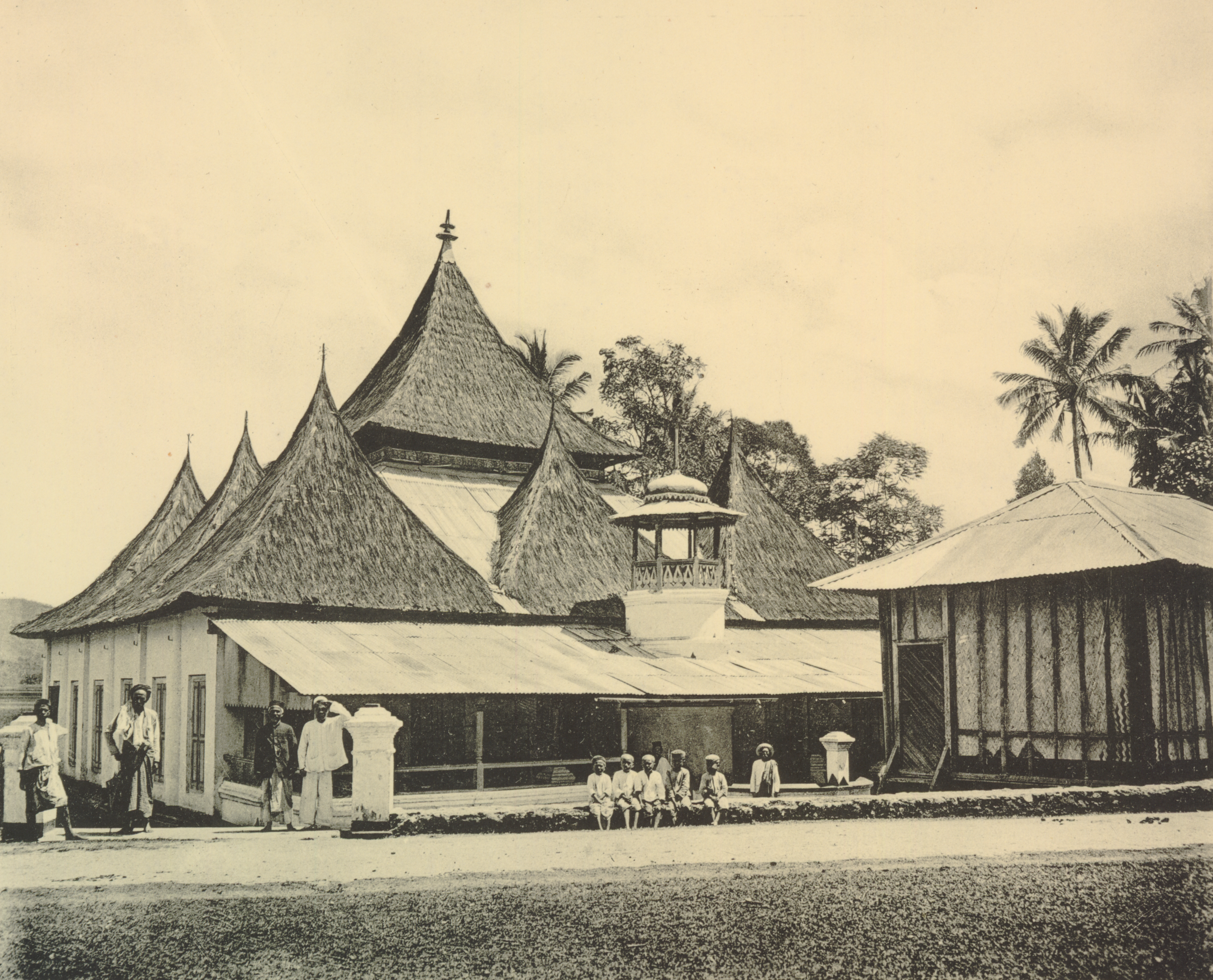
Old Nurul Iman Mosque before dismantling, circa 1910.

The Old Jamik Mosque was built in 1856. Made of wood, the Minangkabau architectural style building was measured 20 × 20 meters. There was also a tower on the roof. The roof had no dome, but consisted of several gonjong roof, a Minangkabau style roof, made of fibers. One gonjong in the middle was flanked by eight smaller gonjong around him.

On June 28, 1926, a magnitude 7.6 earthquake hit Padangpanjang and caused damage to the walls of the mosque. Some of the walls collapsed, and the parts that remained had cracks in them. Danger ultimately led to the dismantling of the mosque's building. In a meeting attended by a number of local community leaders on July 18, 1926, it was agreed to immediately establish a new mosque by forming a committee headed by Yahya Datuk Kayo.

== See also ==
- List of mosques in Indonesia
