= Sultan Suriansyah Mosque =

Mosque in Banjarmasin, South Kalimantan, Indonesia

- Masjid Sultan Suriansyah
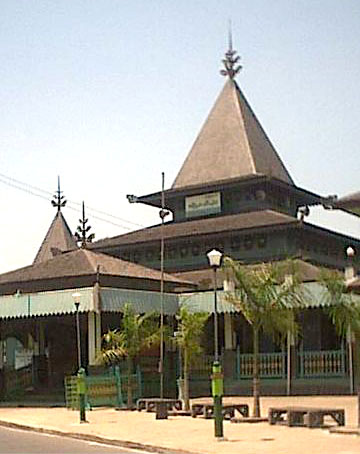

Religion
- Affiliation: Islam
- Branch/tradition: Sunni

Location
- Location: Banjarmasin, South Kalimantan, Indonesia
- Interactive map of Sultan Suriansyah Mosque
- Coordinates: 3.2943°S 114.5762°E

Architecture
- Type: mosque
- Completed: 1526

The Sultan Suriansyah Mosque (Indonesian: Masjid Sultan Suriansyah) is the oldest mosque in South Kalimantan. Built in 1526 during the reign of Sultan Suriansyah, the first Banjar King to convert to Islam. The mosque is located in the village of Kuin Utara, in Banjarmasin.

The mosque is a stilt house, made out of ironwood and with a three-story roof. The mihrab has its own roof, separate from the main building. The mosque's architectural style, particularly the layered roof, was taken from the Great Mosque of Demak, which took influence from the architecture of the Hindu-Buddhist civilizations of Java and Bali.

The mosque was renovated twice, first in 1978 and again in 1999. It was named a cultural heritage site on May 23, 2008.

== See also ==
- List of mosques in Indonesia
- Indonesian architecture
