= Baitul Mukhlisin Islamic Center Mosque =

Mosque in West Lampung, Lampung, Indonesia

Baitul Mukhlisin Islamic Center Mosque Masjid Islamic Center Baitul Mukhlisin

Religion
- Affiliation: Islam
- Branch/tradition: Sunni

Location
- Location: Liwa, West Lampung Regency, Lampung, Indonesia
- Interactive map of Baitul Mukhlisin Islamic Center Mosque; Masjid Islamic Center Baitul Mukhlisin
- Coordinates: 5°01′01″S 104°06′56″E

Architecture
- Type: Mosque
- Groundbreaking: 2009
- Completed: 2010

The Baitul Mukhlisin Islamic Center Mosque (Indonesian: Masjid Islamic Center Baitul Mukhlisin) is a mosque located in Liwa, West Lampung Regency, Lampung, Indonesia. The mosque was constructed in 2009 and finished in 2010. It is known as Bintang Emas (Gold Star) Mosque as the star on top of the dome is coated in gold color. Most of the buildings use architecture with Arabic ornaments. Building materials are selected from Lampung and andesite marble stones that enhance space and minimize maintenance costs.

== See also ==
- Islam in Indonesia
- List of mosques in Indonesia
