= Grand Mosque of Makassar =

Mosque in Makassar, South Sulawesi, Indonesia

Grand Mosque of Makassar Masjid Raya Makassar
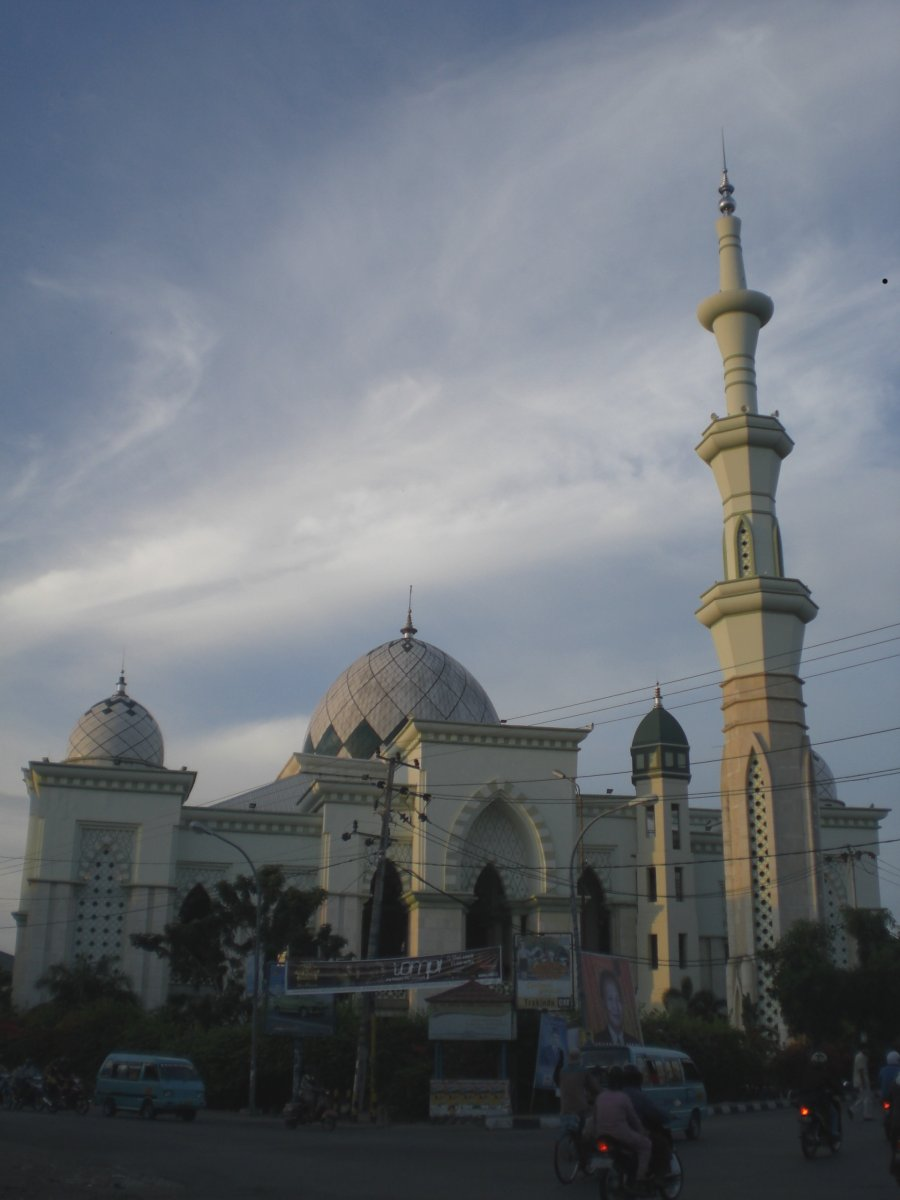

Religion
- Affiliation: Islam
- Branch/tradition: Sunni

Location
- Location: Makassar, South Sulawesi, Indonesia
- Interactive map of Grand Mosque of Makassar; Masjid Raya Makassar
- Coordinates: 5°07′50″S 119°25′11″E

Architecture
- Architect: Muhammad Soebardjo (former building)
- Type: Mosque
- Style: Islamic
- Groundbreaking: 1948
- Completed: 1949

Specifications
- Capacity: 10,000 pilgrims
- Minaret: 2
- Minaret height: 66.66

Grand Mosque of Makassar (Indonesian: Masjid Raya Makassar) is a mosque located in Makassar, Indonesia, and the main mosque of South Sulawesi Province. The construction begun in 1948 and completed in 1949. Since then the mosque underwent a renovation from 1999 to 2005. The mosque can accommodate up to 10,000 worshipers, making it one of the largest mosques in Southeast Asia.

This two-storey mosque in Bulusaraung street uses about 80 percent of building materials from local raw materials, and has two minarets as high as 66.66 meters, and other adjacent facilities such as library and the office of the Indonesian Ulema Council (MUI) South Sulawesi chapter.

== History ==
It was built on Exelsior Makassar soccer field with an area of 13,912 square meters, granted for the construction of the mosque. The earliest form of the building was designed by an architect Muhammad Soebardjo after winning a contest held by the mosque construction committee, and built on May 25, 1949. The construction cost reached 1.2 million rupiah after the inauguration, and it was initiated by K.H. Ahmad Bone, a scholar from Bone Regency in 1947 by appointing K.H. Muchtar Lutfi as the chairman of the construction committee.

The mosque is regarded as a pride of Makassar and became the first venue for Musabaqah Tilawatil Quran (MTQ) festival, a Qur'an recitation contest, in the year 1955. Sukarno, the first President of Indonesia, once stopped by and performed Friday prayers at the mosque in 1957. Former President Soeharto also visited and conducted a Friday prayer at the mosque in 1967.

The Grand Mosque of Makassar was completely overhauled from its original form in February 1999. At the time when then vice-president Jusuf Kalla raised the idea of massive renovation of the mosque, there was a concern regarding the possible construction of a plaza nearby, turning the mosque into a commercial center. However, such concerns were allayed along with the development and progress of the renovations since the groundbreaking by then governor of South Sulawesi Zainal Basri Palaguna on October 9, 1999.

== See also ==
- List of largest mosques
- List of mosques in Indonesia
