= Al-Markaz Al-Islami Mosque =

Mosque in Makassar, South Sulawesi, Indonesia

Al-Markaz Al-Islami General Yusuf Mosque Masjid Al-Markaz Al-Islami Jenderal Yusuf
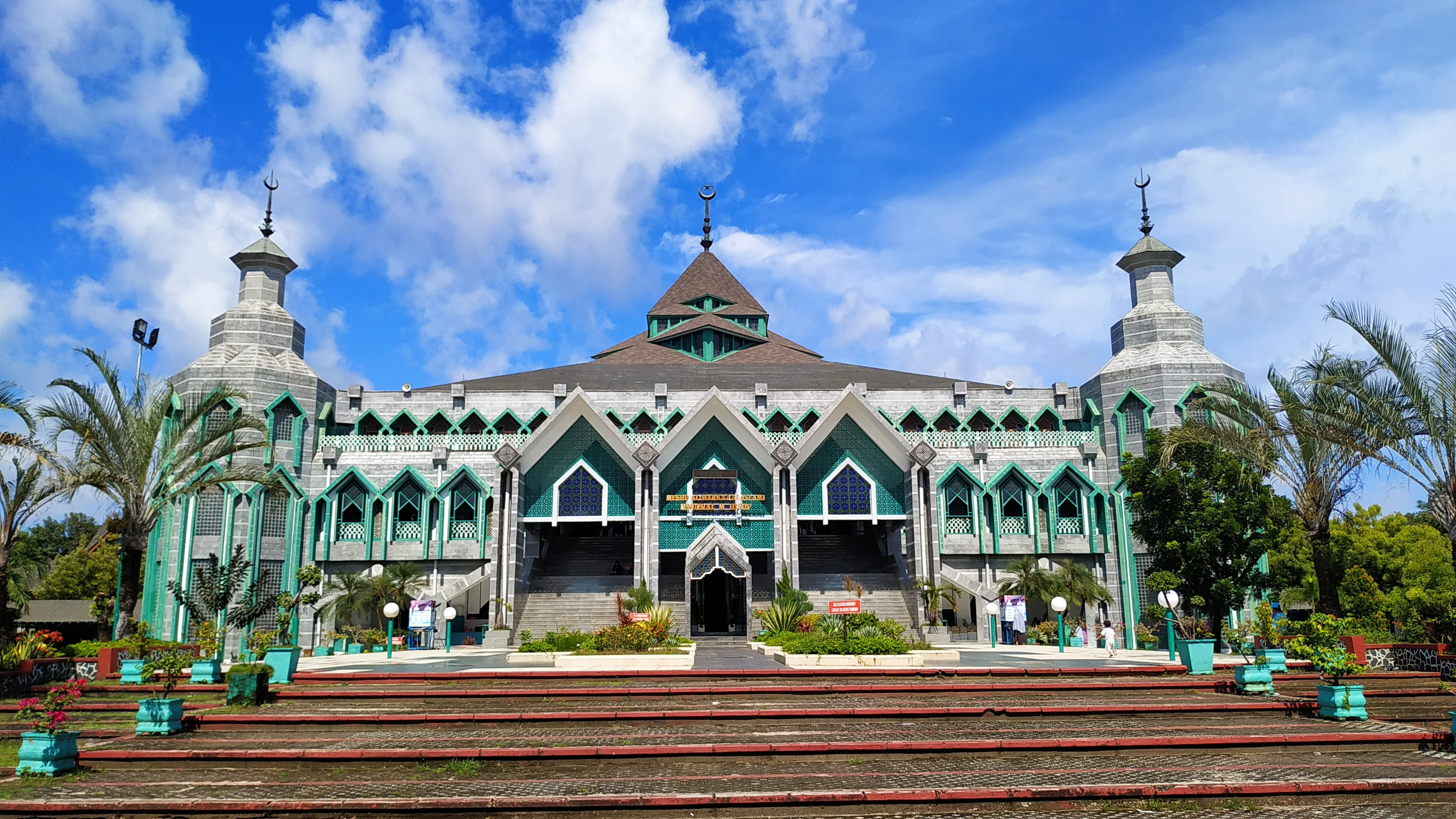

Religion
- Affiliation: Islam
- Branch/tradition: Sunni

Location
- Location: Makassar, South Sulawesi, Indonesia
- Interactive map of Al-Markaz Al-Islami General Yusuf Mosque; Masjid Al-Markaz Al-Islami Jenderal Yusuf
- Coordinates: 5.1299887°S 119.42632320000001°E

Architecture
- Type: Mosque
- Groundbreaking: May 8, 1994
- Completed: January 12, 1996
- Capacity: 10,000

Al-Markaz Al-Islami Mosque (Indonesian: Masjid Al-Markaz Al-Islami) is a mosque located in Makassar, South Sulawesi, Indonesia. The construction begun in 1994 and the mosque was completed in 1996. With maximum capacity of 10,000 pilgrims, building area of 6,932 m^{2}, and site area of 10,000 m^{2}, it serves as one of the biggest centers of Islamic religious activity in Southeast Asia. The building has three floors and made of granite stones, and it faces Masjid Raya Makassar street.

== See also ==
- List of largest mosques
- List of mosques in Indonesia
