= Pondok Pesantren Bi Ba'a Fadlrah =

Madrasa in West Java, Indonesia

Pondok Pesantren Bi Ba’a Fadlrah
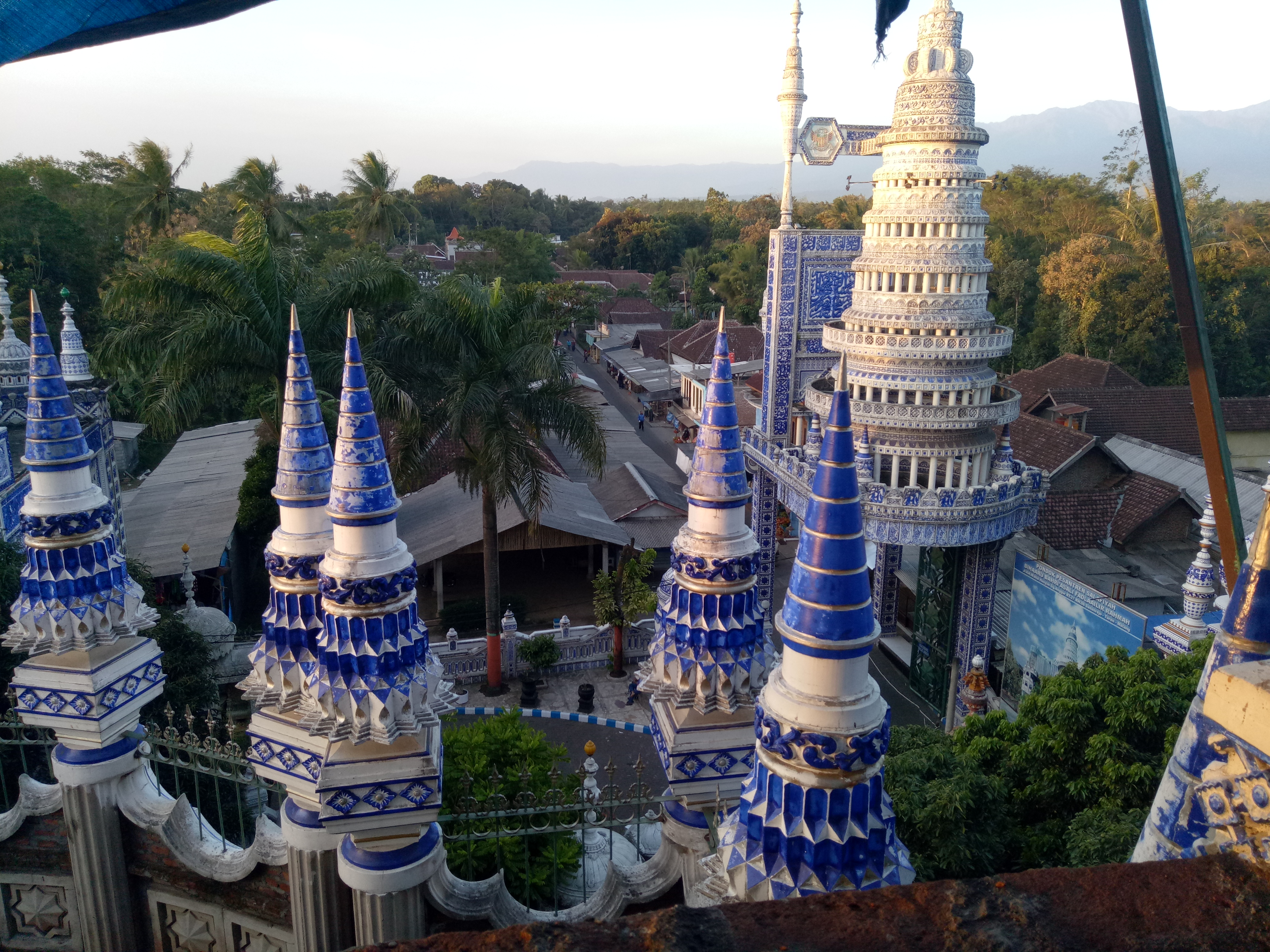

- Location within Indonesia
- Alternative names: Masjid Tiban

General information
- Status: Active
- Type: Madrasa and Pesantren
- Architectural style: Eclectic
- Location: Malang, Indonesia
- Coordinates: 8°09′04″S 112°42′47″E
- Year built: 1992
- Construction started: 1978
- Completed: 2008

The Pondok Pesantren Bi Ba’a Fadlrah (Bi Ba'a Fadlrah Islamic boarding school) is a 20th-century madrasa and pesantren located in the Turen village within Malang, East Java, Indonesia. It was founded by Islamic scholar Kyai Ahmad Bahru Mafdlaluddin in 1963, while the present building was built between 1978 and 2008. The campus of the madrasa contains a mosque known as the Sudden Mosque (Indonesian: Masjid Tiban; Jawi: مسجد تيبن)

== History ==
In 1963, Kyai Ahmad Bahru Mafdlaluddin, a local Muslim scholar and founder of the Salafi institution Salafiyah Bihaaru Bahri 'Asali Fadlaailir Rahmah, established a madrasa within a pondok pesantren (Indonesian term for "boarding school"), which was originally part of his house. To accommodate more students, construction on a new madrasa started in 1978. The new madrasa was built in phases, with students and teachers helping in the construction of the classrooms and dormitories. The main facade of the madrasa was completed in 1987, while the whole building was completed in 1992.

Further construction works to expand the madrasa started in 1998. Challenges arose due to insufficient funds as well as the fact that the building did not have a permit for construction. Once the permit had been obtained, construction continued through the end of the 20th century in 1999 and then the beginning of the 21st century in 2001. After some structural tests, the madrasa was completed in 2008.

The existence of the madrasa was relatively unknown to villagers in Turen, until a dome of the madrasa became visible through the landscape of trees surrounding the area. The madrasa is now a heritage site of Malang and is a popular tourist destination, renowned amongst locals for its bright colours and outstanding architecture which stand out from the urban settlement of Turen.

== Architecture ==
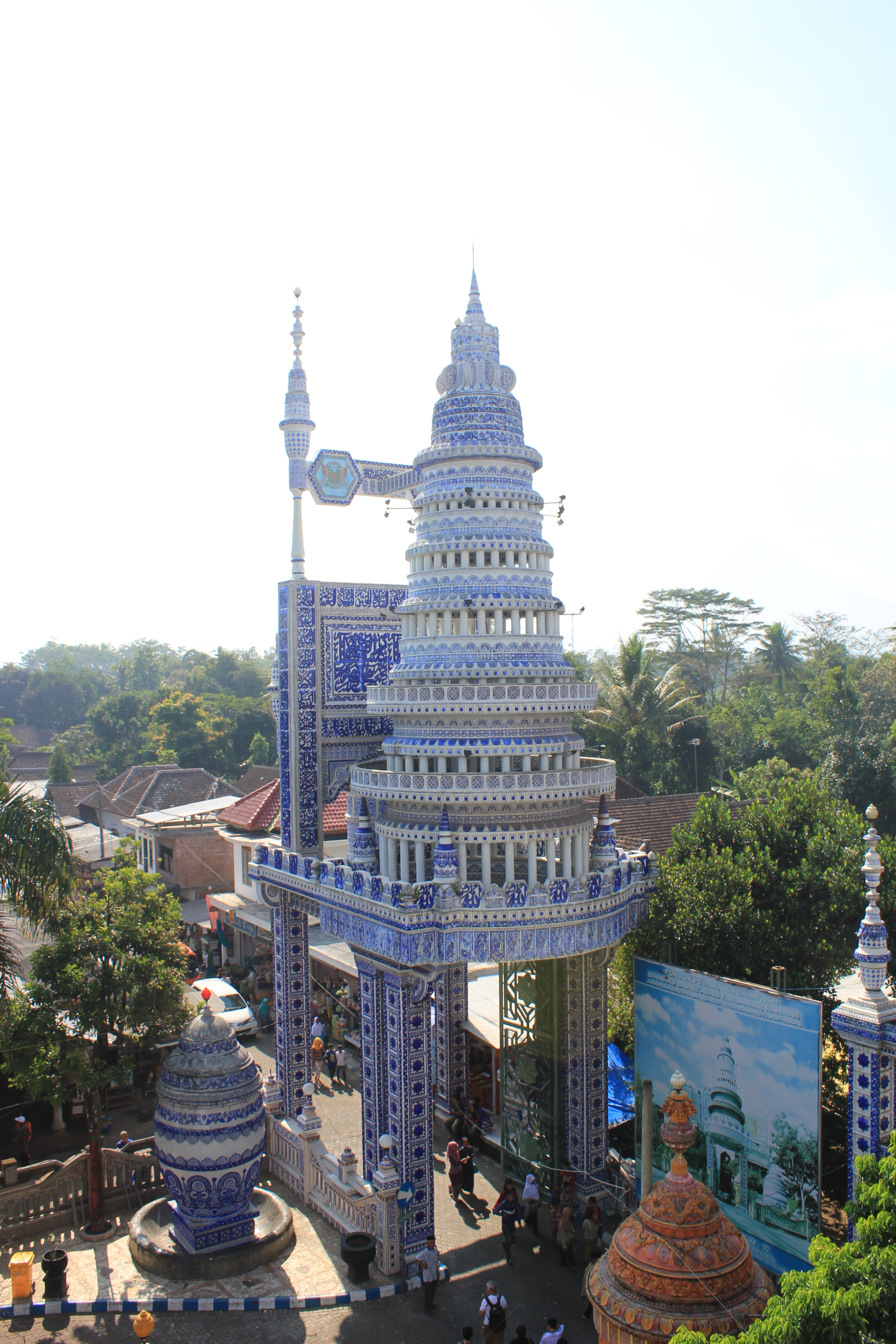
A spire of seven levels that sits atop an entrance to the madrasa.

The madrasa is built in an eclectic architectural style which combines elements of Javanese temple architecture with Indo-Saracenic and Islamic styles. The main building is ten stories high, with the ground level holding the Sudden Mosque, while the first four levels contain a musalla, prayer halls, as well as a space for student activities. The fifth and sixth levels are housing quarters for the mosque and madrasa committee. A pavilion occupies the uppermost level, while a marketplace run by students is situated on the seventh and eighth levels of the building.

The exterior of the madrasa is decorated with blue and white ceramic tiles, some of which take the form of floral patterns. The domes of the building are built on raised cylindrical platforms. Wooden beams with intricate carvings act as support structures for the mosque on the ground floor. A guardhouse stands in the centre of the entrance courtyard, itself a cylindrical structure topped with a dome and floral patterns adorning its exterior. Tall spires can be seen atop the gateways and entrances of the madrasa, inspired by the designs of Hindu temples.

A lush garden, rest area and canteen can be found behind the dormitories of the madrasa, near the parking lots. At the end of the garden is a pathway leading to the mausoleum of the founder, revered by some locals as a keramat even though such a practice is opposed by the Salafi movement that currently occupies the madrasa.

== Mythology ==
Due to not knowing about the existence of the madrasa until the emergence of a dome from the landscape of the forested area, some villagers believed that the madrasa was built in a day. Due to this myth which became widespread, the mosque is known as the Sudden Mosque, in reference to its "sudden" appearance. Another widespread myth is that a group of soldiers from the jinn built the mosque, which was disproved by the mosque committee.

== See also ==
- Islam in Indonesia
- List of mosques in Indonesia
- Nur al-Din Madrasa
