= Andalas Grand Mosque =

Mosque in Padang, West Sumatra, Indonesia

Coordinates: 0.94047°S 100.382°E

Andalas Grand Mosque Masjid Raya Andalas
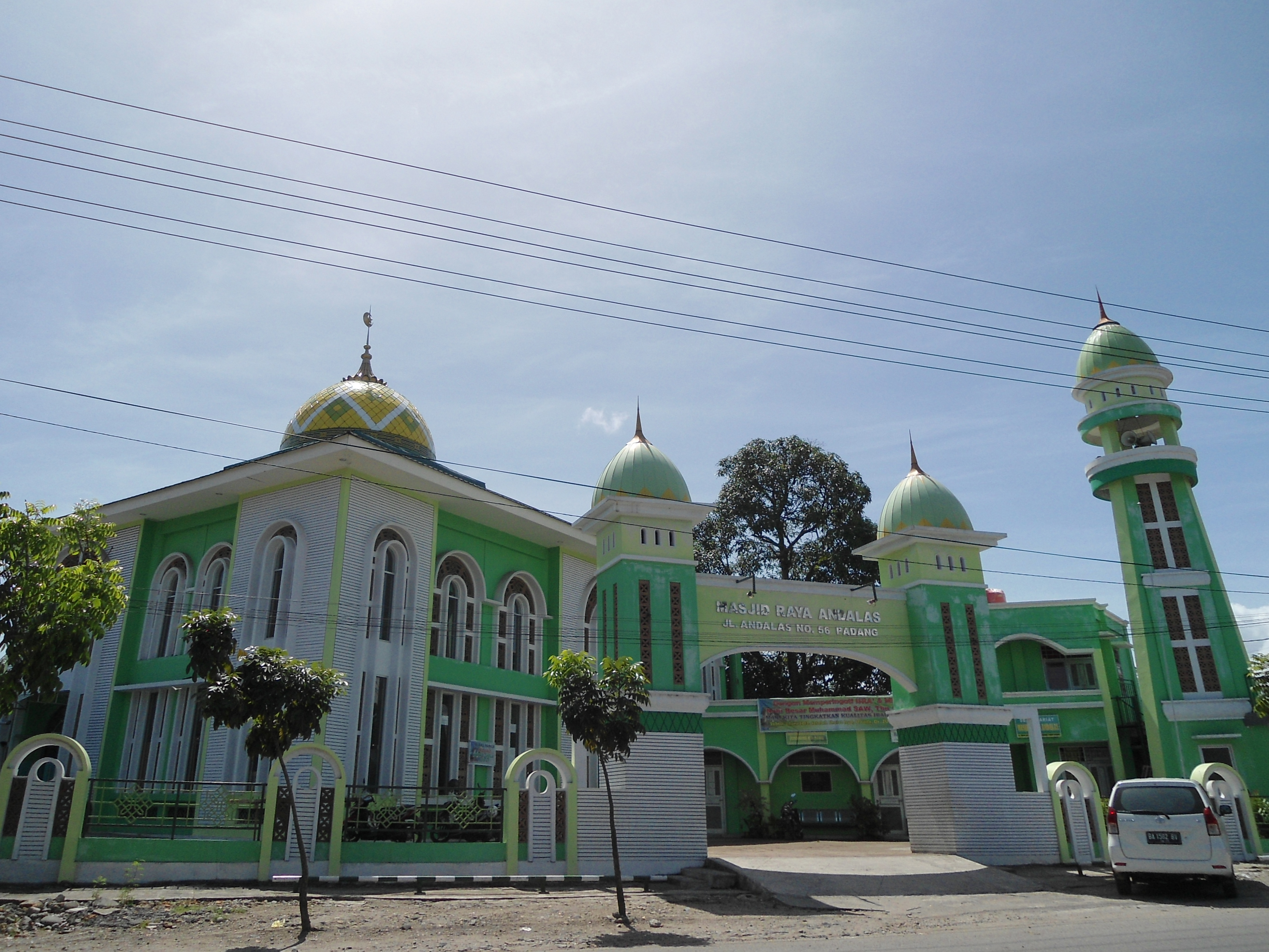

Religion
- Affiliation: Islam
- Branch/tradition: Sunni

Location
- Location: Andaleh Street no. 56, Andaleh, East Padang district, Padang, West Sumatera, Indonesia
- Interactive map of Andalas Grand Mosque; Masjid Raya Andalas

Architecture
- Type: Mosque

Specifications
- Direction of façade: Southeast and southwest
- Dome: 1
- Minaret: 1

Andalas Grand Mosque (also known as Andaleh in Minangkabau language; Indonesian: Masjid Raya Andalas) is a mosque located in Andaleh Street no.56, Andaleh, East Padang district, Padang, West Sumatra, Indonesia. The mosque consists of a green building with two floors which has area of 1,200 m^{2}, and a minaret in the southeast and an entrance gate in the south.

== Reconstruction ==
The mosque was one of the 608 religious sites in West Sumatra which got destroyed by the 2009 Sumatra earthquakes with a moment magnitude of 7.6. Given the alarming condition of the building, the mosque was later dismantled. Thus, religious activities in this mosque had been disrupted for a while, including the annual Ramadhan Pesantren during 2010 and 2011.

Reconstruction of the mosque was done shortly thereafter and fees were collected from public assistance sent through the Yayasan Satu Untuk Negeri (the One to Home) Foundation of TvOne. Reconstruction began on April 29, 2010 and was completed at a cost of 3.25 million rupiah in 2012. The mosque was officially inaugurated by the Minister of Communication and Information, Tifatul Sembiring, on March 9, 2012.

== See also ==
- Islam in Indonesia
- List of mosques in Indonesia
