= Balai Gadang Mungo Grand Mosque =

Mosque in Lima Puluh Kota, West Sumatra, Indonesia

Balai Gadang Mungo Grand Mosque Masjid Raya Balai Gadang Mungo
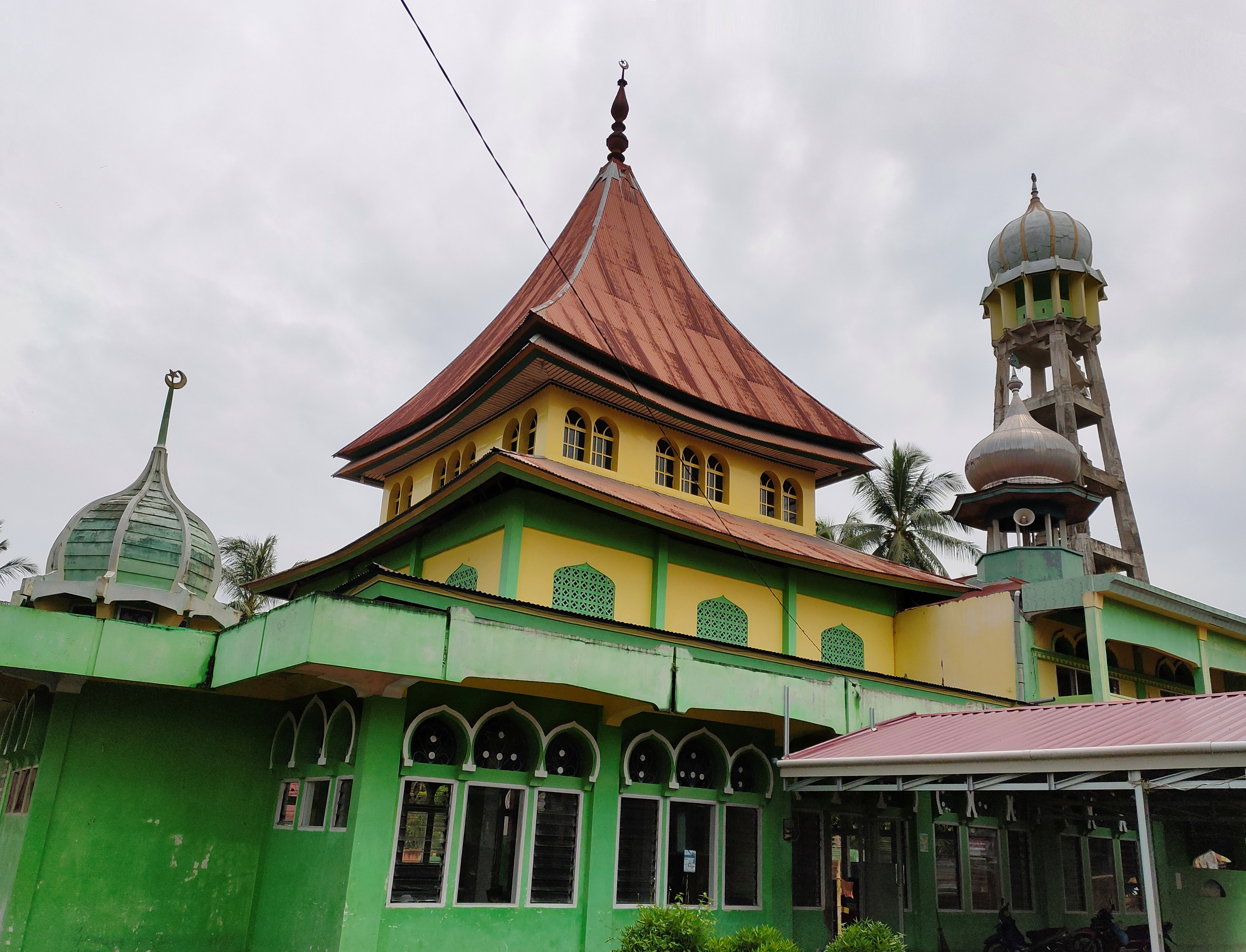

- Location within Sumatra Location within Indonesia

Religion
- Affiliation: Islam
- Branch/tradition: Sunni

Location
- Location: Jorong Balai Gadang Bawah, Nagari Mungo, Luhak, Lima Puluh Kota Regency, West Sumatra, Indonesia
- Interactive map of Balai Gadang Mungo Grand Mosque; Masjid Raya Balai Gadang Mungo
- Coordinates: 0.233489°S 100.699214°E

Architecture
- Type: Mosque
- Style: Minangkabau
- Groundbreaking: 1914

Specifications
- Dome: 1
- Minaret: 1
- Minaret height: 33 m

Balai Gadang Mungo Grand Mosque (Indonesian: Masjid Raya Balai Gadang Mungo) is an old mosque in Indonesia, located in Jorong Balai Gadang Bawah, Nagari Mungo, Luhak District, Lima Puluh Kota Regency, West Sumatra. The mosque was built in 1914, making it one of the oldest mosques in Indonesia, and the oldest mosque in Nagari Mungo.

== History ==
Construction of the mosque began in 1914, which was initiated by one of the prominent ulamas (clerics) in Nagari Mungo named Haji Badu Ghani. Initially, the building had only a floor and wall made of bamboo with palm fiber; thus, it was burned down during a long dry season in Nagari Mungo in 1918. Around a year later, Haji Badu Ghani invited two nephews, Haji Sultan and Haji Syarbaini, to re-build the mosque. With the support of many parties, including traditional leaders such as Tuanku Nan Balimo, reconstruction of the mosque was completed in 1920.

In 2012, the mosque was designated as one of the eleven locations of the 35th anniversary of the District of Limapuluh Kota in Luhak, held from June 25 to 28, 2012.

== See also ==
- Islam in Indonesia
- List of mosques in Indonesia
