= Tuo Koto Nan Ampek Mosque =

Mosque in Payakumbuh, West Sumatra, Indonesia

Coordinates: 0°13′59″S 100°37′21″E

Tuo Koto Nan Ampek Mosque Masjid Tuo Koto Nan Ampek
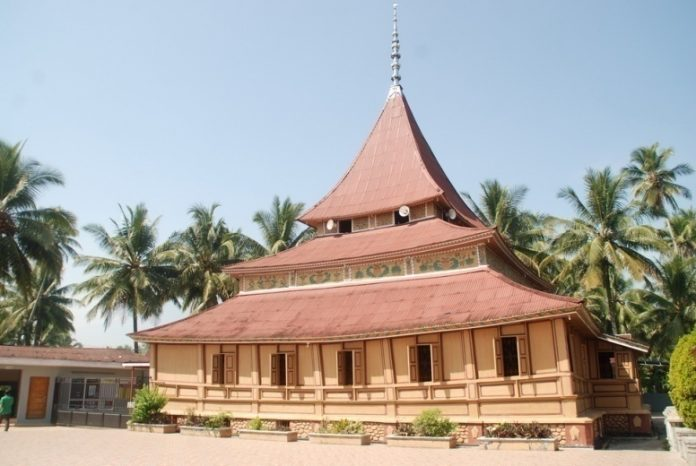

Religion
- Affiliation: Islam
- Branch/tradition: Sunni
- Leadership: Waqf

Location
- Location: Koto Nan Ampek Nagari, Payakumbuh, West Sumatra, Indonesia
- Interactive map of Tuo Koto Nan Ampek Mosque; Masjid Tuo Koto Nan Ampek

Architecture
- Type: Mosque
- Style: Minangkabau
- Completed: 1840

Specifications
- Capacity: 500 pilgrims
- Length: 20 m
- Width: 20 m
- Dome: 0
- Minaret: 0

The Tuo Koto Nan Ampek Mosque (Indonesian: Masjid Tuo Koto Nan Ampek), also known as Gadang Balai Nan Duo Mosque, is one of the oldest mosques in Indonesia, located in Koto Nan Ampek Nagari, now administratively included into the area of Balai Nan Duo village, West Payakumbuh District, city of Payakumbuh, West Sumatera. The Minangkabau architecture is thought to have been built in 1840 which was originally covered with fiber roofs before being replaced with zinc. Currently, other than being used for Muslim worship activities, this single-level mosque is also used by the surrounding community as a means of religious education.

== History ==
It is not known when exactly the mosque was begun building. According to an author Abdul Baqir Zein in his book entitled Historical Mosques in Indonesia, the mosque was estimated to be built in 1840 and named after its establishment, Koto Nan Ampek Nagari. The construction was led by three different leaders from respective tribes in Minangkabau: Datuk Kuniang from the Kampai tribe, Datuk Pangkai Sinaro from Piliang tribe, and Datuk Siri Dirajo from Malayu tribe.

Although it is one of the oldest mosques, most of the masts, floors, and walls made of wood have never been replaced since the first time the mosque was built. The mosque hasn't undergone many renovations thus its authenticity is still maintained. Because of erosion, however, the roof which was originally made from fibers was then replaced with zinc.

== See also ==
- List of mosques in Indonesia
