= Nurul Islam Great Mosque =

Mosque in Sawahlunto, West Sumatra, Indonesia

Coordinates: 0.686050°S 100.77775°E

Nurul Islam Great Mosque Sawahlunto Great Mosque Masjid Agung Nurul Islam
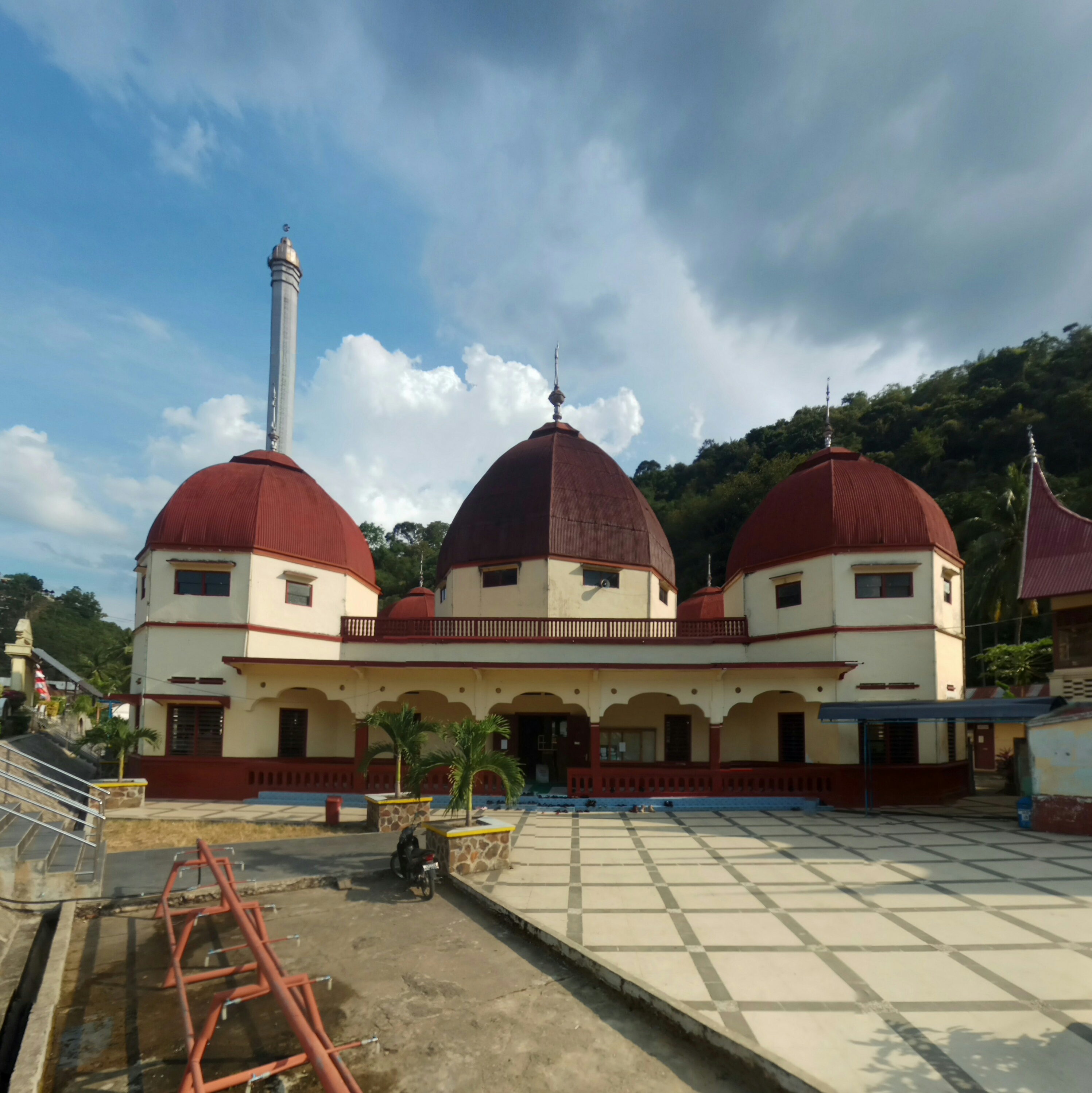
- front view

Religion
- Affiliation: Islam
- Branch/tradition: Sunni

Location
- Location: North Kubang Sirakuak, Lembah Segar, Sawahlunto, West Sumatra, Indonesia
- Interactive map of Nurul Islam Great Mosque; Sawahlunto Great Mosque; Masjid Agung Nurul Islam

Architecture
- Type: Mosque
- Groundbreaking: 1894

Specifications
- Length: 60 m
- Width: 60 m
- Dome: 5
- Minaret: 1
- Minaret height: 85 m

The Nurul Islam Great Mosque or also known as Sawahlunto Great Mosque is one of the oldest mosques in Indonesia located in Kubang Subdistrict of North Sirakuak, District of Lembah Segar, Sawahlunto town, West Sumatra. The location is about 150 meters from the Sawahlunto Railway Museum.

The mosque was built during the Dutch colonial period, and it was originally a steam power plant. The building was built in 1894 and changed its function to a mosque in 1952, while its chimney was later used as a minaret and a 10-meter dome was additionally built. The main building of the mosque measures 60 × 60 meters and has one large dome in the center surrounded by four smaller domes. Underneath the main building was a foxhole that had been used for assembling weapons such as hand grenades and mortars.

Currently in addition to its function as a place of worship for Muslims, this two-story mosque is also used as a place of religious education for the surrounding community.

== History ==
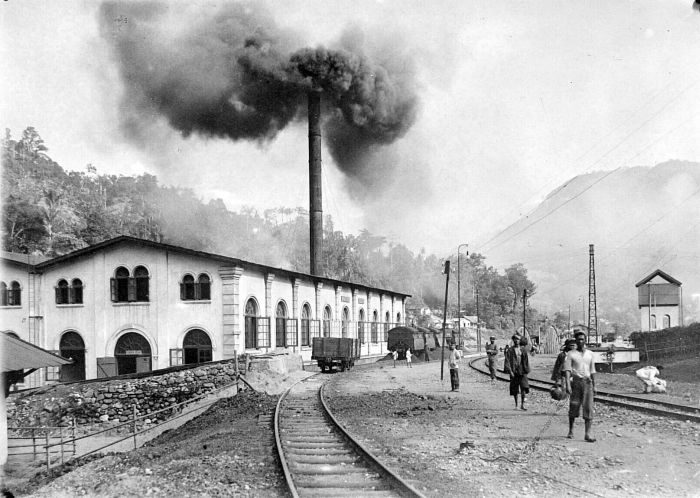
Smoke coming out of the chimney during the time when it was a power plant.

The growth of infrastructure in Sawahlunto town triggered by coal mining activities experienced a rapid development in the late 19th century. In line with that, to be able to move various electric machines, the government of the Dutch East Indies built a steam powered power plant by utilizing the stream of Batang Lunto River in Kubang Sirakuak in 1894. Considering the water level on the edge of the power plant was increasingly decreasing however, the government of the Dutch East Indies built a replacement power plant in Salak, Talawi in 1924 which utilizes the stream of Batang Ombilin River.

No longer functional power plant building in Kubang Sirakuak was then used as a place for protection and assembly of weapons by independence fighters in Sawahlunto during the Indonesian revolution before finally converted into a mosque in 1952, while the chimney as high as more than 75 meters was turned into minarets, and an additional 10 meters tall dome was added.
