= Tuo Kayu Jao Mosque =

Mosque in Solok, West Sumatra, Indonesia

Tuo Kayu Jao Mosque Masjid Tuo Kayu Jao
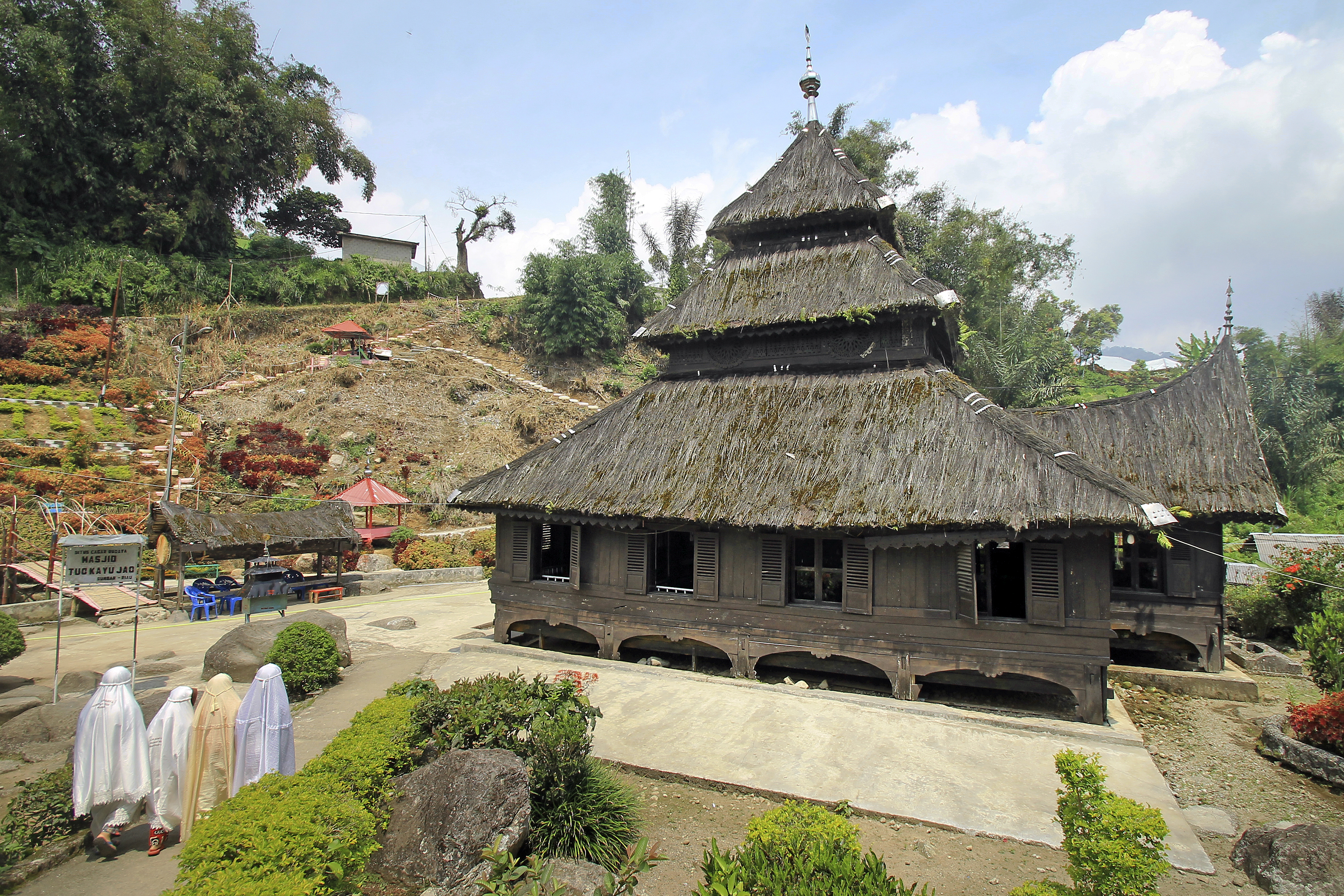

Religion
- Affiliation: Islam
- Branch/tradition: Sunni

Location
- Location: Jorong Kayu Jao, Batang Barus Nagari, Gunung Talang District, Solok Regency, West Sumatra, Indonesia
- Interactive map of Tuo Kayu Jao Mosque; Masjid Tuo Kayu Jao

Architecture
- Type: Mosque
- Style: Minangkabau
- Groundbreaking: 16th Century

Specifications
- Length: 15 m
- Width: 10 m
- Dome: 0
- Minaret: 0

The Tuo Kayu Jao Mosque (Indonesian: Old Mosque of Kayu Jao) is an old mosque in Indonesia that is located in Jorong Kayu Jao, Batang Barus Nagari, Gunung Talang District, Solok Regency, West Sumatra. The existence of the mosque was already recorded in 1599, making it the oldest mosque in Solok Regency and among the oldest surviving mosques in Indonesia.

The mosque is registered on the list of heritages in West Sumatra, which is overseen by the Preservation Hall of Ancient Relics. The mosque has been restored several times, including the restoration of one of the pillars and the replacement of the old palm roof with a new one due to its erosion. Even undergoing those restorations, however, the authenticity of the mosque is well preserved.

== History ==
It is not known exactly what year the mosque was actually completed. Based on a number of records, the mosque is considered built in 1599, while other records show older dates. Apart from these differences, it is known that the construction of the mosque was made following the proliferation of Islam in the Solok region in the 16th century. Nagari where the mosque is located has been previously established by the three leaderships of the Minangkabau community. According to the local community leaders, there are two people who played a role in the construction of this mosque, namely Angku Musaur and Angku Labai, both of which are buried not far from the mosque.

== See also ==
- List of mosques in Indonesia
