= Great Jami' Mosque of Singaraja =

Mosque in Bali, Indonesia

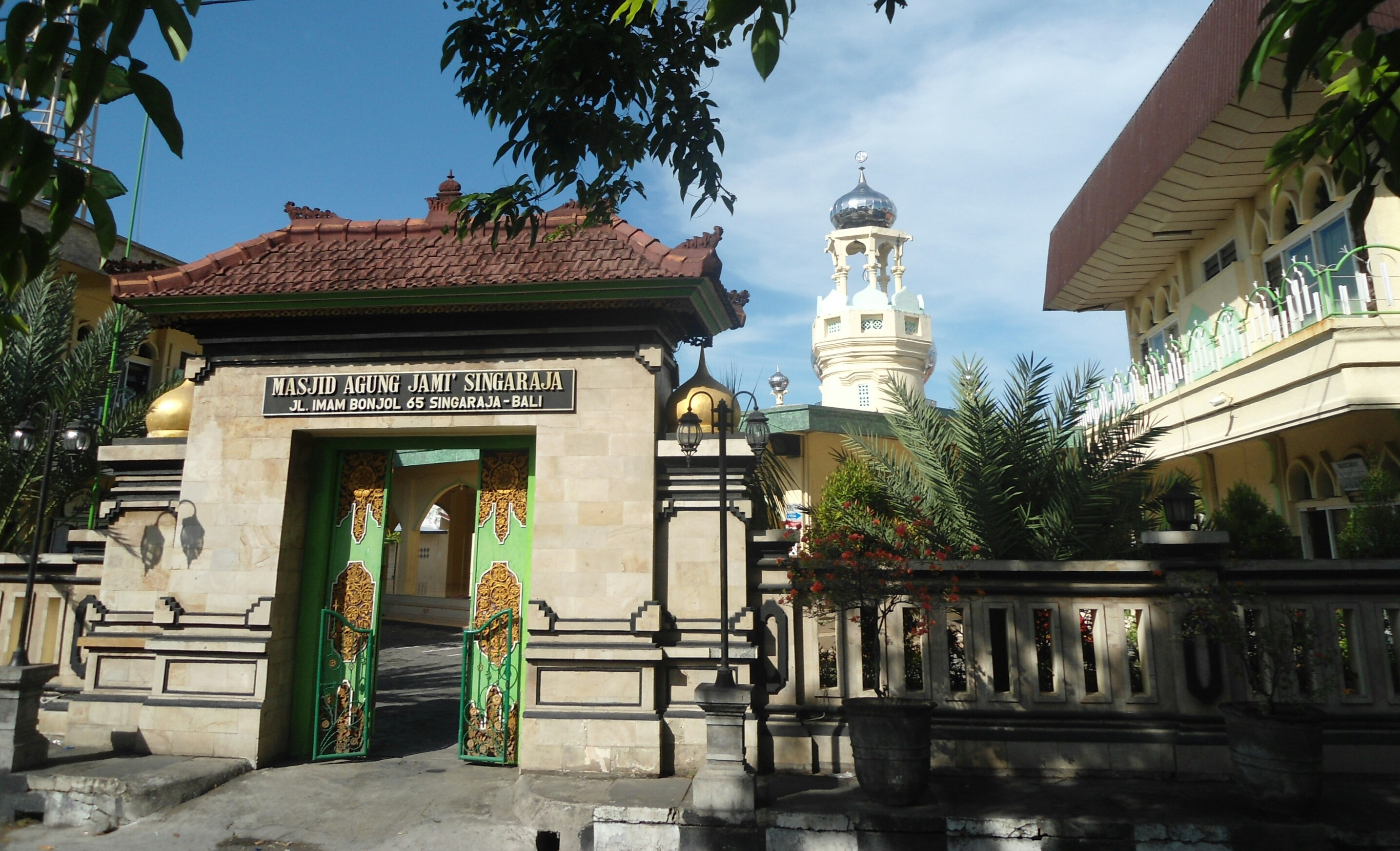
- Main entrance to the mosque.

- Location in Indonesia

Religion
- Affiliation: Sunni Islam

Location
- Location: Jalan Imam Bonjol No.65, Kampung Kajanan, Kec. Buleleng, Kabupaten Buleleng, Bali 81114, Indonesia
- Country: Indonesia
- Interactive map of Great Jami' Mosque of Singaraja
- Coordinates: 8°06′21″S 115°05′21″E

Architecture
- Type: Mosque
- Style: Javanese architecture, Islamic architecture
- Completed: 1830; 1860 (Reconstruction)

Specifications
- Dome: 1
- Minaret: 1

The Great Jami' Mosque of Singaraja (Balinese: ᬫᬲ᭄ᬚᬶᬤ᭄ᬅᬕᬸᬂᬚᬫᬶᬓ᭄ᬱᬶᬗᬭᬚ; Indonesian: Masjid Agung Jamik Singaraja) is a mosque located in Singaraja within the Buleleng Regency in Bali, Indonesia. Built in the 19th century, it is one of the earliest mosques to be built in the northern sector of Bali. It houses a copy of the Qur'an that was handwritten by Gusti Ngurah Jelantik, one of the last rulers of the Buleleng Kingdom.

== History ==
The mosque was built on the orders of Gusti Ngurah Jelantik, a ruler of the Buleleng Kingdom that ruled over parts of northern Bali from their capital in Singaraja. The original mosque was completed in 1830, being the second mosque to be built in Singaraja after the Keramat Kuno Mosque, as well as one of the oldest mosques in northern Bali. With the increasing rise of the Muslim population, the mosque was gradually rebuilt in the 1840s, although construction was halted in 1846 when the Dutch colonial forces attacked the Buleleng Kingdom, taking captive most of the Buleleng royalty including Gusti Ngurah Jelantik and his advisor, a Muslim scholar named Abdullah Maskati. As indicated by an inscription, the reconstructed mosque was ultimately completed in 1860 under approval from colonial authorities. Throughout the construction, Balinese Hindus and Muslims both worked together to build the mosque, hence making the mosque a symbol of religious tolerance and harmony in Bali.

The mosque is a heritage site of the Buleleng Regency area. It also serves as a congregational mosque where the Friday prayers are held, as well as festive prayers on the Islamic festivals of Eid al-Fitr and Eid al-Adha.

== Architecture ==
The mosque has a rectangular layout, while its main building skewers off the streets in order to face Mecca, the direction of the qibla. Rectangular fences surround the mosque that are in line with the street. Being sandwiched between Imam Bonjol Road and Noor Mosque Road, the mosque has two entrances which lead into it, with the main entrance facing the former.

The main entrance of the mosque is an elaborately carved gateway made out of bricks, with a pagoda-like roof and small cupolas adorning it. This gate was originally from the residence of Gusti Ngurah Jelantik, who gave the order for it to be dismantled and reassembled as part of the mosque complex. Due to its origins, the gateway adds Hindu elements to the predominately Islamic style of the mosque.

The main prayer hall of the mosque is fully carpeted and held up by four concrete pillars with green bases, while a section of the hall is segregated with wooden barriers for female worshippers. The entrance of the main prayer hall is held up by two cuboid concrete pillars with green floral motifs.

To the north of the main prayer hall is an ancillary building that contains administrative offices as well as classrooms, toilets, and ritual ablution spaces. The roof of the building is flat and painted in a similar colour to the terraced roof of the main mosque building. This building is a modern addition to the mosque, constructed during late 20th-century renovations.

The minaret of the mosque stands in the space between the main prayer hall and the ancillary building, while being connected to the former. It starts with a cylindrical base and body, with the top and balcony being hexagonal in layout. A silver dome stands on a raised platform atop the hexagonal balcony. Dotted windows line the corners of the minaret's body and act as ventilation for the interior.

== Manuscripts of the Qur'an ==
Several handwritten manuscripts of the Qur'an, known as mushaf, that were written by the Muslim descendants of the Buleleng royalty, are kept in the mosque as part of a private collection. The oldest of these manuscripts was written by the founder of the mosque, Gusti Ngurah Jelantik, after his conversion to Sunni Islam and attaining the title of hafidh. This manuscript is written in a stylized Arabic font, while there are also explanatory notes and supplications written by the founder himself.

== See also ==
- List of mosques in Indonesia
