= Sultan of Ternate Mosque =

Mosque in Ternate, North Maluku, Indonesia

- Masjid Sultan Ternate
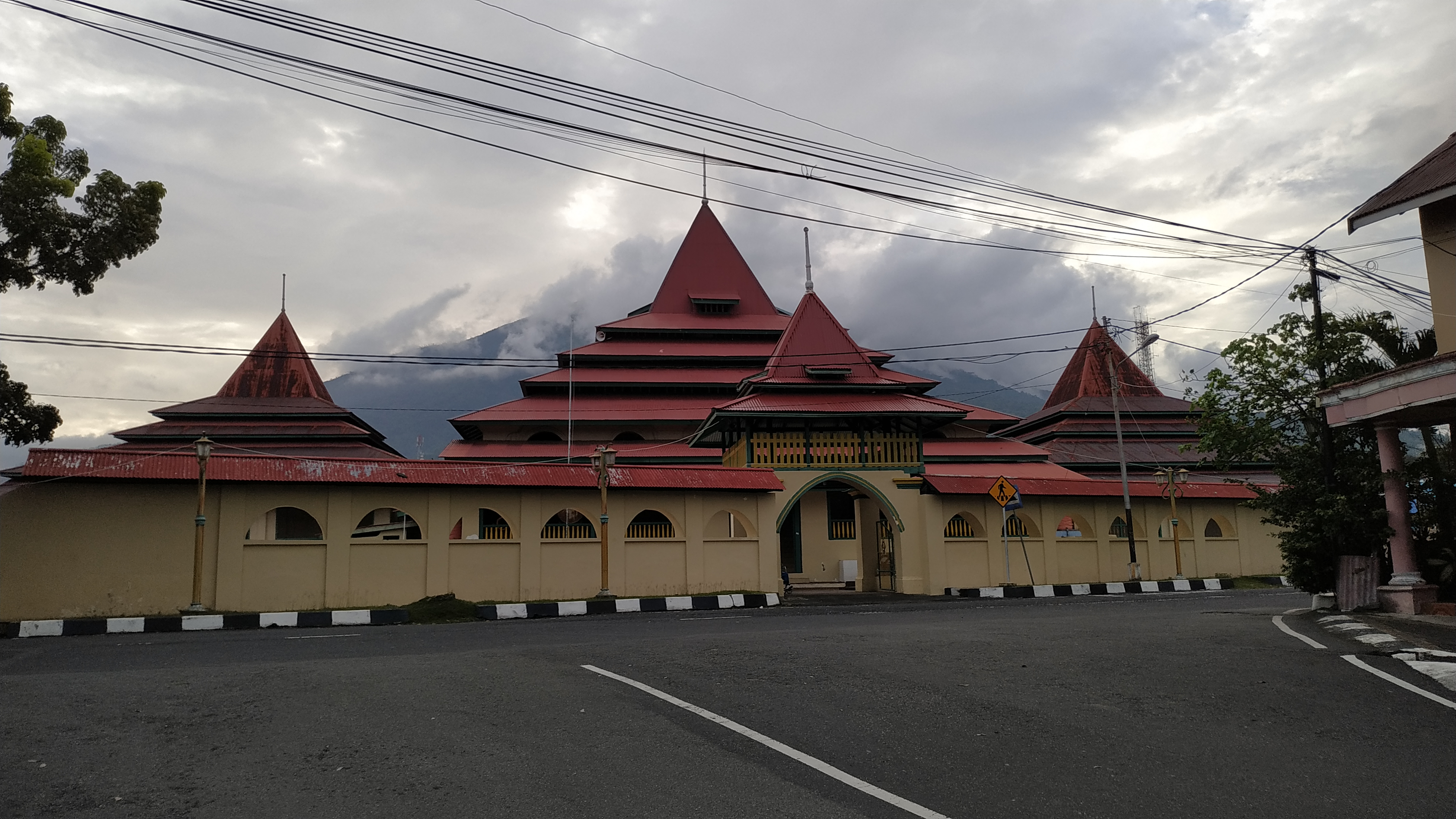

Religion
- Affiliation: Islam
- Branch/tradition: Sunni
- Province: North Maluku
- Status: Active

Location
- Location: Ternate City, Indonesia
- Interactive map of Sultan of Ternate Mosque
- Coordinates: 0.798466°N 127.385331°E

Architecture
- Type: Mosque
- Style: Vernacular
- Groundbreaking: 1606

Specifications
- Direction of façade: east
- Length: 39.3 metres (129 ft)
- Width: 22.4 metres (73 ft)
- Height (max): 21.74 metres (71.3 ft)
- Materials: stone, cement, tile-works, steel-iron, corrugated steel roof

Sultan of Ternate Mosque (Indonesian Masjid Sultan Ternate), also known as the Old Mosque of Ternate, is an old mosque in Ternate City, Indonesia. It is the largest mosque in the city and the royal mosque of the Ternate Sultanate.

== Location ==
The Sultan of Ternate Mosque is located on the eastern side of the volcanic island of Ternate Island; precisely in Soa Sio Administrative Village, Ternate Utara Subdistrict of the Ternate City. Mount Gamalama provides a backdrop for the mosque.

== The mosque ==
The mosque follows the typical vernacular mosque architecture of Indonesia, which is similarly influenced by the traditional mosque architecture of Java. The mosque building consists of a main prayer hall and a front hall (serambi). The serambi, a porch-like front hall, provides access to the main prayer hall area. The ablution area is placed to the north and south of the serambi. The serambi is semi-attached to the main prayer hall; structurally its double-tiered roof is not connected with the roof of the main prayer hall, a typical fashion of Javanese mosque architecture.

The main prayer hall follows the language of mosque architecture in Indonesia. It features a five-tiered corrugated steel roof (originally of thatched material). This roof is supported by four main posts (saka guru) and additional twelve supporting posts. The uppermost roof-tier is much steeper than the rest of the roof tiers; four hatches provide cross ventilation. The top of the roof is decorated with a pole, symbolizing the Arabic letter alif, which symbolizes Allah. The mosque has a square layout and aligned roughly east–west. An ornate minbar is placed in the mihrab.

The mosque complex is surrounded by a wall. An entrance is located at the west end of the complex, forming a gateway building. On the top of this gateway is a 3 x 4.2 meter roofed space to announce prayer (replacing the function of a minaret). This gateway is topped with an 8-meter two-tiered roof.

== History ==
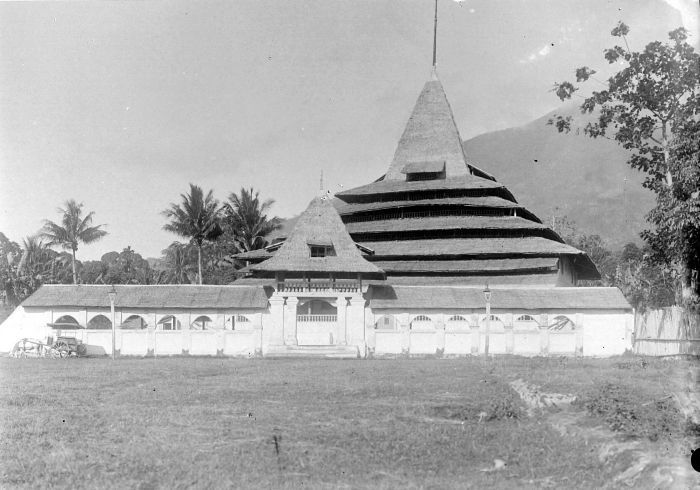
The mosque with its original thatched-roof in early 20th century.

There are differing opinions about the founding time of the Sultan of Ternate Mosque. The current mosque building was probably built in early 17th-century, around 1606, by the ninth Sultan Hamzah. It is very likely that the current mosque building replaced an earlier mosque 16th-century mosque, since it has been known that the Sultanate of Ternate was powerful during the course of the 16th century.

The mosque has been restored several times, including the replacement of the original sago thatched material of the roof with corrugated steel, as well as demolition of some of the fence and other additional buildings.

== Tradition and rituals ==
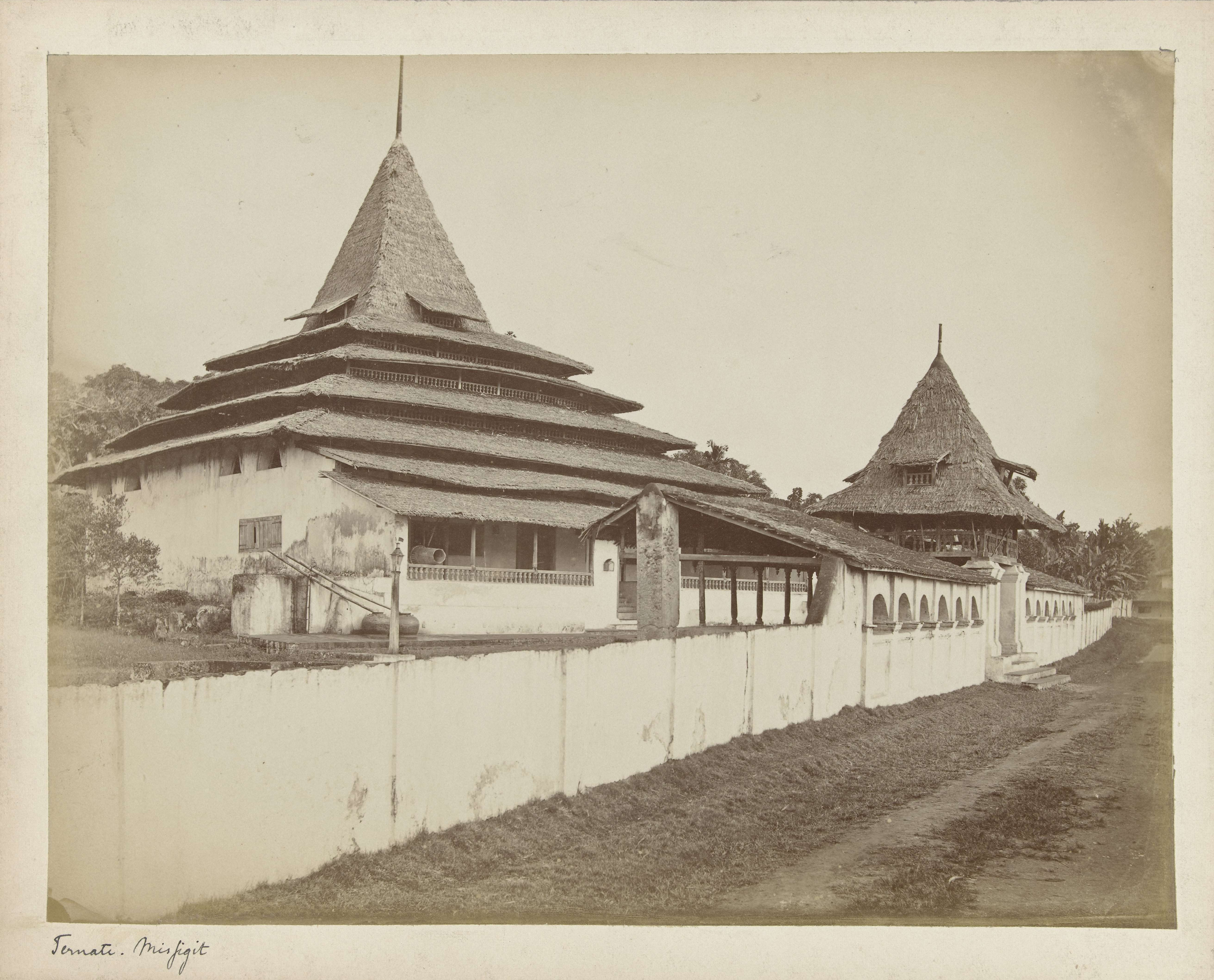
The Sultan of Ternate Mosque in late 19th-century

The Sultan of Ternate Mosque adopts a unique tradition. Only men are allowed to enter the mosque, women are not allowed in order to maintain the sanctity of the mosque. Another rule is the prohibition of wearing sarong inside the mosque; wearing trousers and a headscarf or cap are obligatory.

There are several rituals unique to this mosque; one of the ritual is the qunut ritual on the 16th night of Ramadan, known as the Malam Qunut ("qunut night"). During the Malam Qunut, the Sultan performed a ceremony known as Kolano Uci Sabea. In this ceremony, the Sultan and his family arrived at the mosque in a palanquin, performed the tarawih prayer, helped by the Bobato Akhirat (the Sultanate council of religious matter), and then returned to his kedaton ("palace") in a palanquin. In the kedaton, the Sultan and his queen (Boki) will perform a special prayer for the ancestor inside a special room located above the shrine of the ancestor. After this prayer, the Sultan and his queen will meet the people of Ternate.

== See also ==
- List of mosques in Indonesia

== Works cited ==
- I.G.N. Anom; Tjepi Kusman (1991). Soekatno Tw.; Samidi (eds.). Album Peninggalan Sejarah dan Purbakala [Album of Historical and Archeological Heritage] (in Indonesian). Jakarta: Direktorat Jenderal Kebudayaan. ISBN 9789798250002.
- Muna Zakiah (March 5, 2014). "Masjid Tua Ternate - Maluku Utara" [Ternate Old Mosque - North Maluku]. Kebudayaan Indonesia (in Indonesian). Direktorat Jenderal Kebudayaan Republik Indonesia. Archived from the original on November 14, 2015.
