= Al-Mansur Mosque =

Mosque in Jakarta, Indonesia

- Masjid Jami Al Mansur
- Location within Indonesia

Religion
- Affiliation: Islam
- Branch/tradition: Sunni

Location
- Location: Jembatan Lima, Tambora, West Jakarta, Jakarta, Indonesia
- Interactive map of Al-Mansur Mosque
- Coordinates: 6°08′46.5″S 106°48′22.8″E

Architecture
- Type: Mosque
- Founder: Raden Abdul Malik
- Established: 1717

The Al-Mansur Mosque (Indonesian: Masjid Jami Al Mansur) is one of the oldest mosques in Jakarta, Indonesia. The mosque is located at Jembatan Lima, Tambora, Jakarta. The mosque is one of the listed cultural heritage of Jakarta. The mosque is named after Kh. Mohammad Mansur who is familiarly called Guru Mansur- a Betawi figure known for his fight against Dutch colonial rules.

== History ==
Raden Abdul Malik, who is also called Prince Cakrajaya Adiningrat, founded this mosque in the 18th century (1717 AD) for the purposes of worship as well as a means of community mental education against invaders. Formerly named Jami Kampung Sawah, this mosque has a role in the struggle for Indonesian independence against the Dutch and Japanese under the leadership of KH. Mohammad Mansyur. During 1947-1948 there was a gun-fighting between nationalist forces and NICA soldiers, when Mansur tried to erect a Red-and-White flag in minarets that now look obsolete mosque. After Moh. Mansyur died on 12 May 1967, the mosque was named Masjid Jami al-Mansyur. This mosque is listed as a cultural heritage object Governor's Decree no. Cb. 11/1/12/72 dated January 10, 1972 (State Gazette No. 60/1972).

== Architecture ==
The main hall of the mosque which is also the oldest building has an area size of 12 by 14.40 metres (39.4 ft × 47.2 ft). The striking element is the four solid pillars that look solid in the middle. The bottom of the columns is octagonal and above it there is a buffer, bell pellet and flat. The main stem (in the center) is round and decorated with seams as well. The top section is rectangular and limited by seam. At half height between the four pillars there are wooden beams, among others, to support the two stairs leading to the attic. On top of the 55 centimetres (22 in) wide beams on the right and left side fitted 80 centimetres (31 in) high fence. This fence pattern is rhomboid. This construction and the shape of a western-style sokoguru. The roof of this mosque overlap in the form of limasan. The Tower, located in a new room in front of the old mosque, cylindrical shape as high as 12 metres (39 ft). In the fourth and fifth part of the tower there is a terrace with iron fences. The roof of the minaret was a semicircular dome.

== See also ==
- Islam in Indonesia
- List of mosques in Indonesia
