= Agung Manunggal Bantul Mosque =

Mosque in Bantul, Yogyakarta, Indonesia

Coordinates: 7.88011°S 110.332665°E

Agung Manunggal Bantul Mosque Masjid Agung Manunggal Bantul

Religion
- Affiliation: Islam
- Branch/tradition: Sunni

Location
- Location: Jl. Jenderal Sudirman no.1, Bantul, Yogyakarta, Indonesia
- Interactive map of Agung Manunggal Bantul Mosque; Masjid Agung Manunggal Bantul

Architecture
- Type: Mosque
- Style: Javanese

The Agung Manunggal Bantul Mosque (Indonesian: Masjid Agung Manunggal Bantul) is a mosque located in Jenderal Sudirman St. No.1, Bantul, Yogyakarta, Indonesia. The mosque contains a unique Javanese architectural style resembling Agung Demak Mosque, with typical characteristics such as a mustaka (roof) which resembles Joglo, four saka (pillars) which are carved from teak wood, and an entrance in the shape of Gunungan (Javanese iconic Wayang shape). The mosque can be reached by using private vehicles or public transportation, namely the bus which connects Yogyakarta and Bantul. From Giwangan terminal, visitors take the bus which bounds to Bantul street then get off at the Klodran intersection. The mosque is located right in the western part of the Klodran intersection adjacent to Bantul Regency Red Cross as well as a field where functions as parking spaces during large ceremonies.

== See also ==
- Islam in Indonesia
- List of mosques in Indonesia
