= Jami Mosque of Sintang =

Mosque in Sintang, West Kalimantan, Indonesia

- Masjid Jami' Sultan Nata
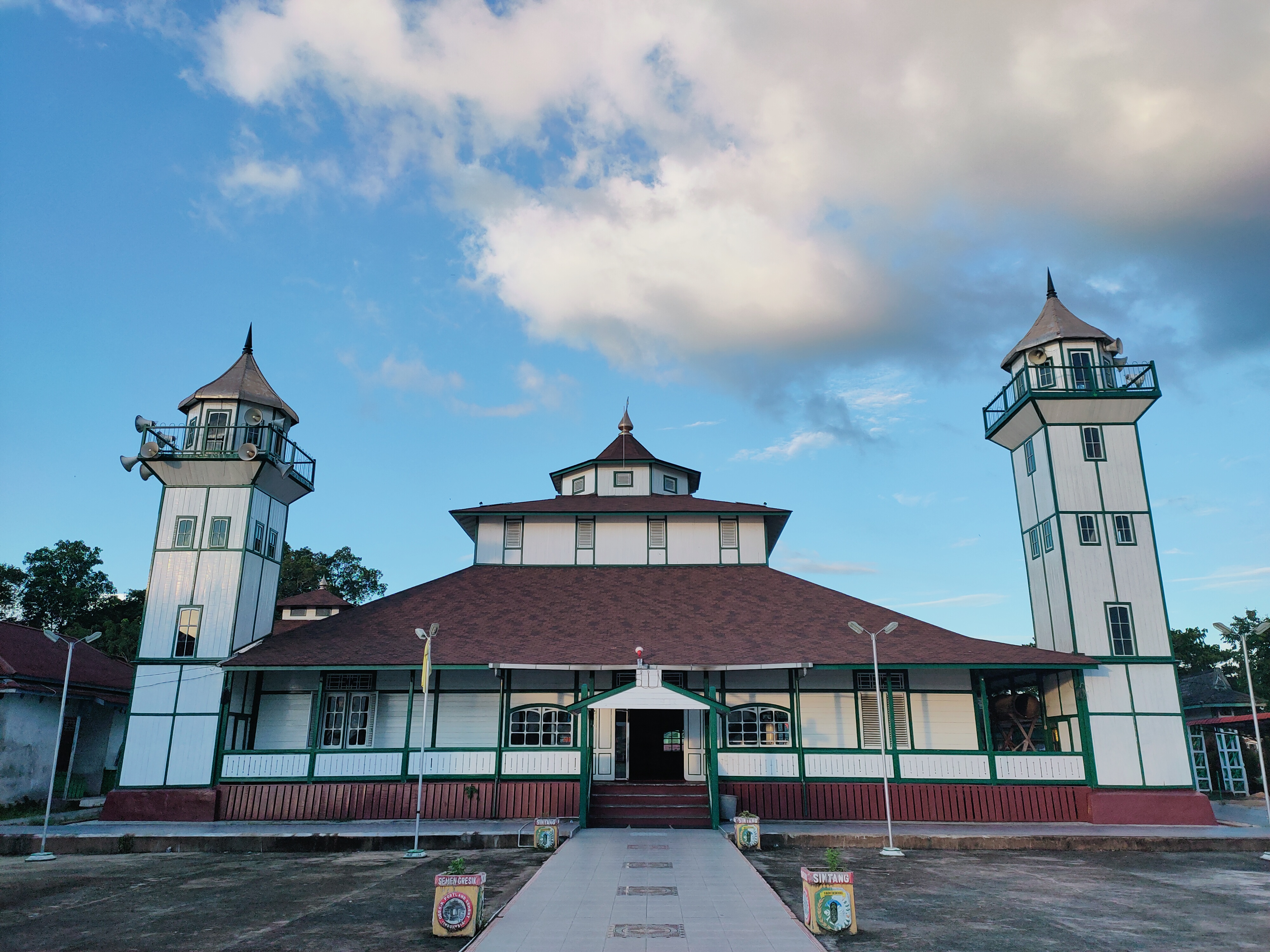

Religion
- Affiliation: Islam
- Branch/tradition: Sunni

Location
- Location: Sintang, West Kalimantan, Indonesia
- Interactive map of Jami Mosque of Sintang
- Coordinates: 0.082496°N 111.489674°E

Architecture
- Type: Mosque
- Style: Banjarese
- Completed: 1672
- Minaret: 2

Jami Mosque of Sintang also known as Sultan Nata Mosque is a mosque located in Sintang, West Kalimantan, Indonesia. The mosque is located within the complex of Istana al-Mukarrammah, the main palace of the Sultanate of Sintang, a kingdom in Sintang which existed since the 13th-century.

== History ==
The mosque was instrumental in the spread of Islam in Sintang. During the reign of Pangeran Agung, the 17th Raja of Sintang, Islam became the official religion of the kingdom, replacing the former official religion of Hinduism. However, at that time, Sintang did not have a mosque. The learning of Islam was still held in the palace complex, balai kerajaan. Pangeran Tunggal, the son of Pangeran Agung, decided to build a small-sized mosque with a capacity of 50 people. This small mosque is the forerunner of the Jami Mosque of Sintang.

During the reign of Sultan Nata Muhammad Syamsudin (the 19th Sultan of Sintang, the first ruler to use sultan as his title), this small mosque was expanded to become the main mosque of the Sintang Sultanate. The mosque was inaugurated on Muharram 12, 1083 AH (corresponds to May 9, 1672). During the reign of Sultan Abdurrasyid Muhammad Jamaludin (the 21st Raja of Sintang), the mosque was renovated and expanded. The Jami Mosque of Sintang has become an official place of religious activities in the Sultanate of Sintang. During the reign of Raden Abdul Bahri Danu Perdana al-Mukaram (1935), two minarets were added to the left and right of the mosque.

In 1987, the mosque was officially named after the founder of the mosque, Jami Mosque Sultan Nata Sintang.

== Architecture ==
The architecture of the Jami Mosque of Sintang was typical of the river region of West Kalimantan. The mosque is constructed out of the ulin or belian wood, a type of very good quality hardwood native to Borneo. The foundation, the frame of the buildings, the beams, the roof cover, and the floorboards were made of the belian wood.

The mosque consists of three tiers of roofs; the first and the second lowest tier are pyramidal in shape, the third uppermost tier has an octagonal base. The two minarets flanking the mosque have a square base but topped with an octagonal room with an octagonal based conical roofs. The minaret on the right-side of the mosque is shorter than the one on the left. The wall of the mosque is painted white and green. The eight saka guru main posts in the center of the building are the only part that is never replaced or renewed. Myths surround the existence of these 10 metres (33 ft) main posts.

== See also ==
- List of mosques in Indonesia

== Cited works ==
- Zein, Abdul Baqir (1999). Masjid-masjid bersejarah di Indonesia. Gema Insani. ISBN 979561567X.
- Lukman Solihin (2009). "Masjid Jamik Sultan Nata Sintang". Melayu Online. Badan Kajian dan Pengembangan Budaya Melayu. Archived from the original on November 21, 2017.
