= Nurul Huda Mosque of Gelgel =

Mosque in Klungkung, Bali, Indonesia

Nurul Huda Mosque of Gelgel Masjid Nurul Huda

Religion
- Affiliation: Islam

Location
- Location: Kampung Gelgel, Klungkung, Bali, Indonesia

Architecture
- Type: Mosque
- Established: 14th century 16th century
- Completed: 1863/1970th

Specifications
- Dome: little 1
- Minaret: 1
- Minaret height: 17 m

Nurul Huda Mosque of Kampung Gelgel is a historic mosque in Bali, Indonesia. It is considered the oldest mosque in Bali and one of the earliest in the Indonesian archipelago. The mosque is located in the village of Gelgel, Klungkung Regency.

== Description ==
It is said that the mosque was first founded by the 40 Muslim soldiers of the Majapahit Empire, who accompanied the king of Gelgel, Dalem Ketut Klesir, after the Majapahit king Hayam Wuruk summoned the kings throughout the archipelago for a conference. The Muslim soldiers settled down with permission from the king, and the mosque was used as a place for worship and the center to spread Islam in Bali. This makes it the first mosque in the island of Bali. Another account tells that the mosque was founded by Muslim missionaries in the 16th century, who decided to settle down in Bali.

Since the foundation, the mosque became a center of the Muslim village with around 300 families. Today, not only Balinese Muslims but Muslim immigrants from the other islands reside in the village.

The mosque has been renovated numerous times and it has transformed into a big mosque. The mosque is equipped with a 17-meters minaret. Although there is no old building left, the mimbar retains its original shape.
