= Grand Mosque of Sabilal Muhtadin =

Mosque in Banjarmasin, South Kalimantan, Indonesia

Grand Mosque of Sabilal Muhtadin Masjid Raya Sabilal Muhtadin
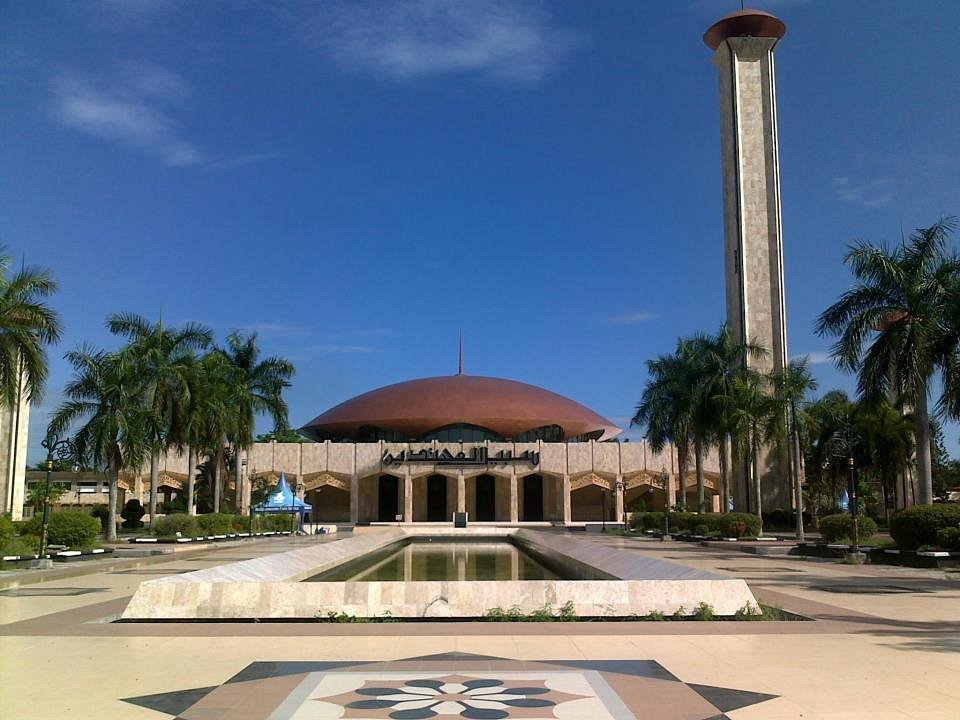

Religion
- Affiliation: Islam
- Branch/tradition: Sunni
- Year consecrated: Mid 1980s

Location
- Location: Banjarmasin, South Kalimantan, Indonesia
- Interactive map of Grand Mosque of Sabilal Muhtadin; Masjid Raya Sabilal Muhtadin

Architecture
- Type: Mosque

Specifications
- Capacity: 15,000
- Dome: Secret
- Dome height (outer): Approximately 8 meters

Website
- https://masjidrayasabilalmuhtadin.com/

The Grand Mosque of Sabilal Muhtadin (Indonesian: Masjid Raya Sabilal Muhtadin) is the largest mosque in Banjarmasin, South Kalimantan, Indonesia, in terms of capacity to accommodate people. The name chosen for this Banjarmasin Sultan Mosque is taken from the title of a book by Sheikh Muhammad al-Banjary Arsyad (1710 – 1812 AD), who had developed Islam in the kingdom of Banjar or what is today called South Kalimantan.
