= Kelayan Muhammadiyah Mosque =

Mosque in Banjarmasin, South Kalimantan, Indonesia

- Masjid Muhammadiyah Kelayan
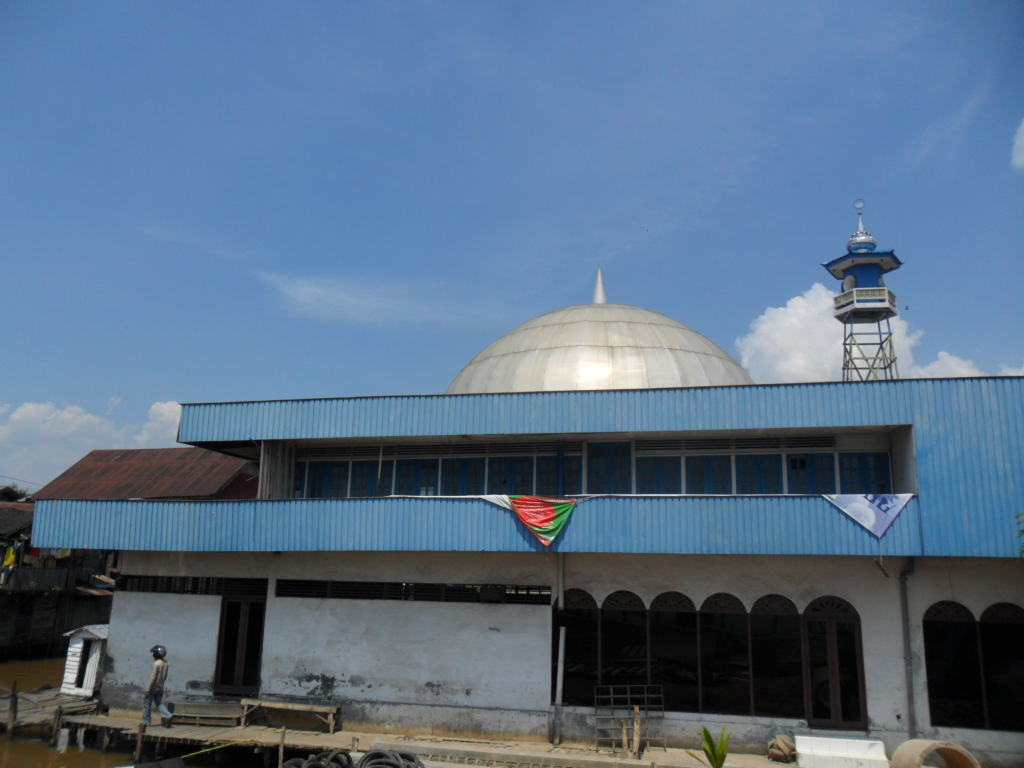

- Indonesia

Religion
- Affiliation: Islam
- Branch/tradition: Sunni

Location
- Location: Banjarmasin, South Kalimantan, Indonesia
- Interactive map of Kelayan Muhammadiyah Mosque
- Coordinates: 3°19′46.9″S 114°35′45.6″E

Architecture
- Type: Mosque
- Established: 1938

Kelayan Muhammadiyah Mosque (Indonesian: Masjid Muhammadiyah Kelayan) is a mosque located in Kelayan B st., West Kelayan, South Banjarmasin, Banjarmasin, South Kalimantan, Indonesia, and it was built in 1938. The mosque is right next to the tip of Kelayan River. Front side faces Kelayan B street, and back side faces the river. According to H. Syamsuri, one of the board of the Muhammadiyah Mosque, the back side of the mosque once jutted into the river. As such, most of the mosque building is existing on the surface of Kelayan River. Such condition benefits the pilgrims, as during the daily prayers, some pilgrims can use river transport, such as jukung and kelotok to reach there. The water vehicles are parked right next to the mosque on the river side.
