= Teluk Bayur Grand Mosque =

Mosque in Padang, West Sumatra, Indonesia

Coordinates: 0.995672°S 100.369707°E

Teluk Bayur Grand Mosque Masjid Raya Teluk Bayur
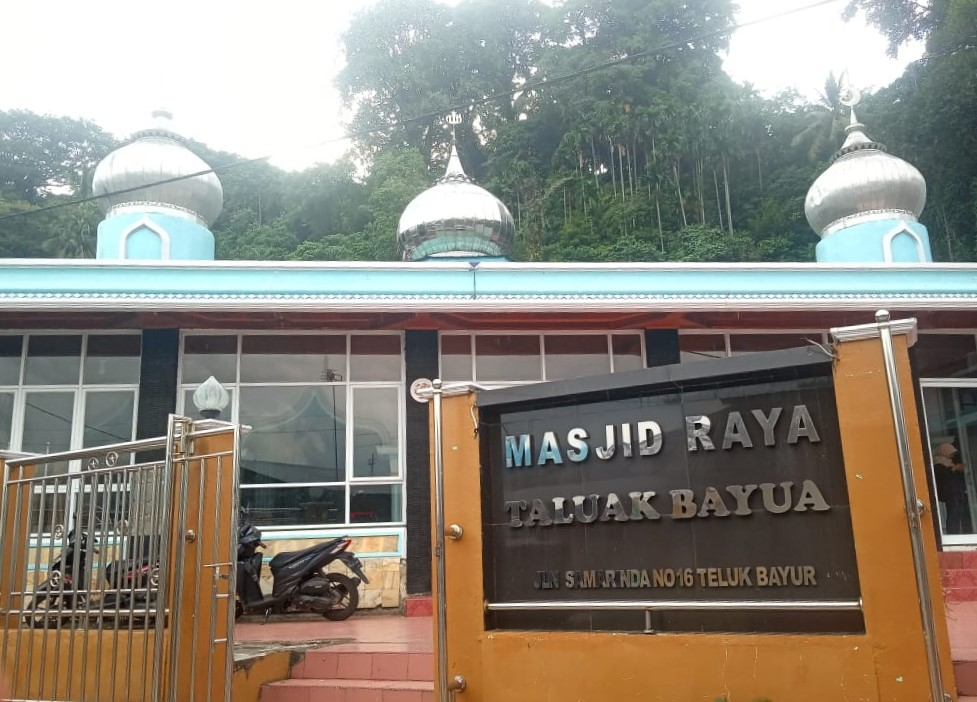

Religion
- Affiliation: Islam
- Branch/tradition: Sunni

Location
- Location: South Padang district, Padang, West Sumatra, Indonesia
- Interactive map of Teluk Bayur Grand Mosque; Masjid Raya Teluk Bayur

Architecture
- Type: Mosque
- Groundbreaking: 17th century
- Dome: 1

The Teluk Bayur Grand Mosque (Indonesian: Masjid Raya Teluk Bayur), also known as Surau Ateh, is an old mosque in Indonesia which is located near the Port of Teluk Bayur, South Padang district, Padang, West Sumatra. Although the mosque was previously a surau (Islamic assembly building) which was recorded to have stood since the 17th century, the building that stands at its current location was built during the Dutch colonization around the 19th century.

Today, other than being used as a religious site of Islam, the first floor of the mosque is also used as an educational place for the religion and a studying place for Pesantren (Islamic boarding school).

== History ==
The mosque has been established since the 17th century, but previously it was a surau, which was located in a different place from the current building. The surau was founded by an Arabic merchant named Abdullah, who was known to have been killed by being involved in a fight against the Dutch East India Company that was taking control of the Bayur region in 1696.

The current mosque was built following the expansion of Bayur Bay area by the Dutch East Indies in 1888. At the time, all trading activities and sea transportation took place at the port, including the departure of hajj pilgrims who would perform the pilgrimage after a ritual activity in the Ganting Grand Mosque. Because of its location adjacent to the Bayur Bay port, this mosque, which was then still a surau, became more crowded than usual during the hajj season as it was packed with hajj pilgrims.

At first, the shape of the mosque was made simple, with a wall made of wood and a roof made of pua leaves. In 1911, it was restored for the first time and one of the wall was replaced with rock using cement which was imported from Semen Padang (cement factory) in Indarung.

== See also ==
- Port of Teluk Bayur
