= Floating Mosque of Al-Aminah =

Mosque in Pesawaran, Lampung, Indonesia

Coordinates: 5.5565°S 105.2553°E

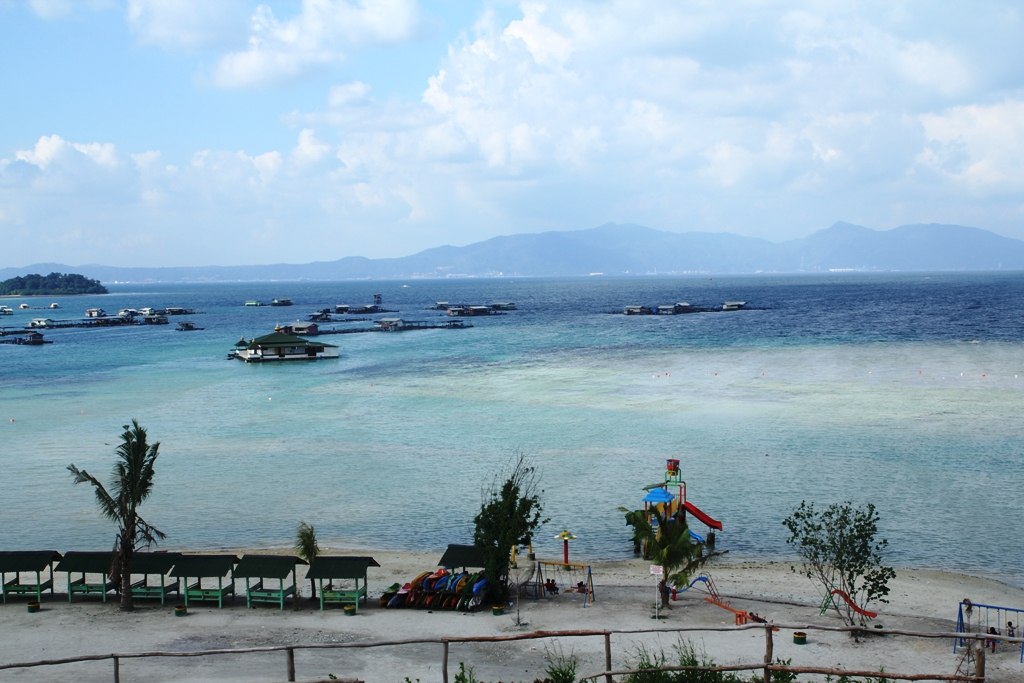
Terapung Al-Aminah Mosque seen on the center-left.

Al-Aminah Floating Mosque (Masjid Terapung Al-Aminah) is a mosque located 300 m (980 ft) from the coast of Sari Ringgung beach, Padang Cermin district, Pesawaran Regency, Lampung, Indonesia. The mosque is floating on water, supported by some buoys and anchors so as not to drift. It originally functioned as a facility for worshipping for fishermen who were still in the sea. Initial construction was in 2012. It was renovated in 2014 and inaugurated as a tourist attraction in Lampung in 2015 with the attendance of vice governor, Bachtiar Basri.
