= Mutaqaddimin Mosque =

Mosque in Lima Puluh Kota, West Sumatra, Indonesia

Mutaqaddimin Mosque Masjid Mutaqaddimin

Religion
- Affiliation: Islam
- Branch/tradition: Sunni

Location
- Location: Jorong Kapalo Tangah, Andaleh Nagari, Luhak District, Lima Puluh Kota Regency, West Sumatra, Indonesia
- Interactive map of Mutaqaddimin Mosque; Masjid Mutaqaddimin

Architecture
- Type: Mosque
- Groundbreaking: 1930

Specifications
- Length: 24 m
- Width: 18 m
- Dome: 2

Mutaqaddimin Mosque is an old mosque in Indonesia, located in Jorong Kapalo Tangah, Andaleh Nagari, Luhak District, Lima Puluh Kota Regency, West Sumatra. The mosque was built in 1930, making it the oldest mosque in Andaleh Nagari area.

The building of the mosque consists of main building and attached building, each crowned with a cupola. The mosque had ranked first for several times in the Assessment of Model Mosques on the district level conducted by the Ministry of Religious Affairs, as in 2009 and 2010, and in 2009 it also ranked third on the provincial level.

Currently, apart from being used for Islamic worshiping activities, the mosque of 24 × 18 meters is also used as a place for religious education for the surrounding community.

== History ==
The construction of the mosque was initiated by a number of ulamas (Muslim legal scholars) who joined the Ulama Union of Andaleh Nagari in 1930. Initially, the mosque was named Tuo Mosque due to the use of bamboo as its construction material. Previously, the local population had planned to use stone as a building material but was forced to use bamboo because Indonesia was still under the colonization of the Dutch East Indies at the time.

After the independence of Indonesia in 1945, construction of the mosque was again cultivated by the local population by proceeding to seek funding from the government, but this was in vain because of its isolated location. Therefore the mosque became increasingly obsolete, and it was forced to be torn down. Shortly after being torn down, one of the kings of Bodi people, Datuk Pangulu Basah, re-initiated the construction of the mosque by donating a plot of his property. Knowing this, the local community then formed a bond called the Association of Muslim Youth Andaleh, which aimed to bring back the establishment of the mosque. Approximately 15 years later the mosque was re-inaugurated, although until now the construction is still continuing due to lack of assistance from the government, and only by relying on support from neighboring communities and rantaus overseas.

== Environment ==
In the courtyard of the mosque, there is a gate made of concrete layered ceramic colored in dark and light red. Within the gateways, there is one-meter-long iron bar that serves as a fence. At the end of the gate, there is a green canopy connected directly to the main entrance. The canopy also serves as a protection for the ceramic floor from the sunlight and rain.
