= Nurul Hilal Dato Tiro Mosque =

Mosque in Bulukumba, South Sulawesi, Indonesia

Nurul Hilal Dato Tiro Mosque Masjid Nurul Hilal Dato Tiro

Religion
- Affiliation: Islam
- Branch/tradition: Sunni

Location
- Location: Bulukumba, South Sulawesi, Indonesia
- Interactive map of Nurul Hilal Dato Tiro Mosque; Masjid Nurul Hilal Dato Tiro

Architecture
- Type: Mosque
- Style: Javanese
- Completed: 1605

Specifications
- Minaret: 2
- Minaret height: 20 m

The Nurul Hilal Dato Tiro Mosque (Indonesian: Masjid Nurul Hilal Dato Tiro), formerly known as Hila-Hila Mosque, is a historical mosque in South Sulawesi, Indonesia. Constructed in 1605, the mosque is one of the oldest mosques in the archipelago.

== Description ==
Nurul Hilal Dato Tiro Mosque is located in the village of Ekatiro, Bonto Tiro District, which is about 36 km from the center of the city of Bulukumba.

The mosque was built in 1605 by Al Maulana Khatibu Bangsu, or Dato Tiro, who was a scholar from Minangkabau, West Sumatra who spread Islam in South Sulawesi. Today it is known as the oldest mosque in Bulukumba Regency. It has functioned as the center of the spread of Islam in South Sulawesi. The mosque was originally known as Hila-Hila Mosque. The mosque was renovated five times, first in 1625 and the latest in 1998. It was renamed Nurul Hilal Dato Tiro Mosque to honor Dato Tiro in 1997.

Architecturally, the mosque is known for the shape of the roof which was built in traditional Javanese architectural style. The roof is built of three levels and the window wall architecture is taken from the typical Torajan architecture of South Sulawesi such as Tongkonan.

The tomb of Dato Tiro is in the vicinity of the mosque. The site of the mosque has a well which was constructed by Dato Tiro as well. Originally, the well was used as a source of water for ablution.
