= Saka guru =

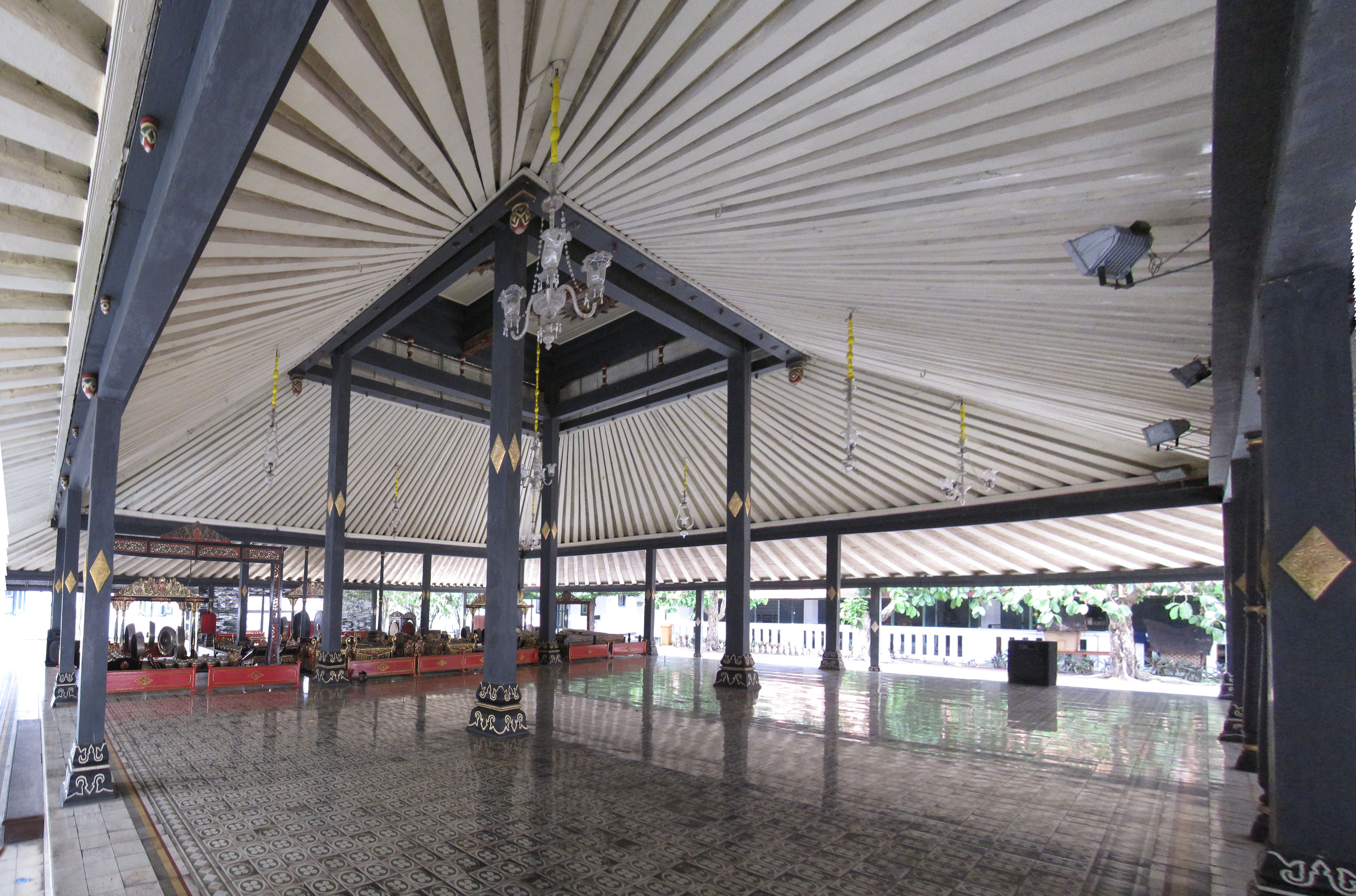
The saka guru of a pendopo in Kraton Yogyakarta.

Saka guru, or soko guru in Javanese, is the set of four main posts that support certain Javanese buildings, e.g. the pendopo, the house proper, and the mosque. The saka guru is the most fundamental element in Javanese architecture because it supports the entire roof of the building. Because of its importance, the saka guru is imbued with symbolism and treated with certain rituals.

== Structure and construction ==
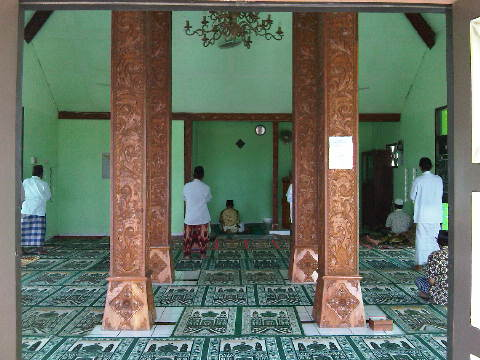
The saka guru of a Javanese mosque.

The saka guru construction is employed in buildings that are constructed with a joglo-type or tajug-type (pyramidal) roofs. The joglo-type roof is reserved for the houses of the nobility, while the tajug-type roof is used to support sacred buildings such as mosques or temples. In Javanese architecture, walls are merely boundaries of rooms and the exterior with no structural purposes. The main structural columns/posts of a Javanese house (the saka guru) support directly the roof and not the wall. Each of these four main posts sits on top of an umpak, a three-dimensional trapezoidal stone that acts as a transition between the post and the foundation. Umpak size varies from 20 x 20 cm^{2} to more than a square meter, depending on the dimension of the posts, which commonly ranges between 12 x 12 cm^{2} to 40 x 40 cm^{2}. Umpak prevents the wooden post from the infiltration of groundwater and reduces the horizontal forces caused by earthquakes.

During the construction of the saka guru, the northeast umpak is the first stone to be placed on site. This umpak is designed to look like the padma flower, imbuing it with the quality of strength. The next umpak to be placed is the southeast umpak, followed by the northwest, and finally the southwest. The wooden posts are always placed according to the direction of tree growth. After the saka guru is completely erected, in the evening an offering ceremony is held.

Each wooden post of the saka guru has pens at both ends; the bottom pen fixes the post into the umpak; the top pen (purus pathok (the pile pen)) plugs into the hole of the two main beams. The first beam to be set is the pengeret (literally "cross beam"), then the second beam blandar (literally "beam") is set on top of the pengeret. The two beams lock together, receiving compression forces of the saka guru structure.

Each wooden post of the saka guru also contains a hole at the upper portion, to be filled by the pen of secondary beams. The first beam is known as sunduk ("skewer") which also contains a pen known as purus wedokan ("female pen"). The pen purus wedokan contains a hole that will be locked by a pen of a second beam after it is inserted into the saka guru. The second beam is known as kili ("anchor"), while its pen is known as purus lanang ("male pen"). The structural element of kili and sunduk stabilizes the saka guru structure. The Javanese term for pen is purus meaning the male sex organ.

Upon the completion of all the plug-in procedures, the saka guru is stable and can support the roof on top of it. Two or three parallel beams join the post at its top. The posts may directly support roof trusses or roof beams. In the case of joglo, the main posts are usually topped by two sets of inward-stepped wooden piles, tumpang sari, and outward-stepped piles, elar. The number of steps in a tumpang sari reveals the status of the owner.

The usur-duduk is a hip rafter running from an external corner to the ridge that is traditionally called molo.

== Symbolism ==
Saka guru consists of the word saka and guru. According to the Javanese text of Kawruh Kalang, the guru or "teacher" is a title given to the four wooden beams, while saka or "post" is for the four main posts. Thus the whole configuration is known as sakaguru, or more correctly sakaning guru or saka ingkang nyanggi guru (Javanese "the saka which supports the guru).

In the Indonesian language, the term saka guru is used to signify a fundamental principle. For example, "the Indonesian Cooperative is the saka guru of the National Economy".

== Other rituals ==
The space beneath the saka guru was considered a very important sacred space. In the modern day, the area has no specific usage, but traditionally, this area was where incense was burnt once a week to honor the rice Goddess, Dewi Sri. The space below the tumpang sari is also the place where the bride and bridegroom are seated during their marriage ceremony.

== See also ==
- Javanese culture
- Javanese traditional house
- Kejawèn
- Kraton Ngayogyakarta Hadiningrat
- Pendopo
