= Kalang house =

Term used to refer to eclectic Javanese houses of the Kalang people

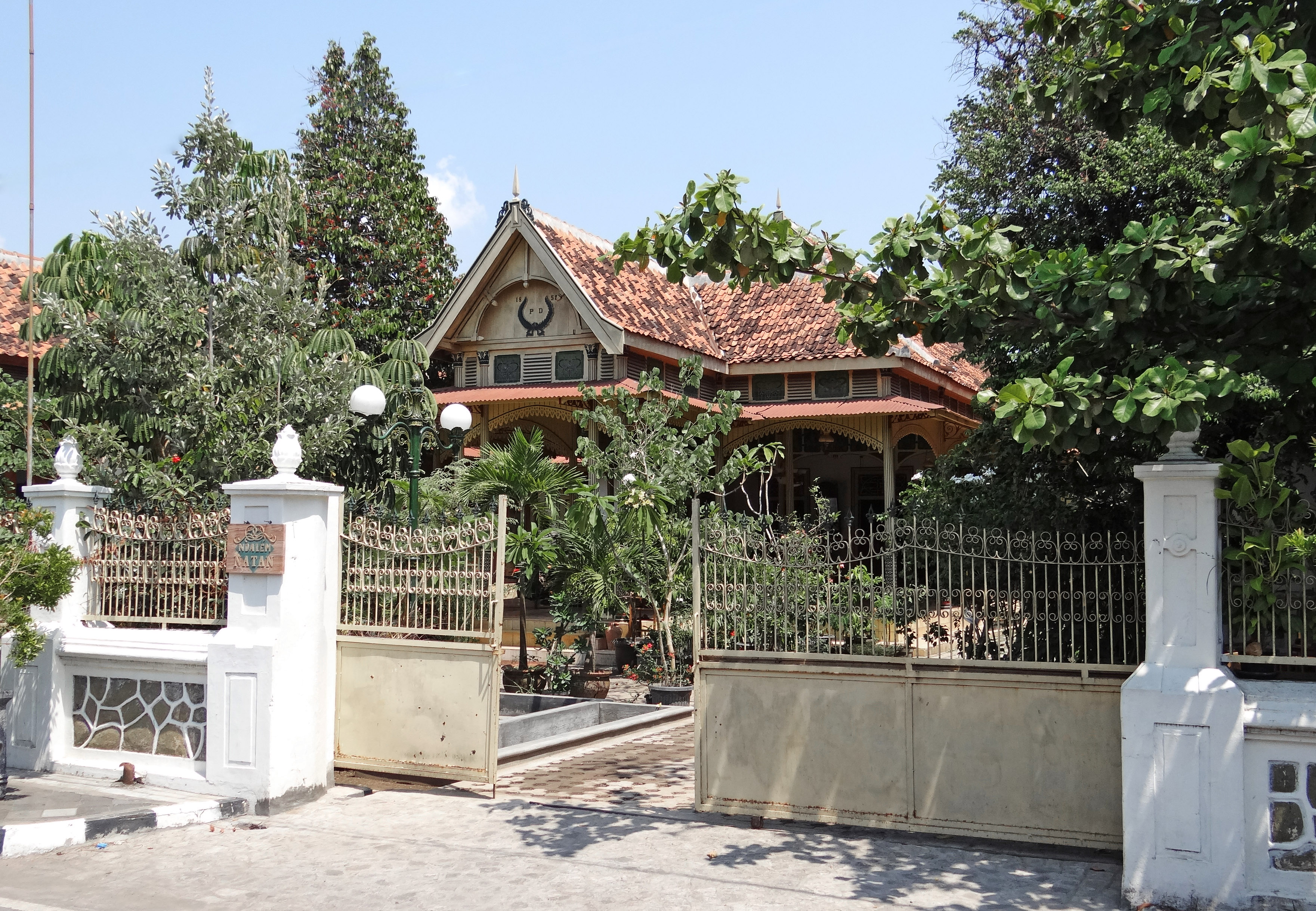
A well-preserved mid 19th-century kalang house Omah Prayadranan or Ndalem Natan in Kotagede.

Kalang house (Javanese: ꦲꦺꦴꦩꦃꦏꦭꦁ, Omah Kalang, Indonesian Rumah Kalang) is a term used to refer to eclectic Javanese houses of the Kalang people. The enclave of Kalang people is found in Kotagede, Yogyakarta and Surakarta. The kalang houses, built at the turn of the 20th-century, are usually grand-sized and heavily ornamented houses with an eclectic mixture of Javanese traditional principle and Western Romanticism. The Kalang house has become a cultural identity of the Kalang people and the city of Kotagede where most of the houses are still in good condition.

== Kalang people ==
Kalang houses are related with the growth of the Kalang people community in Kotagede. Kalang literally means "enclosed" or "fenced". Kalang people, or Wong Kalang, were a group of merchants who made settlement in the District of Kotagede. Even though the kalang people originally came from East Java and Bali, they are presumed to be the natives of Kotagede, which was the former capital of the Hindu Mataram Kingdom. Kalang people, known for their artistic skills in carving wood and gold, moved to Kotagede when Mataram needed skilled laborers and builders.

Local legends say that the Kalang People were originally war captives brought back by Sultan Agung from his unsuccessful expedition to Bali in the early 17th-century. Legend said that the Kalangs were the result of the union between an ape and a princess, and so the Kalang people were rumored to possess ape-like tails and untamed supernatural power. Until the 1920s, they were concentrated in the neighborhood of Tegalgendu on the west bank of the Gajah Wong River and were not allowed to reside in Kotagede proper. Their name "Wong Kalang" is probably derived from their peculiar, Hindu-Balinese type ritual, obong kalang. Obong kalang was a funeral ritual in which a paper figure representing the deceased person was "cremated" at intervals indicated by the Hindu-Balinese calendar while the actual corpse was buried in the ground, following Muslim practice. As their professed religion, they followed Islam, but the Wong Kalang practiced many other customs, which looked strange to native Kotagedeans.

Kalang people were also noted for endogamy. Many marriages between cousins, including first cousins, occurred in Kalang society. Sometimes the Kalang People in Tegalgendu exchanged marriage partners with other Kalang groups living in similar ghetto-like settlements in various places of Central and East Java.

In the late 19th-century, the Kalang people achieved a lot of advantages, especially with the improvement of transportation and monetization of the agricultural economy. Free of the Javanese value of harmony and the Islamic value of restrained economic greed (especially in taking interest of money lending), the Kalang people were able to collect great fortune from various trades, money lending and pawnshops. Before the administrative reform of the early 1920s there were two subgroups among the Kalang People of Tegalgendu: one belonging to the Surakarta Sunanate and other to the Yogyakarta Sultanate. The head of the Surakarta subgroup was given the title of mantri kalang, whose duty was to supervise carpentry services for the repair of buildings in the Royal Cemetery complex. The Yogyakarta subgroup specialized in transporting goods between the port town of Semarang and Yogyakarta, a task which was granted by the Yogyakarta court solely to this subgroup. Sometime around the turn of the century, the Surakarta subgroup obtained a license from the court to open pawnshops throughout the territory. Within a short period, they developed an extensive network of pawnshops bringing in a huge amount of profit. The Yogyakarta subgroup continued to specialize in the transportation of goods utilizing all available means — trains, motor vehicles, and horses. The "monopoly" of these royal tasks allow the Kalang group to accumulate great wealth. The Kalang people were remembered to have been the first natives to be able to acquired Rolls-Royces when they were imported to Java.

It is said that one of the reason why the royal court gave the Kalang People a special role in the royal services is because of the court's disfavor on the entry of the Chinese and other foreign Orientals into their territories.

== The Kalang houses ==
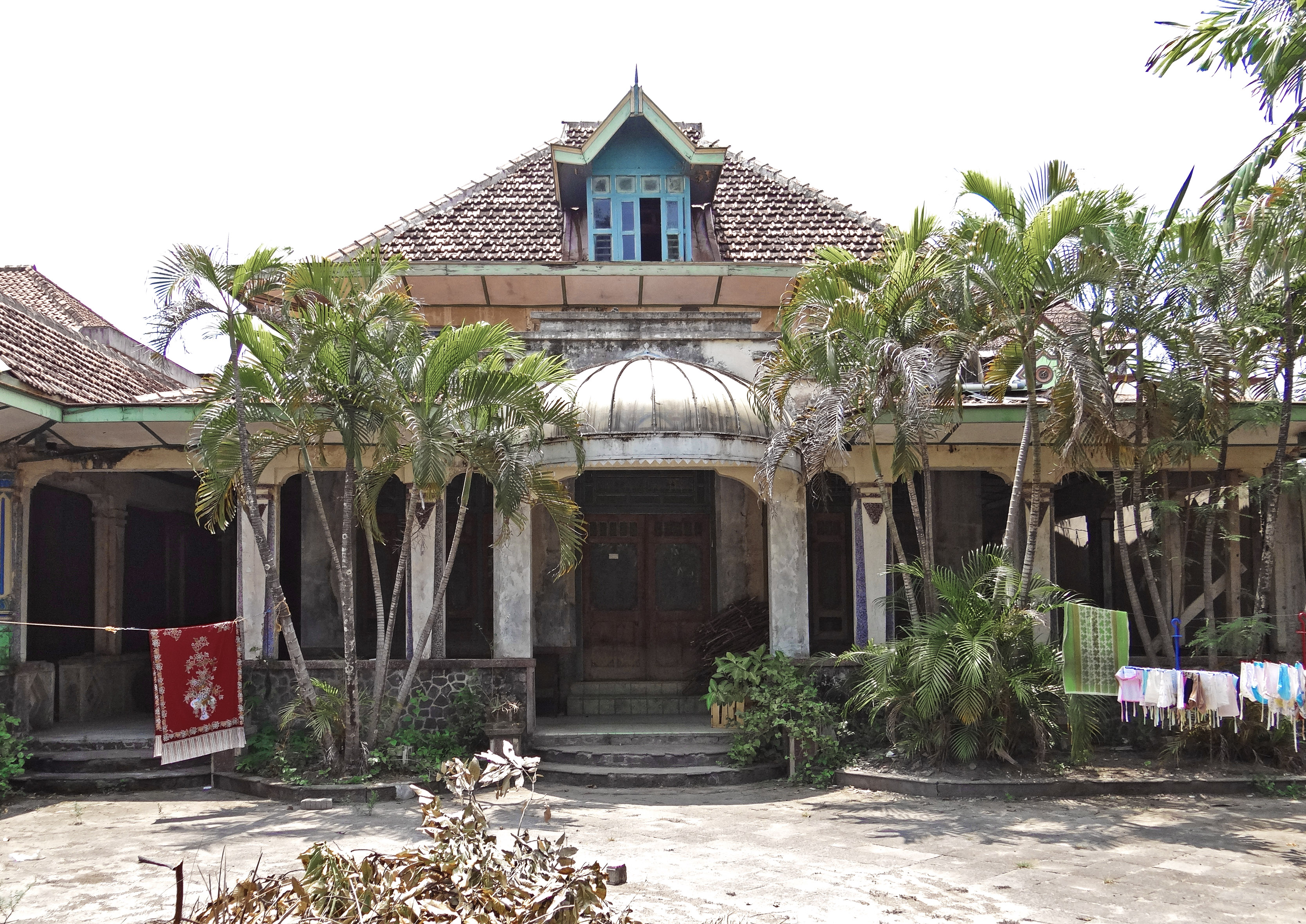
The enclosed pendopo of the kalang house of B.H. Noeriah (1862) in Kotagede, Yogyakarta.

The wealth of the Kalang People is visible in the architecture of their palace-like houses. One of these houses, built in 1926 on the east bank of the Gajah Wong River, has two garages for eight sedans and a stable for twenty horses, besides an extremely extensive and grand main building with many wings. Most Kalang houses are located in Jalan Mondorokan and are usually constructed between 1850s and 1920s.

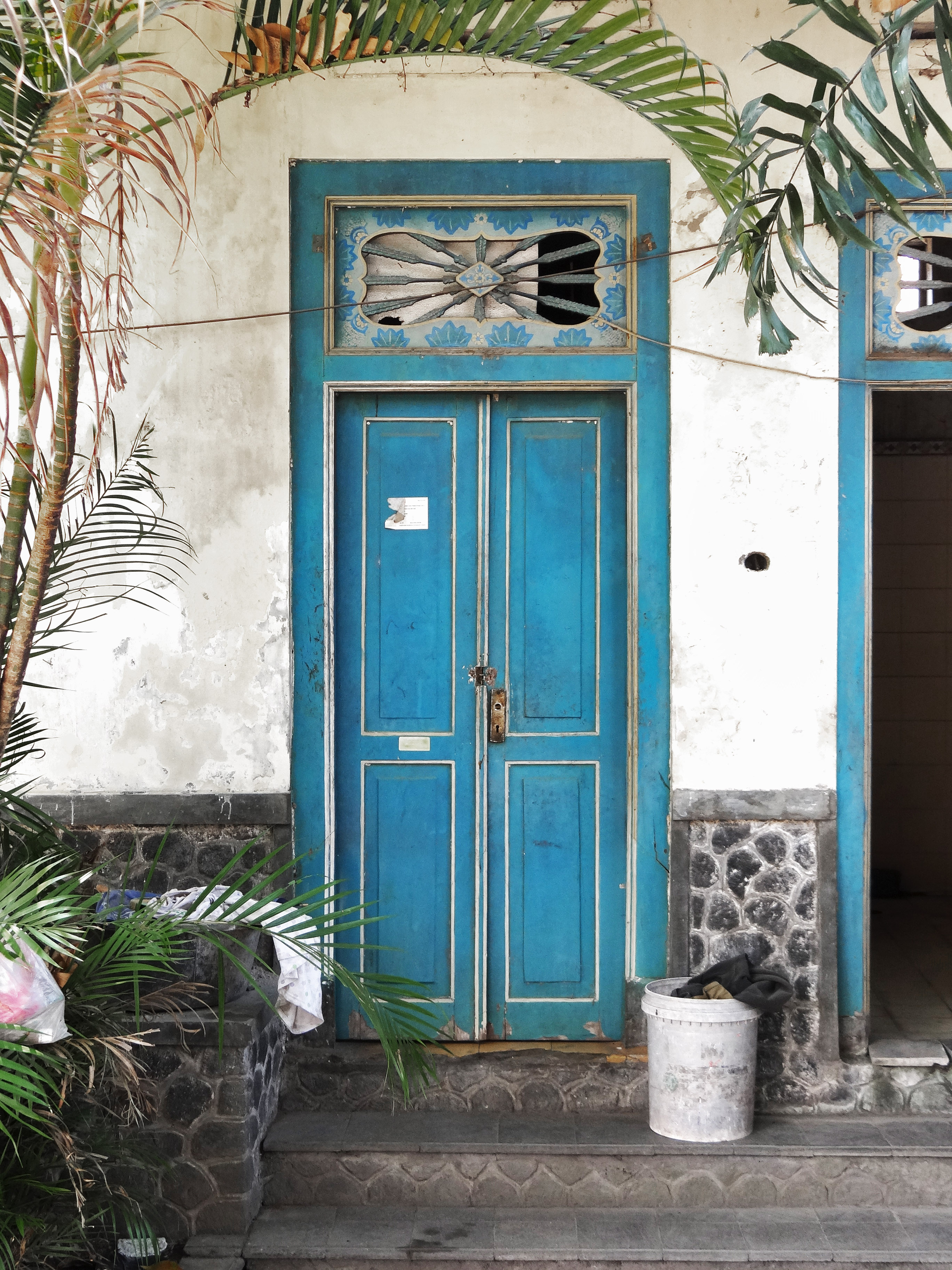
Ornate door of the kalang house of B.H. Noeriah showing fine wooden carving in Javanese style.

The architecture of Kalang houses fuses the Javanese traditional houses with western Romanticism. Room layout still follows the principle of a traditional Javanese house e.g. the presence of a pendopo (guest-receiving pavilion) and the traditional layout of the main building e.g. dalem, senthong, pringgitan, etc. In terms of decoration, the kalang house is heavily ornamented with complex decorations inspired by Western romanticism. Other features of Kalang houses are overhanging eaves, prominent front-facing gables, heavy use of stained glass, different textures using patterned wood shingles or terra cotta tiles and complex-shaped balustrades.

Another similarity to the Javanese traditional house is the north-south axis of the kalang house, however the emphasis is more on practicality instead of traditional ritual. Room layout is similar to a traditional Javanese house but the use can be different. Wayang is performed in the peringgitan of a traditional Javanese house, but not in a Kalang house. The central senthong, a sacred space for rice goddess Sri in the Javanese house, has been transformed into the a sleeping room.

The pendopo of a Kalang house is still kept as the reception area of the house. However, instead of employing a traditional joglo-styled roof typical of a traditional pendopo, the roof often employs additional front-facing gable, marking the front-center part of the pendopo. Omah Prayadranan or Ndalem Natan (1857 or 1927) in Kotagede, and a Kalang house in Jalan Slamet Riyadi, Surakarta, employs a porch-like protrusion to the pendopo, known as the kuncungan. The kuncungan of a Kalang house in Jalan Urip Sumoharjo, Surakarta has transformed into a porte-cochère while the pendopo took form of a terrace. The kalang house of B.H. Noeriah, or Omah Tembong (1862) has been completely enclosed with wall, stained glassed windows and door, giving it a quality of a sunroom.

Various element of a traditional Javanese house is made more grandeur in a Kalang house. A Kalang house in Jalan Urip Sumoharjo Surakarta transformed its 'gandok' (additional side structure) into a detached side pavilion.

== Sample of Kalang houses ==
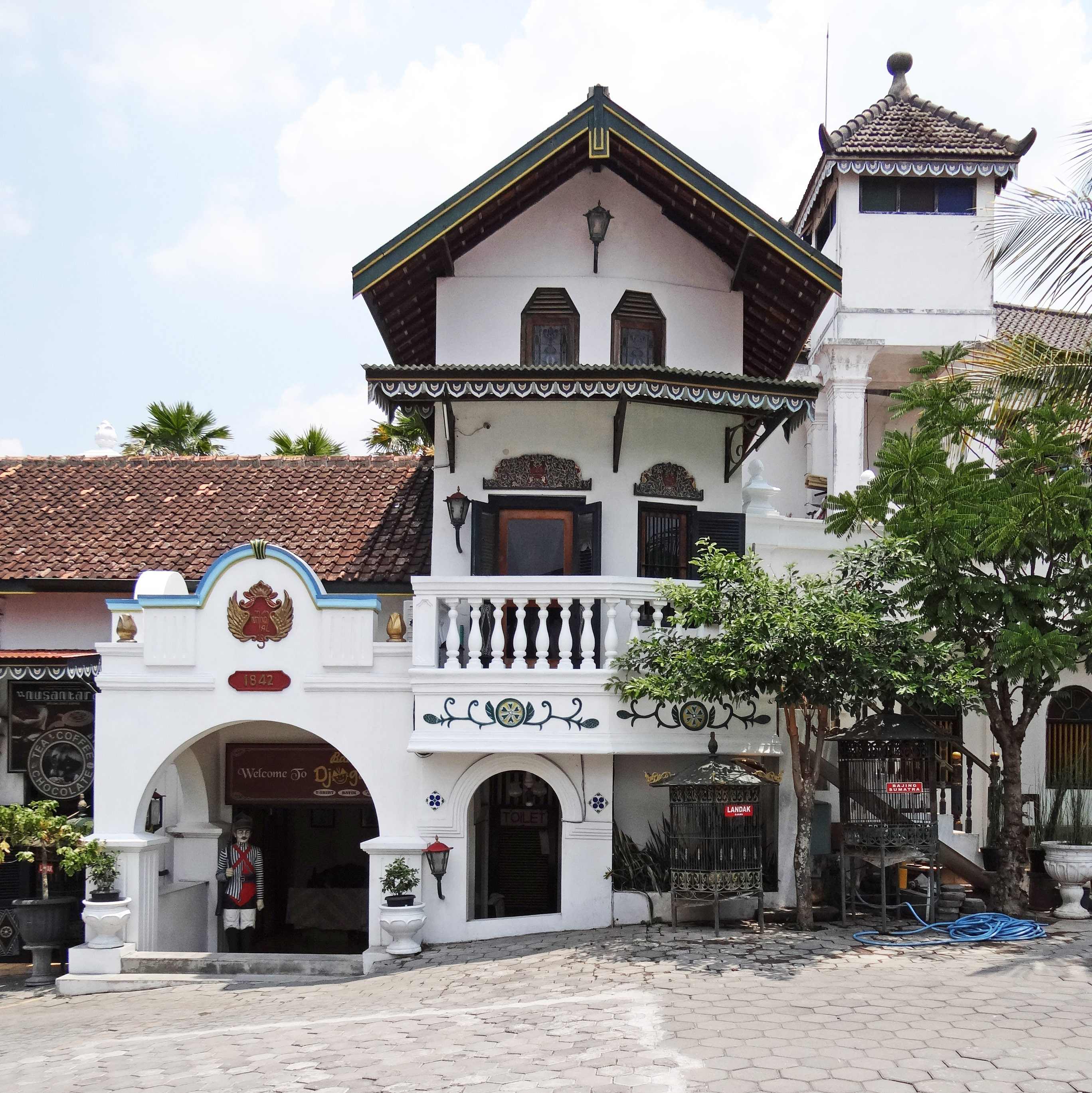
The (right) side building of Ansor's Silver.

Below is a list of kalang houses found in Kotagede and Surakarta.

- Anshor's Silver, Kotagede
- Kalang house in Jalan Slamet Riyadi, Surakarta (1915)
- Rumah Pesik, Kotagede (1920)
- Kalang house in Jalan Urip Sumoharjo, Surakarta (1927 renovated)
- Kalang house of B.H. Noeriah, or Omah Tembong (1862)
- Omah Dhuwur, Kotagede
- Omah Prayadranan, or Ndalem Natan, Kotagede (1857, 1927 renovated)

== See also ==
- Javanese traditional house

== Works cited ==
- Nakamura, Mitsuo (2012). The Crescent Arises Over the Banyan Tree: A Study of the Muhammadiyah Movement in a Central Javanese Town, C. 1910-2010 (2nd, enlarged ed.). Singapore: Institute of Southeast Asian Studies. ISBN 9789814311915.
- Revianto Budi Santosa (2007). Kotagede: Life Between Walls. Jakarta: Gramedia Pustaka Utama. ISBN 9789792225471.
- Santoso, Eddy Imam (2012). "Perubahan Fungsi Ruang dan Struktur Dinding 'Rumah Kalang'" [The changes of the room function and wall structure of a Rumah Kalang]. Indonesian Green Technology Journal (in Indonesian). 1 (3). eISSN 2338-1787. Archived from the original on November 14, 2016.
- Santoso, Suwito; Pringgoharjono, Kestity (2006). The Centhini Story: The Javanese Journey of Life : Based on the Original Serat Centhini (illustrated ed.). Singapore: Marshall Cavendish. ISBN 9789812329752.
