= Pendhapa =

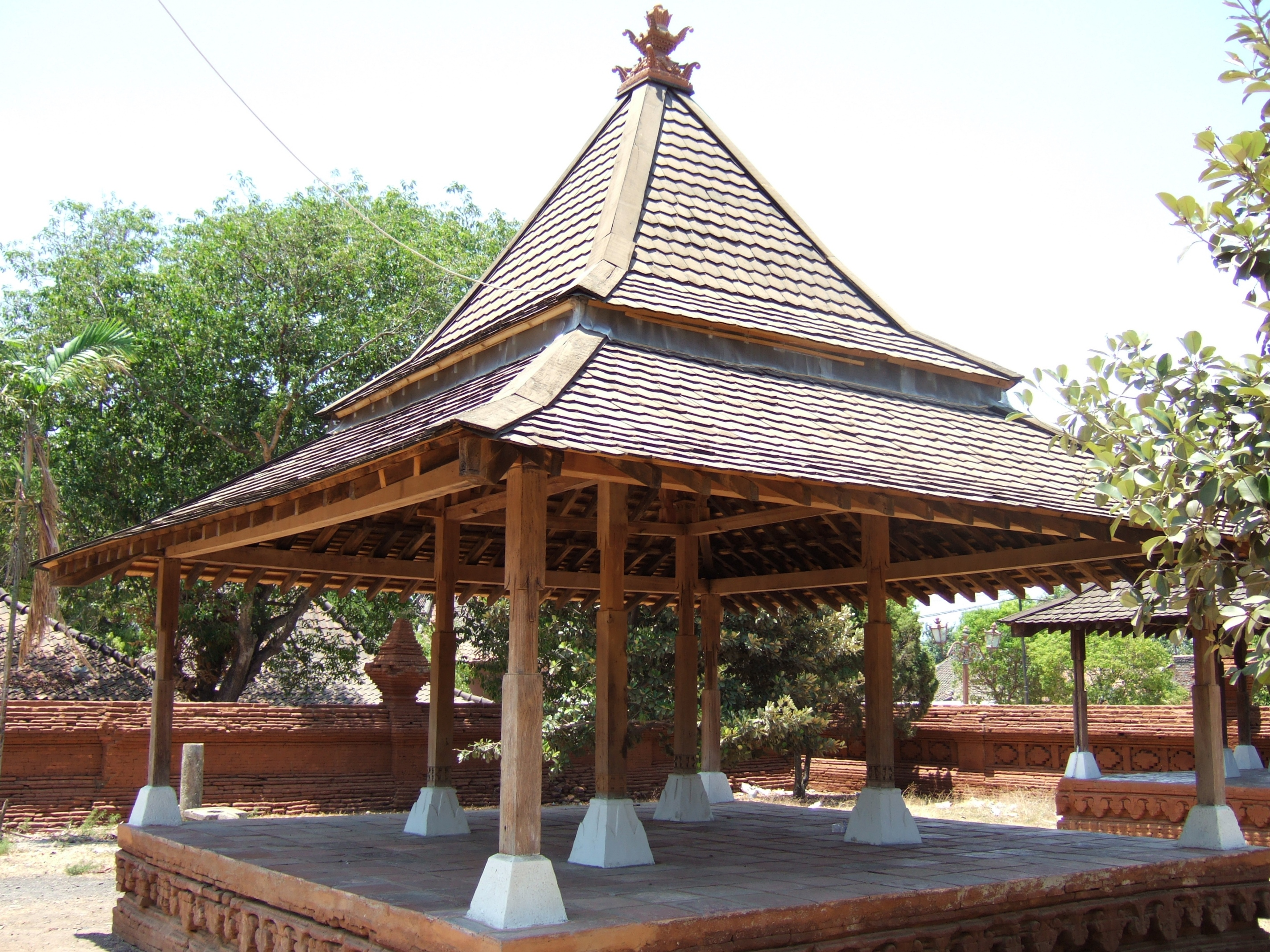
Pendhapa in Kraton Kasepuhan, Cirebon

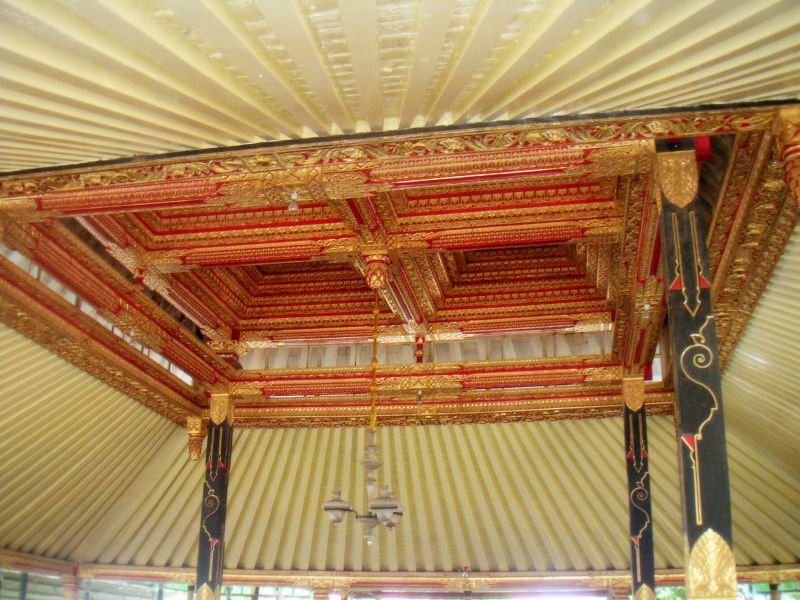
Tumpangan ceiling within a pendhapa

A pendhapa or pandhapa (Javanese: ꦥꦼꦤ꧀ꦝꦥ or ꦥꦤ꧀ꦝꦥ, Indonesian spelling: pendapa, nonstandard spelling: pendopo or pěndåpå) is a fundamental element of Javanese architecture unique in the southern central part of Java; a large pavilion-like structure built on columns. Either square or rectangular in plan, it is open on all sides and provides shelter from the sun and rain, but allows breeze and indirect light. The word pendhapa is cognate to the Sanskrit word mandapa ("hall").

The Dutch writer, Multatuli, in his colonial reformist novel, Max Havelaar, described the pendhapa thus: "After a broad-brimmed hat, an umbrella, or a hollow tree, a 'pendoppo' [sic] is certainly the most simple representation of the idea 'roof'."

Derived from ancient Javanese architectural elements, pendhapa are common ritual spaces primarily intended for ceremonies and also for purposes such as receiving guests in the compounds of wealthy Javanese and even as cottage industry work spaces. Pendhapa is constructed as a stand-alone structure or, attached to a walled inner structure (dalem), may form the front part of a traditional Javanese house (omah).

== History ==
The oldest surviving images of ancient Javan vernacular architecture appear in Borobudur reliefs, among others the stepped roof type pendhapa. They once sheltered the institutions of ancient Javanese kingdoms, such as law courts, clergy, and palaces, and for public appearances of the king and his ministers. In the 9th century Ratu Boko complex near Prambanan, there is traces of square elevated stone bases with umpaks, and stones with holes to put wooden pillars on it. Similar structures also can be found in 14th century Trowulan dated from Majapahit era, where square brick bases with umpak stones suggest that some pendopos once stood there. Because the pillars and the roof were made from wooden organic material, no trace of the pendhapa roof remains. The pendhapa with faithful Majapahit brick-base style can be found in 16th-century Kraton Kasepuhan, Cirebon, as well as 17th-century Kota Gede, Yogyakarta. This evidence suggests that the design has not changed much for over a millennium.

They remain fundamental components of Javanese kraton ('palaces'), with European influences often being incorporated since the 18th century. The majority of pendhapa are constructed from timber but masonry versions are in existence such as in the Kraton Kanoman in Cirebon. Wealthy modern day home builders, in attempting to design homes that draw on traditional Javanese experience of space, have dismantled, transported and re-assembled pendhapa to form modern-traditional hybrid homes. The pendhapa is used as a batik making place for women.

== See also ==
- Javanese culture
- Kejawèn
- Joglo
- Indonesian architecture
- Kraton
- Zayat
