= Kotagede =

Historic neighborhood in Yogyakarta, Indonesia

Kotagede ꦏꦸꦛꦒꦼꦝꦺ
- Kemantren
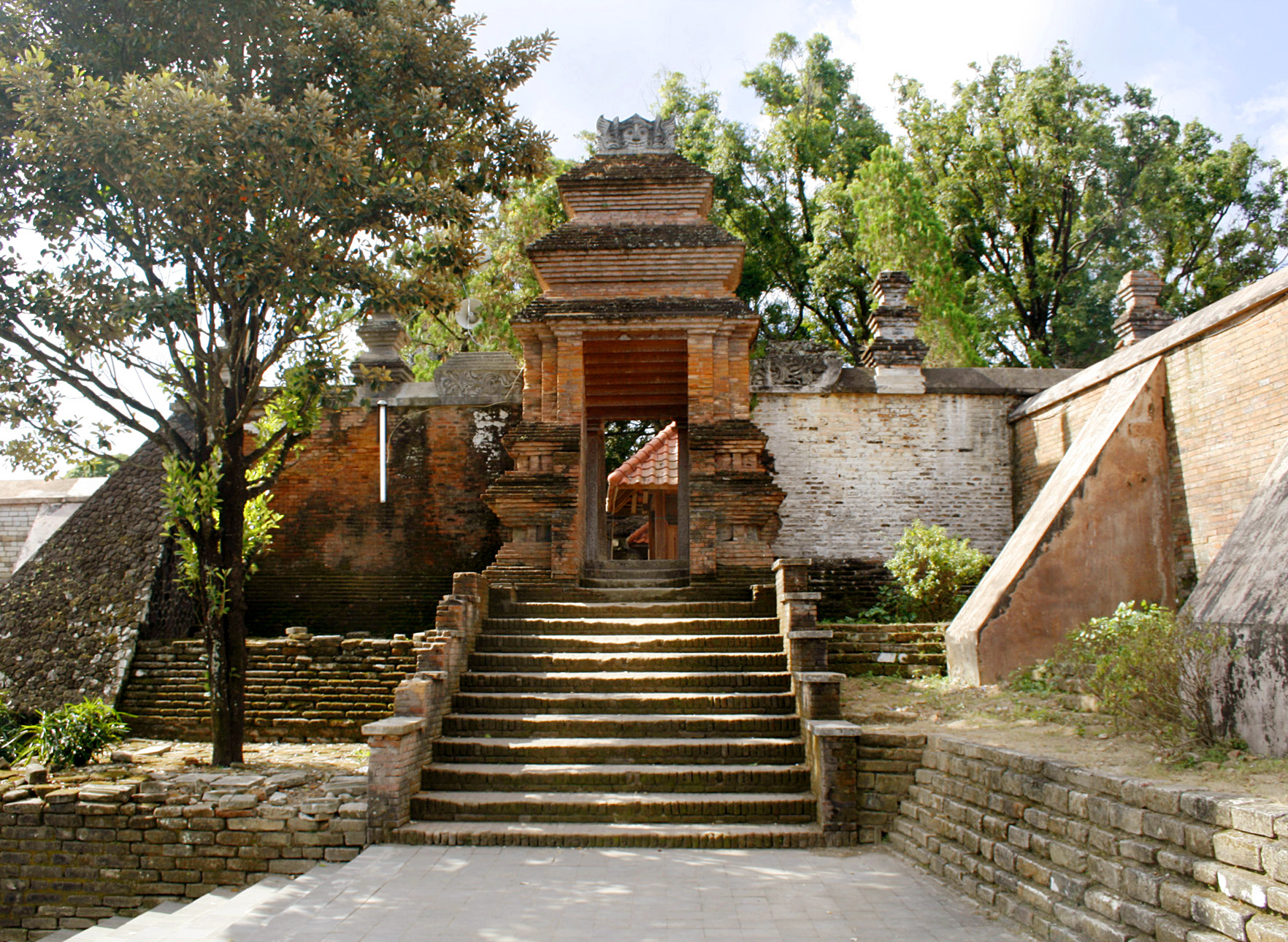
- Gate into the great mosque and the royal cemetery

- Location in the city of Yogyakarta, Java and Indonesia Kotagede ꦏꦸꦛꦒꦼꦝꦺ (Java) Kotagede ꦏꦸꦛꦒꦼꦝꦺ (Indonesia)
- Coordinates: 7.817864844308277°S 110.39541083540836°E
- Country: Indonesia
- Region: Java
- Province: Special Region of Yogyakarta
- City: Yogyakarta
- Time zone: UTC+7 (IWST)
- Postcodes: 55171 to 55173
- Area code: (+62) 274
- Vehicle registration: AB
- Villages: 3
- Website: kotagedekec.jogjakota.go.id

Kotagede (Javanese: ꦏꦸꦛꦒꦼꦝꦺ, romanized: Kuthagedhé) is a city district (kemantren) and a historic neighborhood in Yogyakarta, Special Region of Yogyakarta, Indonesia. Kotagede contains the remains of the first capital of Mataram Sultanate, established in the 16th century. Some of the remains of the old Kotagede are remains of the palace, the royal cemetery, the royal mosque, and defensive walls and moats. Kotagede is well known internationally for its silver crafting.

== History ==
=== Royal city and pilgrimages ===
Kotagede was previously a forest named Mentaok, to the east of Gajah Wong River. During the last quarter of the 16th century, the ruler of the Islamic Kingdom of Pajang, about 100 kilometers to the east of this site, awarded the forest to Ki Ageng Pemanahan, one of his courtiers who successfully put down a rebellion. Pemanahan opened the forest with his son Danang Sutawijaya, who was also an adoptive son of the ruler. A settlement was established and was named Mataram as Pemanahan himself was called Ki Gedhe Mataram, "the Lord of Mataram".

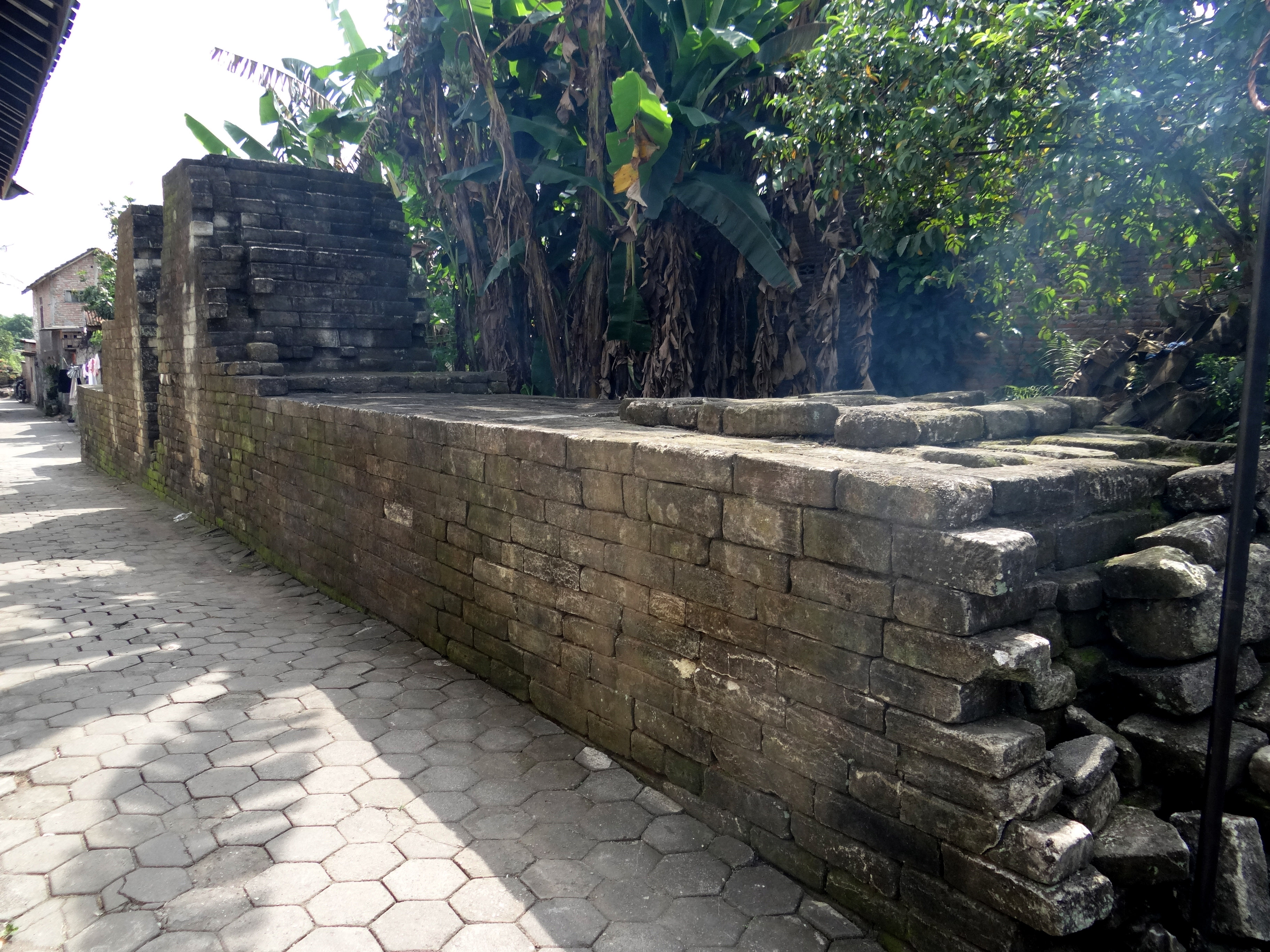
Ruins of the inner wall of Kotagede.

After Pemanahan died in 1575, Danang Sutawijaya announced himself, king of Mataram, with the title of Panembahan Senapati Ingalaga, "the Lord to Whom Obeisance is Paid, Commander in the Battlefield". He expanded his territory by conquering some major parts of Java, including Pajang, the capital of his adoptive father. The small town became the capital of Mataram and perhaps since then it was dubbed Kotagede, "Great City". During this time the town was fortified with walls. The western wall was built along the Gajah Wong River, channeled to water the moats on three other sides of the fort.

To successfully govern a territory, Senapati also established an alliance with supernatural power by performing austere meditation. According to Babad Mangkubumi, while performing a meditation on a stone in the middle of a river in between Mount Merapi and the Indian Ocean, a gigantic mythical fish named Tunggulwulung offered Senapati a ride to venture south of the ocean where the most powerful spirit of Java governed the netherworld, named Kangjeng Ratu Kidul. Overwhelmed by the aura of Senapati, the queen offered support for his great efforts to conquer the people of Java. She even presented herself to be his consort, as well as to all his reigning descendants, up to the present.

A prince named Mas Jolang succeeded Senapati in 1601. During his 12 years of reign, he carried out many construction projects within the palace and the surrounding area, the most important building he constructed in the palace was Prabayeksa. Archeologist Willem Frederik Stutterheim notes the importance of this central building since the pre-Islamic Majapahit. In the contemporary palace of Yogyakarta, this name refers to a gigantic fully enclosed wooden building serving as the inner sanctum of this kingly abode where most magically charged heirlooms and weapons are stored.

Jolang initiated the construction of several Taman (enclosed pleasure gardens). He was remembered in his posthumous name as Panembahan Seda Krapyak ("Lord Who Died during Hunting (in Hunting Lodge)") because he was reputedly killed by a deer while hunting in his krapyak (enclosed hunting forest).

Jolang's successor to the throne was Mas Rangsang (rule 1613-1645) better known as Sultan Agung Hanyakrakusuma, "The Great Sultan, Ruler of the Universe". He expanded his territory to include Central and East Java. He attacked Batavia twice although to no avail. Sultan Agung decided to leave Kotagede to a place called Kerta, about 5 km south of Kotagede, while initiating the construction of a new capital with much greater walls nearby named Plered.

The capital of Mataram moved several times afterward only to return later to a location near Kotagede. From Kerta it was relocated to Plered by Agung's son, Mangkurat I. Only one generation settled in Plered before the fall of this city after being defeated by some contenders of Mangkurat I in 1677.

After the rebellion had been put down, his successor Mangkurat II, decided to establish a new capital named Kartasura 50 km to the east. The Chinese massacre in Batavia turned into turmoil in many major parts of Java during the first half of the 18th century. The rebel leader, Sunan Kuning, occupied the throne of Mataram in Kartasura after Pakubawana II had left the capital in defeat. Pakubuwana II later regained his kingdom, but the throne had been tarnished, and so a new palace had to be established to have a purified center. In 1745, he created a new place which became the heart of the city of Surakarta.

Unlike many other parts of Java, some ancestral lands including Kotagede were indivisible because they were regarded as a kind of heirloom rather than measurable territory. The cemetery and mosque were guarded by officials from both courts and the surrounding lands were assigned as appanage to sustain the life of these officials. As the political power shifted, Kotagede became principally a pilgrimage town with its royal mausoleum and other sites associated with the initial establishment of the Mataram kingdom.

=== Colonial era ===
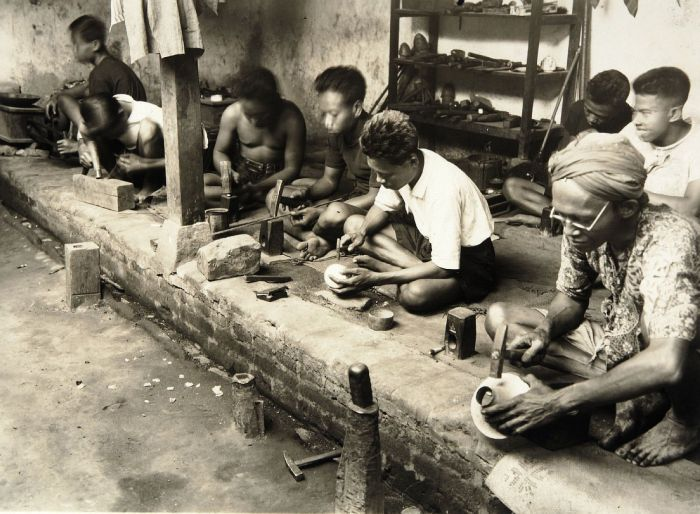
Silversmiths of Kotagede in the 1930s.

By the end of the 19th century, transportation and monetization of the agricultural economy improved. Kotagede's merchants prospered during this era. Walled merchant houses called Kalang houses appeared during this era, constructed in thick masonry walls to protect the accumulated possessions. These traditional merchant houses sometimes combine elements from Dutch architecture which was considered luxurious, producing eclectic architecture. Silverware flourished during this era.

=== Religious reform ===
Islamic reform emerged during the first quarter of the 20th century. Some local religious leaders established a religious organization named Syarikatul Mubtadi (The Union of the Beginners) intended to educate the people of Kotagede about the "true" Islamic ways of life. This initial movement grew much more expensive with the introduction of Muhammadiyah, a Yogyakarta-based Islamic reform organization. This reform aims to introduce rationality and Islamic teaching to the society of Kotagede, which is considered to be superstitious. Masjid Perak (Kotagede Silver Mosque) was constructed in 1940 on the major streets of Kotagede.

=== Present ===
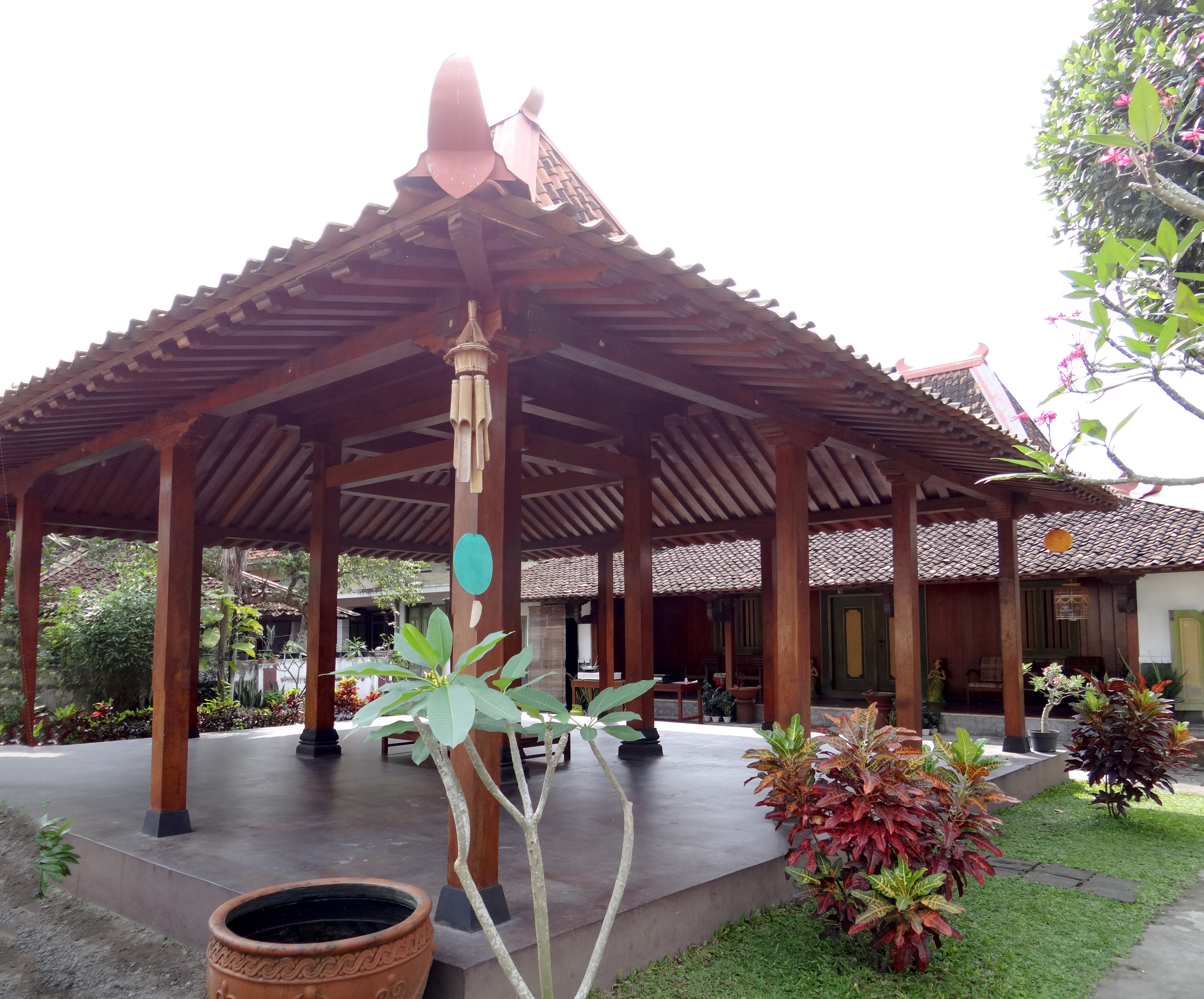
A joglo of the Omah UGM, one of the restored joglo in Kotagede after the 2006 Yogyakarta earthquake.

Indonesia experienced "tourism booming" at the beginning of the 1970s and it had a positive influence on Kotagede. Several old houses were developed as craft showrooms and restaurants. Ruins are preserved.

Many old buildings in Kotagede were destroyed following the 2006 Yogyakarta earthquake. A revitalization program of Kotagede was initiated by Pusaka Jogja Bangkit! ("Yogyakarta Heritage Revival!"). Collaborative parties consist of the Jogja Heritage Society, the Center for Heritage Conservation, the Department of Architecture and Planning at Gajah Mada University, the Indonesian Network for Heritage Conservation, ICOMOS Indonesia, and other supporting institutions including the local community.

Today, Kotagede is still considered the site of origin with supernatural power being the focus of ancestral blessings and prosperity.

== Administration ==
Administratively, the Kotagede area is divided into three villages (Kelurahans): Prenggan, Purbayan, and Rejowinangun which together form Kotagede District (kecamatan) within the City of Yogyakarta. Externally, Jagalan belongs to the adjoining Banguntapan District (kecamatan) which is within Bantul Regency.

== Town planning ==
The original town planning of Kotagede was similar to the Majapahit town planning: a fourfold configuration of Mosque-Palace-Market-Square called catur gatra tunggal, surrounded by defensive walls: cepuri (inner wall) and baluwerti (outer wall). The Market and Square were primarily open spaces, while the Mosque and Palace were walled compounds each containing many buildings. The town is more accurately described as a city palace.

There are very few physical remains of the palace and city. Parts that have survived include the Kotagede ancient great mosque, the royal cemetery (precursor to Imogiri), and some sections of the original city walls. The great mosque and the royal cemetery are now located in an area called Dondongan.

Toponyms indicate many traces of the initial urban planning of the town. A neighborhood called Alun-alun is situated to the south of the market, right in front of the great mosque. A place called Dalem (inner house) signifies its former designation as the residence of the ruler.

=== Kedhaton (the royal palace) ===
The Kedhaton, (also Kedaton), or "royal palace", existed on the site in 1509. Nowadays, the only remains of the royal palace are three stones, each called batu gilang ("glittering stone"), batu gatheng ("gatheng (stone-throwing game) stone"), and batu genthong ("water barrel stone"). At present, the stones are protected inside a small building, located in the middle of the road and surrounded by three banyan trees.

Batu gilang (also watu gilang) is a square-shaped black slab of stone believed to be the stone where Panembahan Senopati rested. Inscribed circularly on it are the words: "So Goes the World", each in Latin, French, Dutch, and Italian: Ita movetur Mundus - Ainsi va le Monde - Zoo gaat de wereld - Cosi va il Mondo. On the outside, the Latin words in the circle say: AD AETERNAM MEMORIAM INFELICIS - INFORTUNA CONSORTES DIGNI VALETE QUID STUPEARIS INSANI VIDETE IGNARI ET RIDETE, CONTEMNITE VOS CONTEMTU VERE DIGNI - IGM (In Glorium Maximam).

Batu gatheng (also watu cantheng) are three pale yellowish stone balls of different sizes placed on a stone slab. These balls are believed by the locals to be the playing stones of Raden Rongo, the son of Panembahan Senapati. Others claim that the stones are cannonballs.

Batu genthong is believed to be the stone for containing the water used for Islamic ritual ablution. It is used by royal advisors of Panembahan Senopati: Ki Juru Mertani and Ki Ageng Giring.

=== Masjid gede (the great mosque) ===
The great mosque (Masjid gede) of Kotagede is the largest monument attributed to the kingdom of Mataram, therefore it is nowadays called the Mataram Mosque. The mosque was first established in 1575, the death year of Ki Ageng Pemanahan. The first major rebuilding was carried out during the reign of Sultan Agung to honor his ancestors. Rulers of Mataram, Surakarta, and Yogyakarta conducted several rehabilitation later on. The last major rebuilding was performed in 1926 under the order of Sunan Pakubuwana X after this mosque had caught on fire.

The mosque was built in traditional Javanese architecture. It consists of a pair of buildings: the main prayer hall and a front hall commonly called serambi. The prayer hall is a building of thick plain walls, while the serambi is a porch-like semi-attached building. Surrounding the porch is a moat to enable one to dip his or her feet before reaching the serambi, symbolically purifying anything that enters the mosque.

The mosque is situated right to the east of the royal cemetery. The mosque area is a vast yard of sawo kecik (Manilkara kauki) trees, the two main buildings cover less than one-tenth of the entire area.

A gate separates the great mosque and the royal cemetery complex. The area before the gate is called the Sendang Seliran complex.

=== Royal cemetery ===
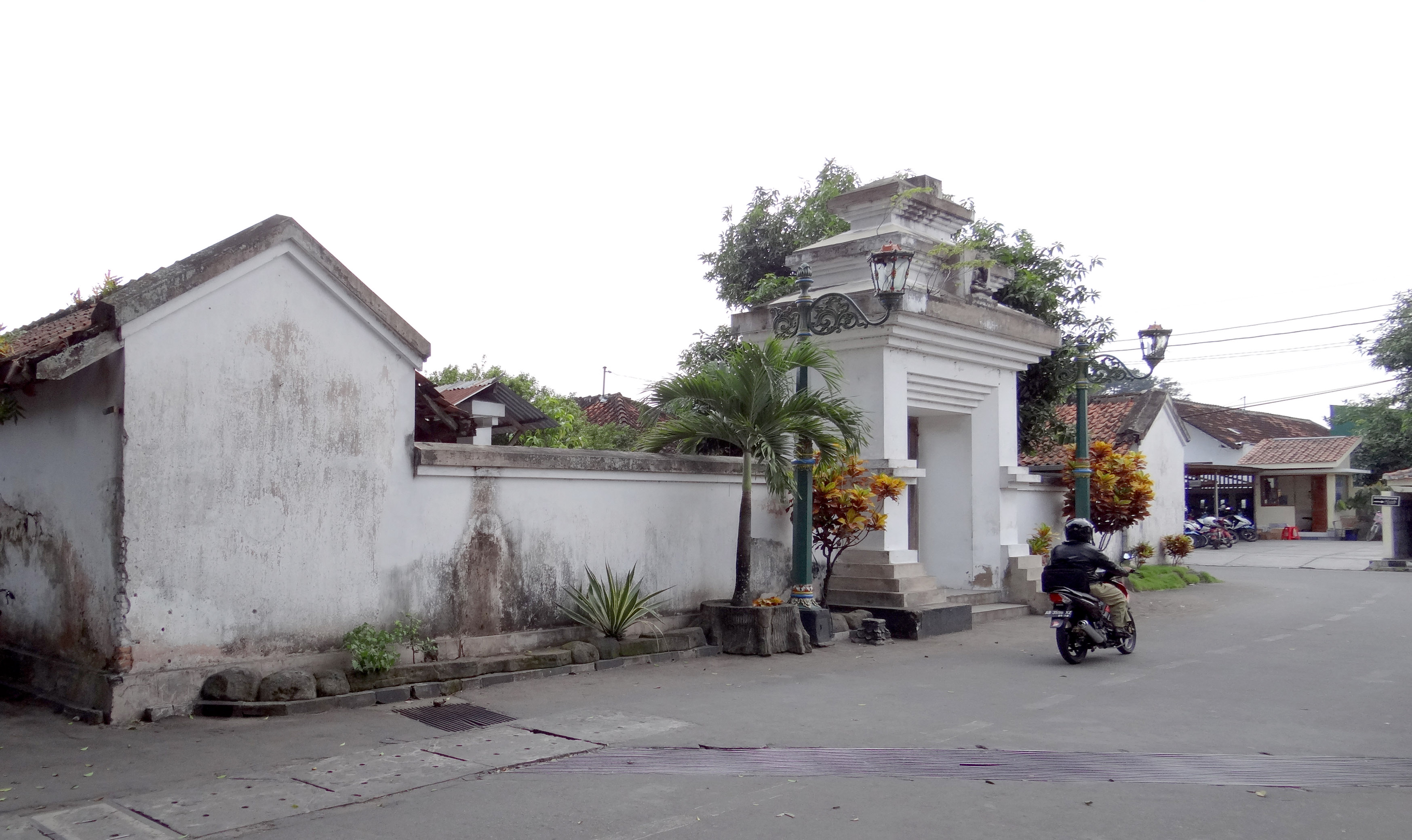
Hastorenggo cemetery, a 1930s cemetery complex for the descendants of the royal family of Kraton Yogyakarta.

The royal cemetery is named Makam Kota Gede (in Indonesian) or formally (Pasareyan) Hasta Kitha Ageng (in Javanese). It is located to the west of the Great Mosque. It is the most intact part of Kotagede. Chronicles mention that Senapati's father, Ki Gedhe Mataram, was buried to the west of the mosque and Senapati himself was buried to the south of the mosque, in the direction of his father's feet. Other important people buried in the cemetery include Sultan Hadiwijaya. The cemetery is guarded and maintained by Juru Kunci who are employed by the two palaces of Yogyakarta and Surakarta. The portal to the cemetery has the feature of Hindu architecture, each portal contains a thick wooden handle heavily decorated with carvings. The walled cemetery does not act as a physical protection of the graves and their adornments, the enclosures separate the realm of the dead from those of the living.

Another royal cemetery nearby is the Hastorenggo cemetery. Built in 1934, it is a royal cemetery for certain descendants of the Yogyakarta palace and is still used today.

=== Alun-alun (square) ===
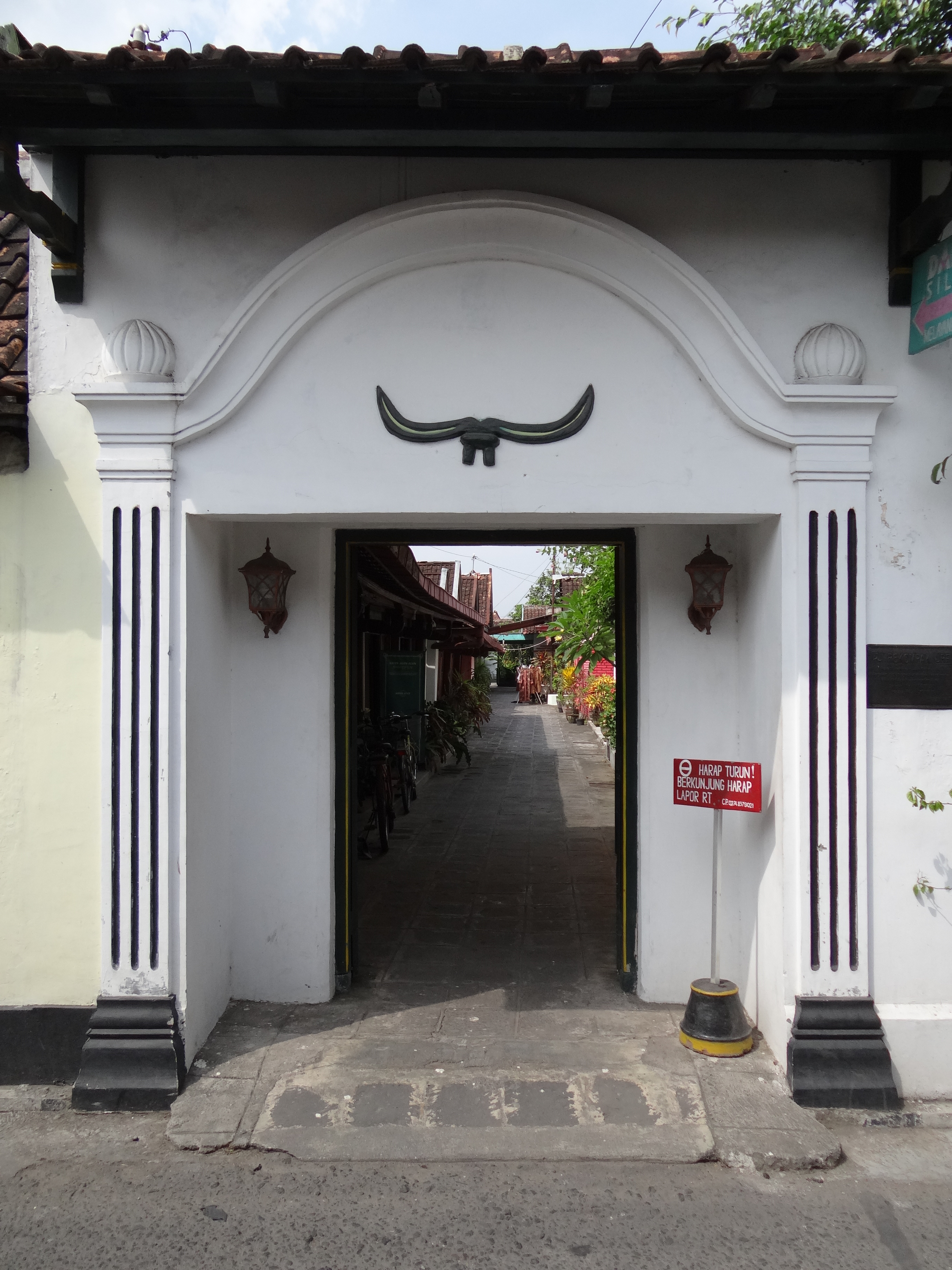
The entrance gate to the heritage area Kampung Alun-alun Cokroyudan, a neighborhood which develops on a former 16th-century Javanese city square of Kotagede.

Being an open field, there is no remains of the alun-alun. A present kampung (neighborhood) called "Alun-alun" is situated to the south of the market, right in front of the great mosque, signifying where the former alun-alun was. Another kampung called Cokroyudan is also located close to the former alun-alun.

The kampungs of Alun-alun and Cokroyudan have been designated a heritage neighborhood under the name "Kampung Pusaka Alun-alun Cokroyudan".

=== Market place ===
Kotagede's marketplace is situated in the middle of the town, at the juncture of its four main streets. It is considered an important part of the town that Kotagede was also known as Pasar Gede ("Great Market") or in short, Sargede. Since Panembahan Senapati bore the youth name of Ngabehi Loring Pasar, "Lord of the North of the Market", the market's existence is as old as the kingdom. Similar to the Roman Forum, the market is also a meeting place.

Legi, a day in Javanese week, is the market day for Kotagede, and so the market is also known as Pasar Legi or Sarlegi. The Pasar Legi of Kotagede is always held on Legi, unique in Yogyakarta.

=== Defensive wall ===
Panembahan Senopati built the inner city wall (cepuri) completed with the moat around the palace. These inner walls covered an area of more or less 400x400 meters. Ruins can still be seen on the southwest and southeast corners. The wall was 4 feet thick and made of stone blocks. The moat can be seen on the East, South, and West.

The outer city wall (baluwerti) is located to the south of the Batu Gilang site. The brick ruins are 50 meters long with remnants of the moat.

Bokong Semar is the name for the remains of the southeast corner of the city wall. It is a circular bastion, the name Bokong Semar (Semar's buttocks) is inspired by its rounded shape.

== Kotagede neighborhood ==
The townscape in the Kotagede neighborhood consists of traditional wooden joglo houses and eclectic merchant houses. Merchant houses in Kotagede are walled to protect their accumulating possessions during the 18th-19th century wealthy period of Kotagede. These merchant houses sometimes combine the elements from the wooden traditional Javanese house with the brick Dutch architecture to form an eclectic blend of Javanese-Dutch architecture known locally as "Kalang Houses".

Some neighborhoods contain narrow alleyways bordered by brick houses similar to European medieval cities.

The silver crafts' houses can be found around the mosque while their galleries are along Kemasan Street.

=== Jagalan ===
Kelurahan Jagalan, an area in Kotagede, contains several historic joglo houses, a traditional Javanese pavilion, and some eclectic Kalang Houses. The oldest joglo in the area is from the 1750s. They are protected as heritage sites.

Another form of traditional Javanese architecture is the langgar dhuwur (family mosque). Langgar dhuwur is a family prayer house located in the attic of several traditional houses in Kotagede. Langgar Dhuwur is built with wooden construction and is supported by wall columns. Previously, the placements of many langgar dhuwur formed a series that encircled the Mataram Royal Palace in Kotagede. Presently, only two langgar dhuwur remains, both are privately owned.

During the 2006 Yogyakarta earthquake, many of the traditional houses were destroyed. Some joglo houses were rebuilt, one example is Omah UGM, a joglo that was purchased by Gajah Mada University and rebuilt accordingly.

Blend of Javanese-Dutch architecture in Kotagede

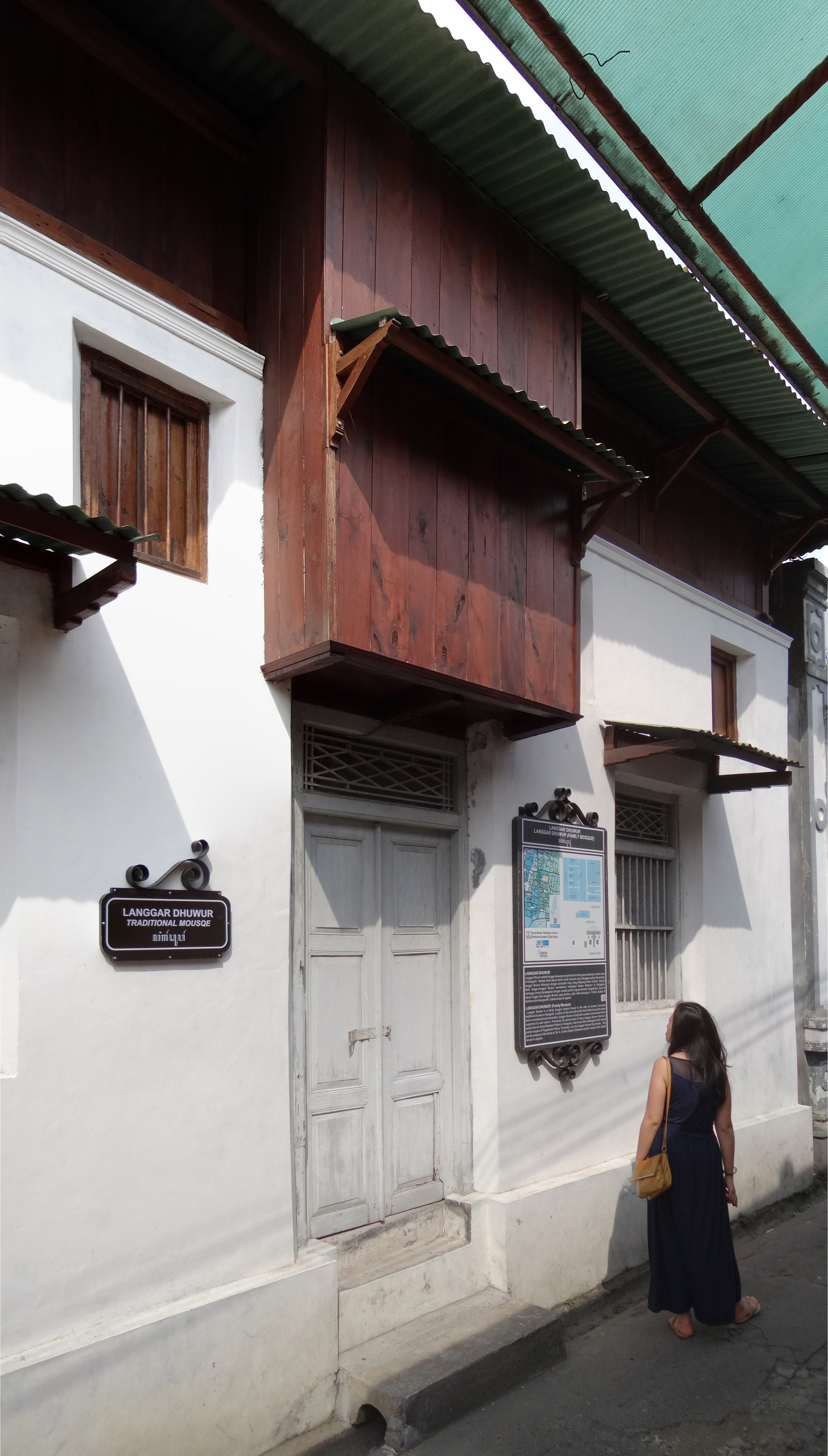
A langgar dhuwur (family mosque) in Kotagede.

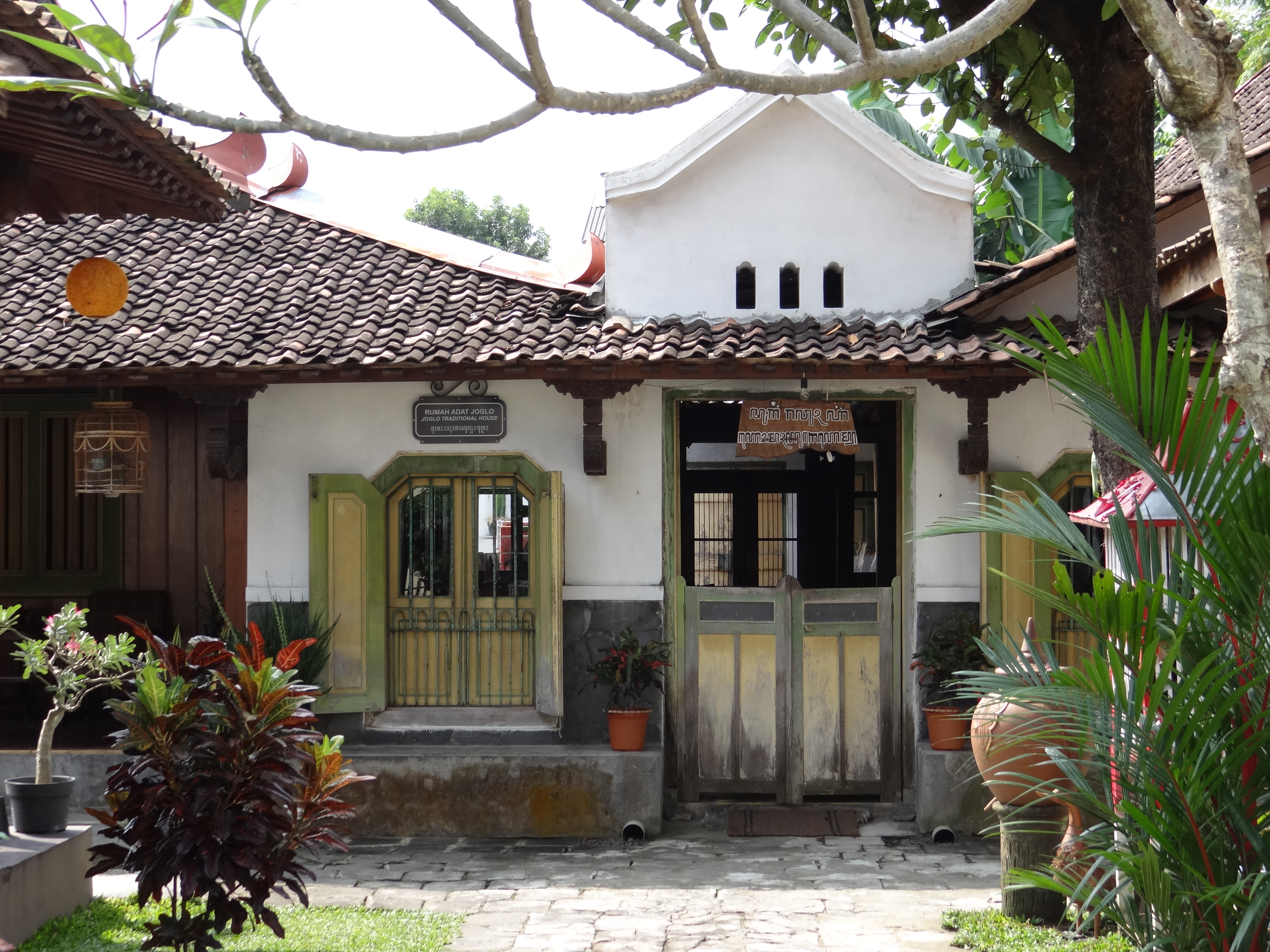
Omah UGM, traditional joglo complex showing blend of Javanese-Dutch architecture

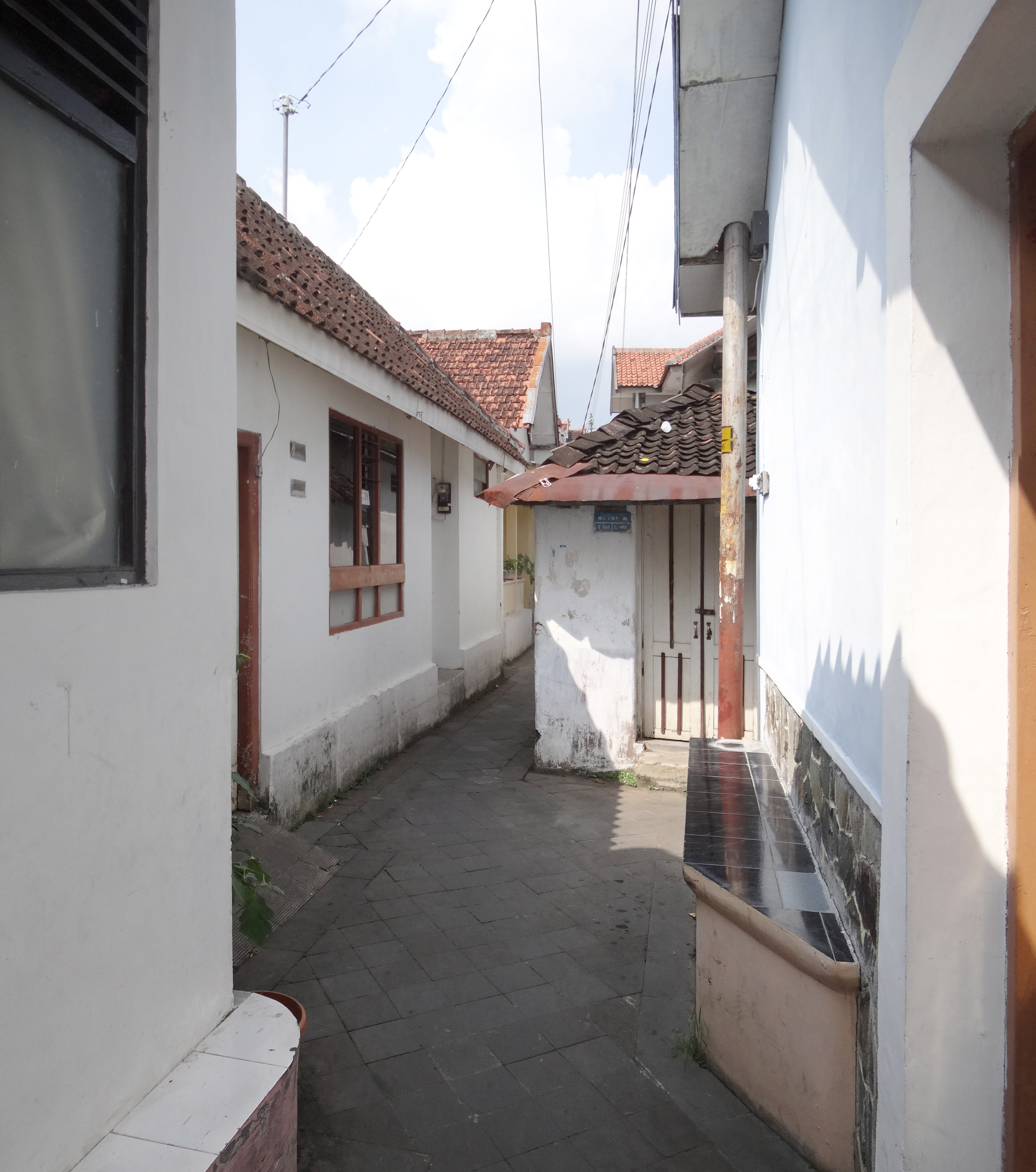
An alleyway in Jagalan district.

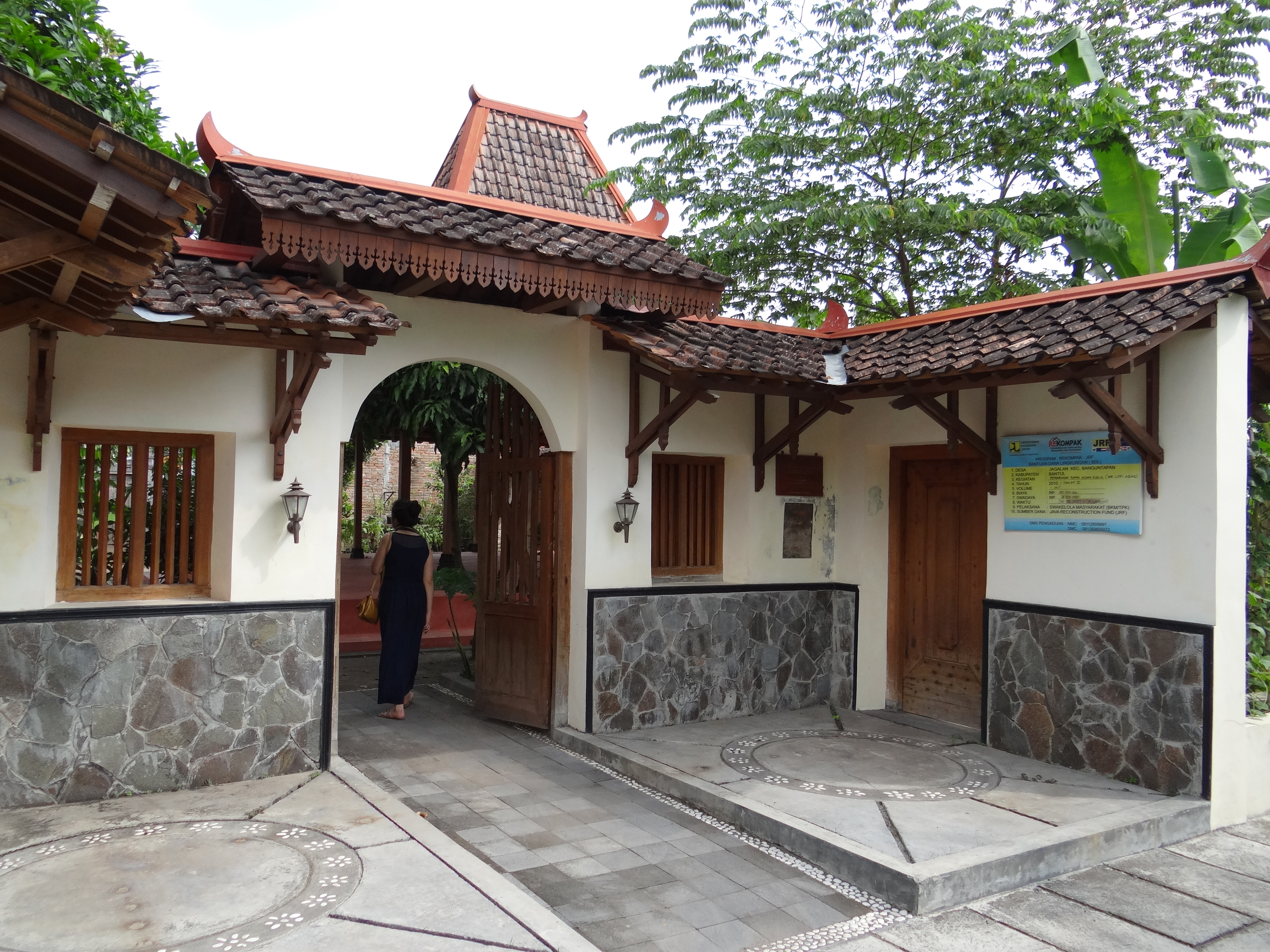
Entrance gate to a traditional joglo.

== Culture ==
Kotagede is well known for its silver crafts. It is also known for other Javanese crafts and arts (gold, silver, copper, leather, etc.) and local food (kipo, legomoro, etc.)

Performing arts include karawitan (local gamelan music groups), syalawatan (Islamic music group), mocopat (Javanese poetry reading), kroncong, tingklung wayang puppet, and offering ceremonies on special days (caos) and leading an ascetic religious life (tirakatan).

=== Silver crafts ===
Kotagede silversmiths grew since the establishment of Kotagede as the capital of Mataram. During that time, the traditional silver, gold and copper industries began to develop, dominated by the use of repoussé (embossing) techniques. The products of this region were to fulfill the need of household and ceremonial equipment for the royal family. During the colonial period of the 1930s, silverworks and silver handicrafts prospered in Kotagede. The Dutch colonial government established the Stichting Beverding van het Yogyakarta Kent Ambacht to protect the silverwork of Kotagede. Filigree technique enters Kotagede around 1950 under the influence of craftsmen from Kendari, Sulawesi. According to local silversmiths, Sastro Dimulyo with his company "SSO" was the pioneer for introducing filigree technique in Kotagede.

Kotagede's silverware is characterized with its floral motifs, e.g. leaf or lotus flower, based from the Hindu tradition; and their manual labor, kept historically authentic. Types of silverware produced by Kotagede are filigrees, silver-casting, sculptures (miniatures), and handmade products (necklaces, rings).

Jalan Kemasan, the main street leading into town from the north, is lined with silver workshops selling hand-beaten bowls, boxes, fine filigree and modern jewellery .

Silverworks of Kotagede

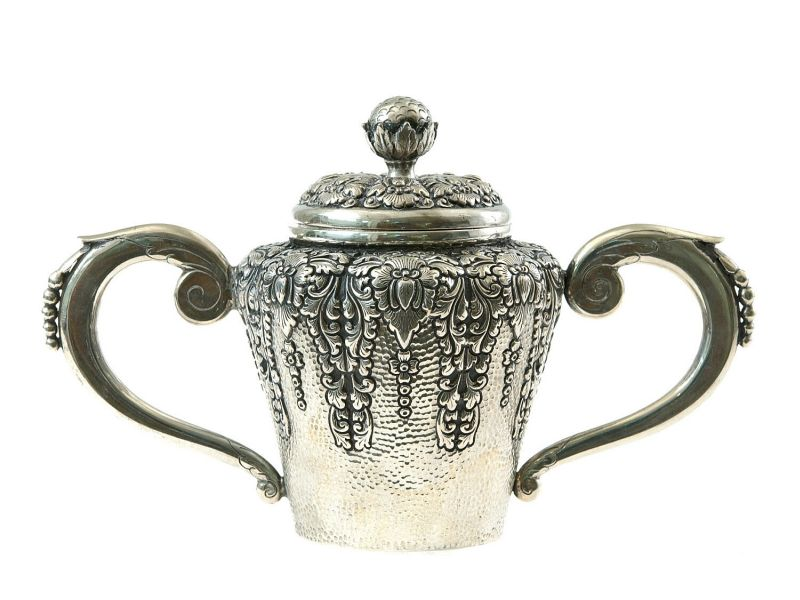
Sastro Sarjono's silver sugar pot, part of a tea set.

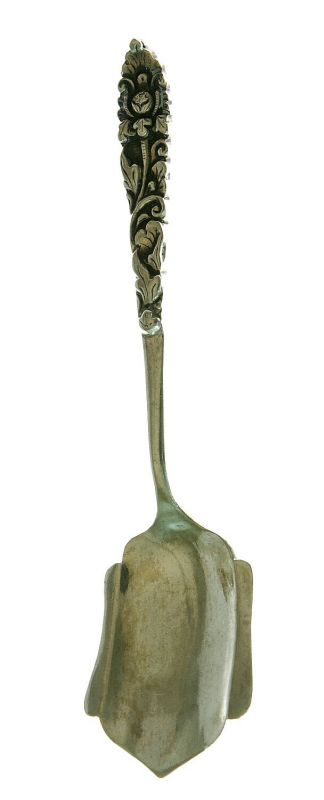
Sastro Sarjono's silver teaspoon, part of a tea set.

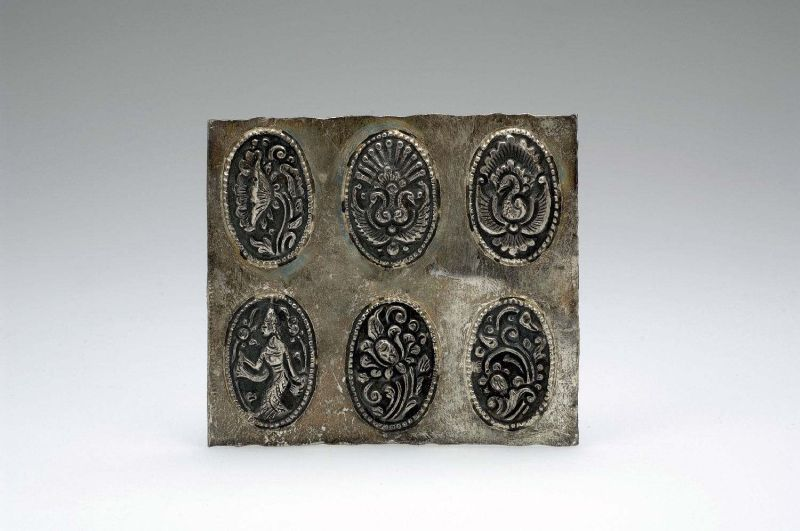
Half-finished silver medallions.

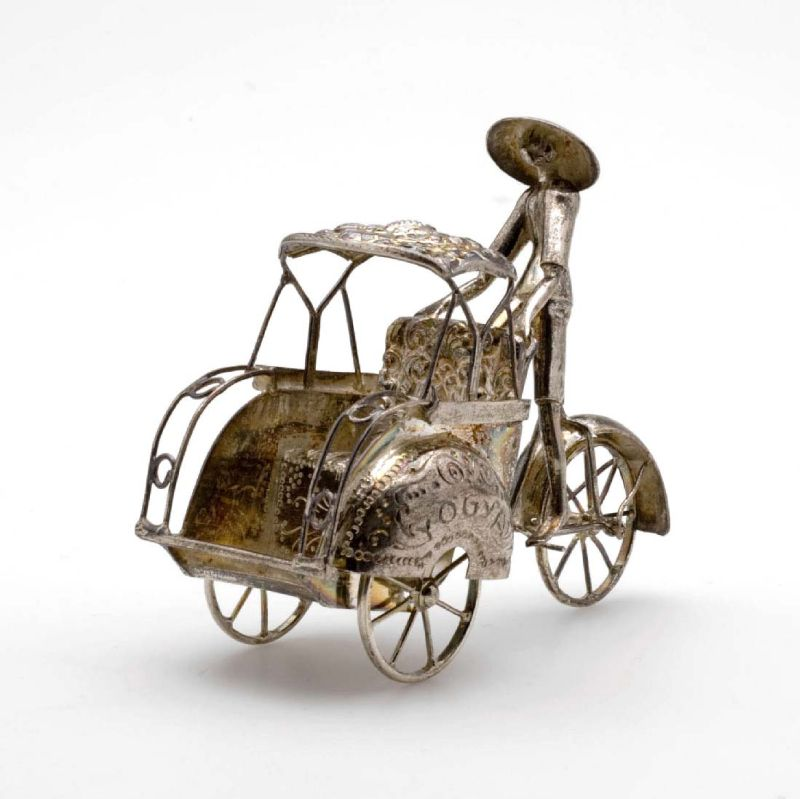
A decorative silver model of a becak.

== See also ==
- List of monarchs of Java
- Javanese sacred places

== Cited works ==
- Mook, H.J van, (1958) Kuta Gede before the Reorganization in 'The Indonesian Town/Studies in Urban Sociology', The Hague: W. van Hoeve
- Revianto Budi Santosa (2007). Kotagede: Life Between Walls. Gramedia Pustaka Utama. ISBN 9789792225471.
