= Kotagede Silver Mosque =

Mosque in Yogyakarta, Indonesia

Coordinates: 7°49′37″S 110°23′51″E

Kotagede Silver Mosque Masjid Perak Kotagede

Religion
- Affiliation: Islam – Sunni
- Province: Special Region of Yogyakarta

Location
- Location: Yogyakarta
- Country: Indonesia
- Interactive map of Kotagede Silver Mosque; Masjid Perak Kotagede

Architecture
- Type: Mosque
- Style: Javanese vernacular
- Established: 1937

Kotagede Silver Mosque (Indonesian: Masjid Perak Kotagede) (Javanese: ꦩꦱ꧀ꦗꦶꦢ꧀ꦥꦼꦫꦏ꧀ꦏꦺꦴꦠꦒꦼꦢꦼ), or as it is more widely known, Silver Mosque (Indonesian: Masjid Perak), is a historical mosque complex in Yogyakarta, Indonesia.

== History ==
Construction of the Kotagede Silver Mosque began in 1937 under the auspices of Muhammadiyah to serve the religious needs of the local Muslim community. At the time, it became the second mosque built in the Kotagede area, following the more well-known Great Mosque of Mataram (Indonesian: Masjid Gedhe Mataram). The mosque was officially inaugurated and opened for public worship on January 12, 1940.

The mosque played a significant role during Indonesia’s fight for independence. It served as a gathering point for members of Laskar Hizbullah, an Islamic paramilitary group, before they headed to the front lines to resist Dutch colonial forces.

Interestingly, the name "Silver Mosque" is not derived from the silver craftsmen for which Kotagede is famous. Instead, it is believed to have originated from a linguistic connection between the Indonesian word for silver, perak, and the Arabic word firoq, which means “separator.” Symbolically, the mosque is thought to serve as a place where people can separate themselves from worldly distractions and find spiritual clarity.

== Architecture ==
Originally, the Kotagede Silver Mosque featured traditional Javanese architectural elements, reflecting the local cultural and religious heritage. However, it sustained severe damage during the devastating 2006 Yogyakarta earthquake. Due to the extent of the destruction, the mosque was dismantled and underwent a complete reconstruction from 2009 to 2013. Despite the rebuilding, the new structure faithfully follows the design of the original, preserving its cultural and historical identity. Some decorative features from the old mosque were carefully restored and integrated into the new building, maintaining a tangible link to the mosque’s past.

== See also ==
- List of mosques in Indonesia
