= Joglo =

Javanese Traditional House in Java, Indonesia

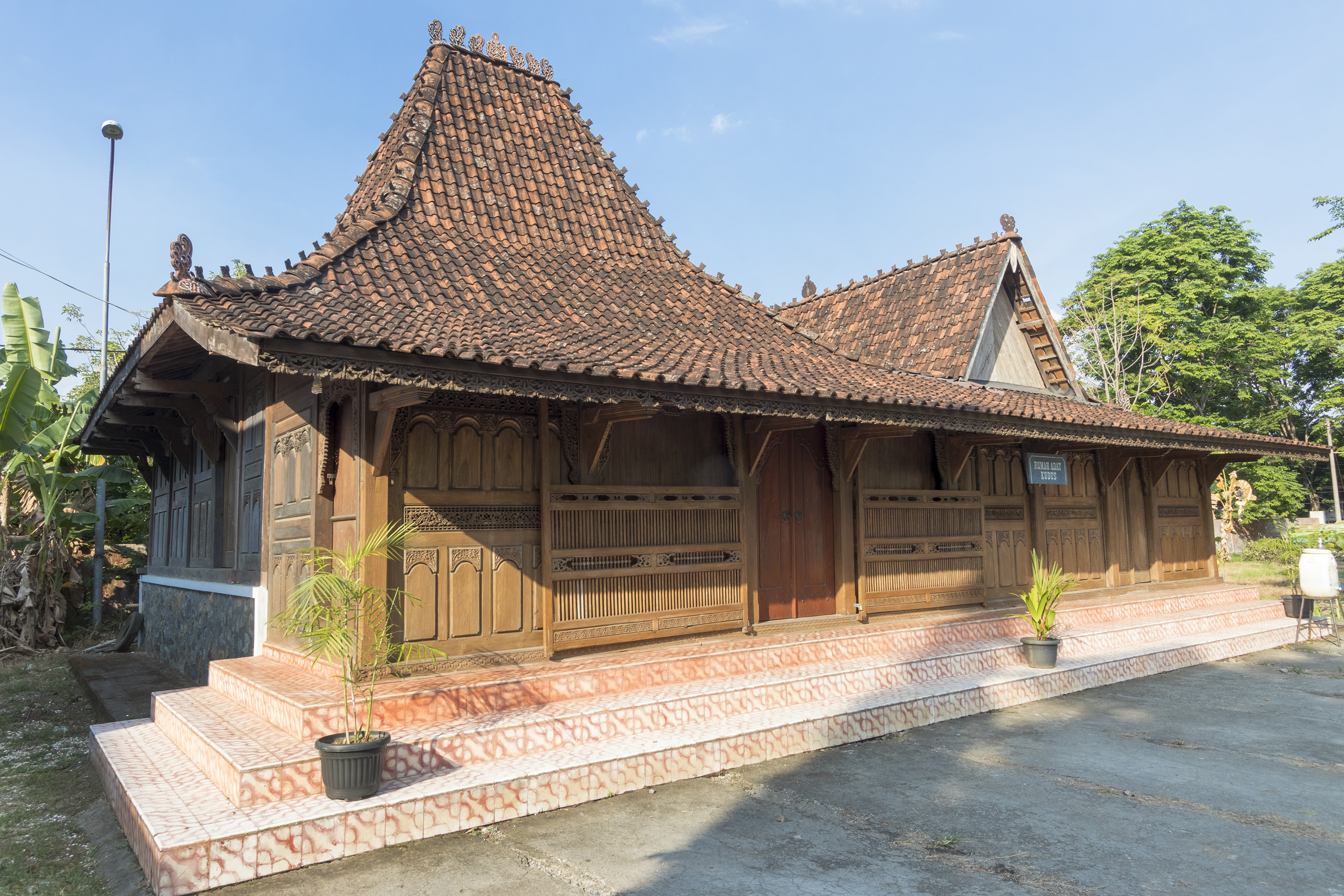
- Joglo house in Kudus, Central Java
- Alternative names: Rumah Adat Joglo

General information
- Status: Residences
- Type: Traditional House
- Architectural style: Indonesian
- Location: Central Java, East Java and Special Region of Yogyakarta, Indonesia
- Owner: Javanese

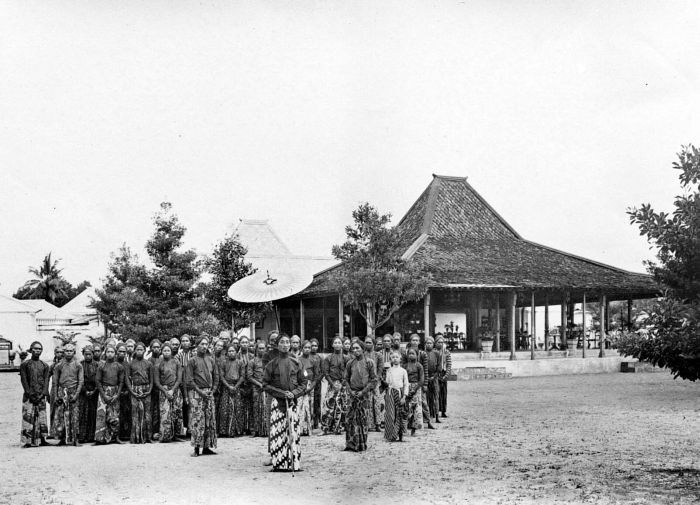
Joglo in Yogyakarta circa 1908

Joglo is a type of traditional vernacular house of the Javanese people (Javanese omah). The word joglo refers to the shape of the roof. In the highly hierarchical Javanese culture, the type of roof of a house reflects the social and economic status of the owners of the house; joglo houses are traditionally associated with Javanese aristocrats.

Joglo rooves can be implemented on a dwelling (omah) or a pavilion (pendopo).

== Structure and architecture ==
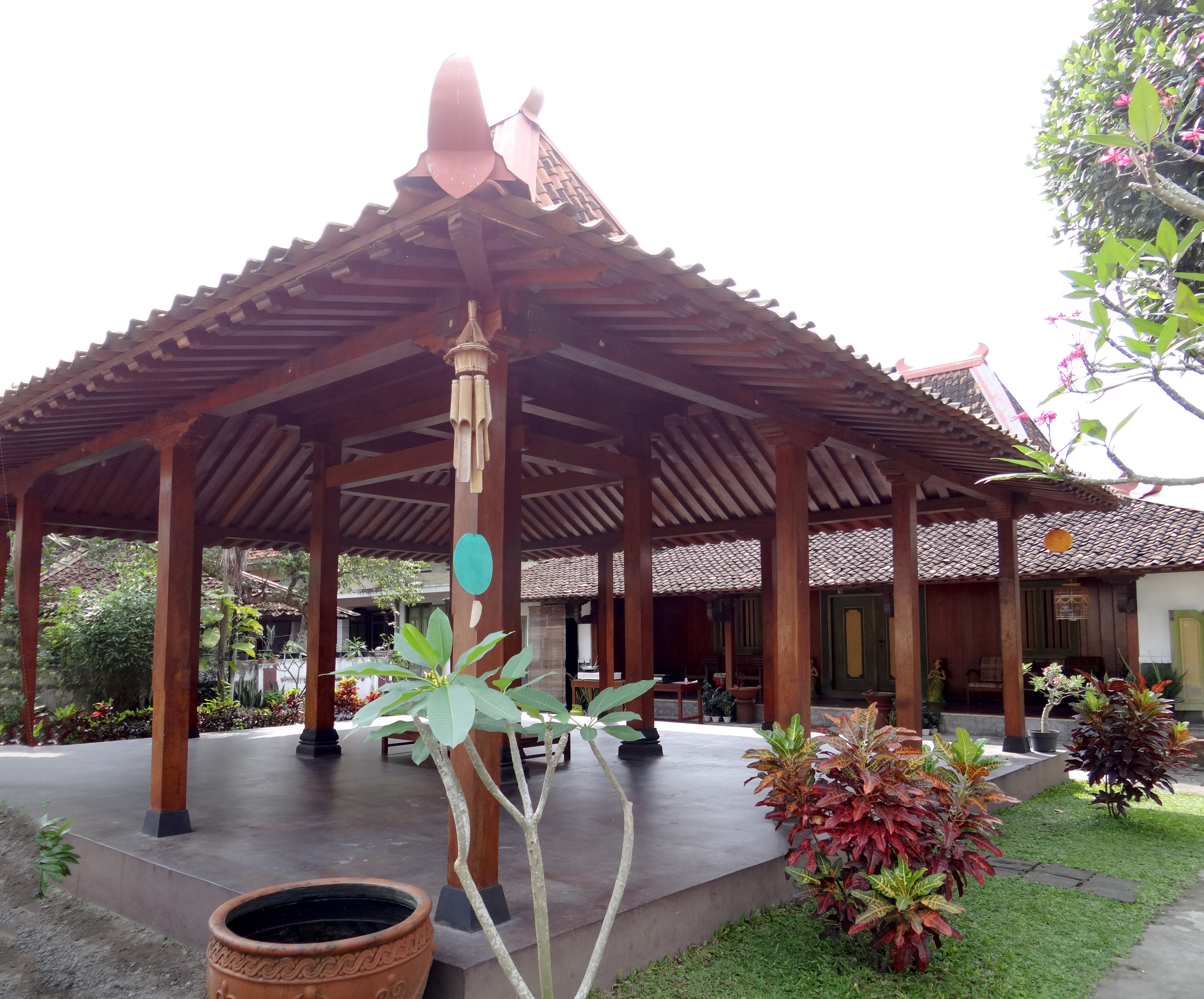
A joglo roof design for both the pendopo (pavilion) and the house in the background

The joglo roof is the most complex of all Javanese roof types. Different from the other type of Javanese roof such as the limasan and kampung roof, the joglo roof does not use king posts. Joglo roof consists of columns that become higher as it goes to the center. The four innermost main house columns are often the tallest, while the outer columns are the lowest. These four innermost house columns support a roof that is the steepest of all types of Javanese roof; almost forming a pyramid, except that it comes to two points rather than a single one. These four innermost main house columns are surmounted by a unique structural element known as tumpang sari. A tumpang sari is a layered beam structure; the outermost band of beams supports the rafters of both the upper and lower roofs, while the heavily ornate inner band of beams creates a vaulted ceiling in the form of an inverted stepped pyramid.

The basic joglo-type houses can be increased in size by adding extra columns and extending the roof area outwards. Some very large joglo roofs, such as the roof of the Grand Pendopo of the Mangkunegaran Palace, have a shape reminiscent of a mountain.

Traditionally, the joglo roof is used for the house proper (omah) or the pavilion (pendopo) of noble families. In a large house compound of a Javanese noble family, the joglo roof covers the very center part of the house. The space in the middle of the house, known as the dalem, is considered the most sacred. This sacred space – especially the area beneath the tumpang sari – is often left empty. In modern times, the area has no specific usage, but traditionally an incense was burnt once a week in this area to honor the rice goddess Dewi Sri, or in Central Java, to honor Nyai Roro Kidul. This sacred area is also the area where the bride and bridegroom are seated during their marriage ceremony.

The joglo roof is an iconic Javanese roof form. Joglo roof has influenced the development of Dutch colonial architecture in Indonesia. Modern buildings in Indonesia, such as big halls or airport terminal buildings, sometimes use the joglo roof.

== Social status ==
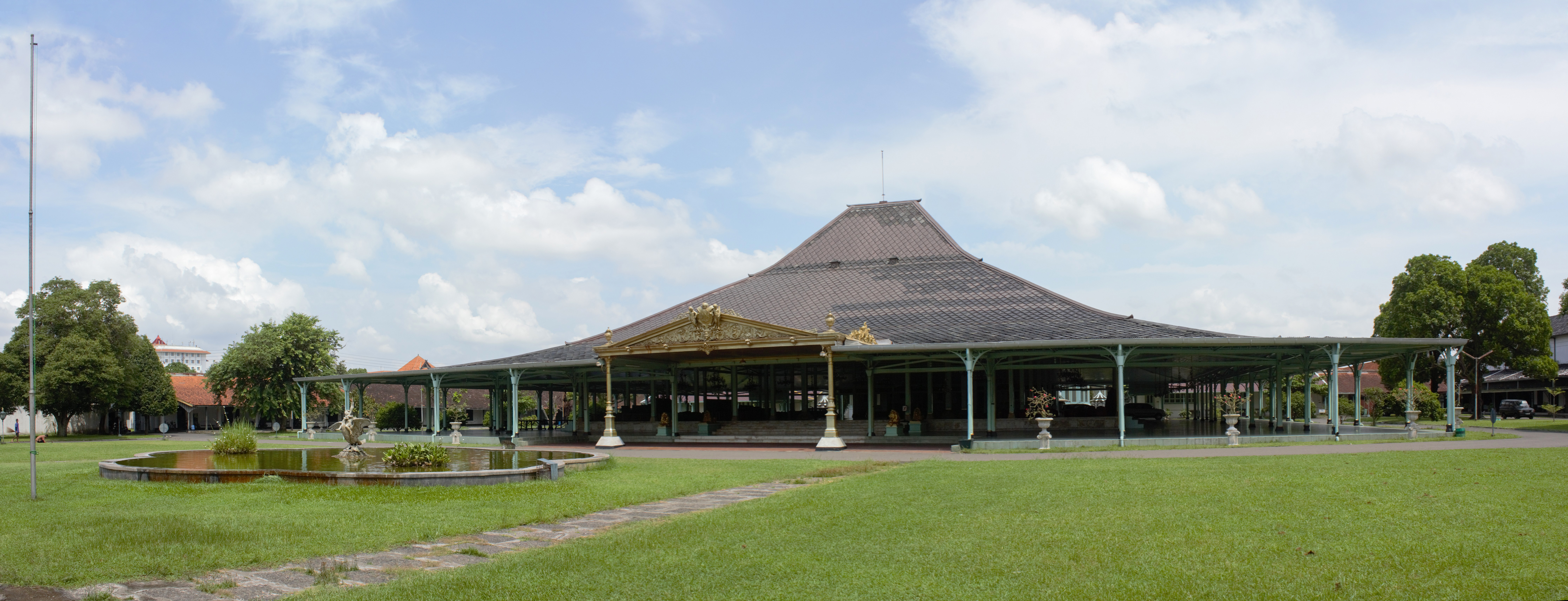
An immense royal pendopo in Mangkunegaran Palace shows joglo roof after being extended outward multiple times.

In a structured Javanese society and tradition, the joglo house is traditionally associated with the residence of Javanese aristocrats. The joglo-type houses is reserved for the Javanese palace, official residence, government estate, and the house of nobles (ningrat).

== Types ==
There are seven types of joglo buildings: Joglo Kepuhan (used for the peringgitan), Taraju Mas, Lambang Gantung or Pangrawit (used for the audience hall of the royal palace), Joglo Wantah, Joglo Ceblokan, Tawon Boni and Semar Tinandu. Joglo buildings are further divided into two styles, the male and female; the difference between them is that the male version is larger in dimension than the female.

== See also ==
- Javanese traditional house
- Pendopo
- Indonesian architecture
- Kraton (Indonesia)

== Works cited ==
- Gunawan Tjahjono, ed. (1998). Architecture. Indonesian Heritage. Vol. 6. Singapore: Archipelago Press. ISBN 981-3018-30-5.
- Schoppert, P.; Damais, S. (1997). Java Style. Singapore: Didier Millet. ISBN 9625932321.
- Suwito Santoso; Kestity Pringgoharjono (2006). The Centhini Story: The Javanese Journey of Life : Based on the Original Serat Centhin. Translated by Suwito Santoso (illustrated ed.). Singapore: Marshall Cavendish. ISBN 9789812329752.
