= Javanese traditional house =

Javanese traditional house (Javanese: ꦲꦺꦴꦩꦃꦠꦿꦝꦶꦱꦶꦪꦺꦴꦤꦭ꧀ꦗꦮ, romanized: Omah tradhisional Jawa) refers to the traditional vernacular houses of Javanese people in the central and eastern parts of Java island, Indonesia.

== Roof styles ==
Javanese hierarchy of roof form

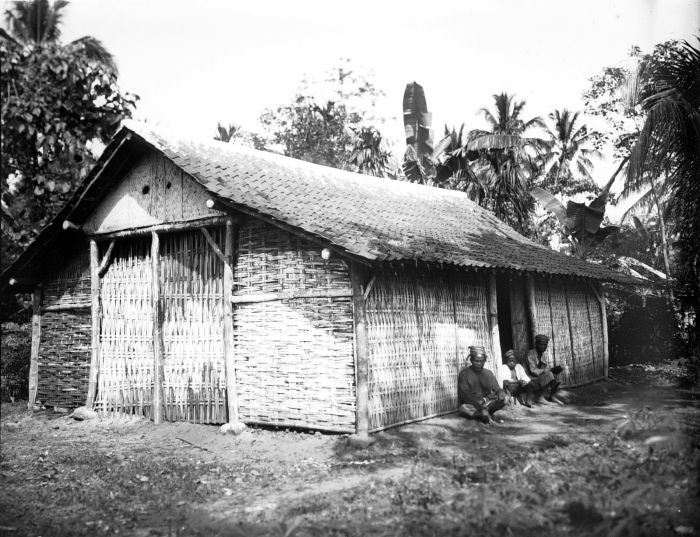
An extended kampung-type roof in a house of Javanese common people.

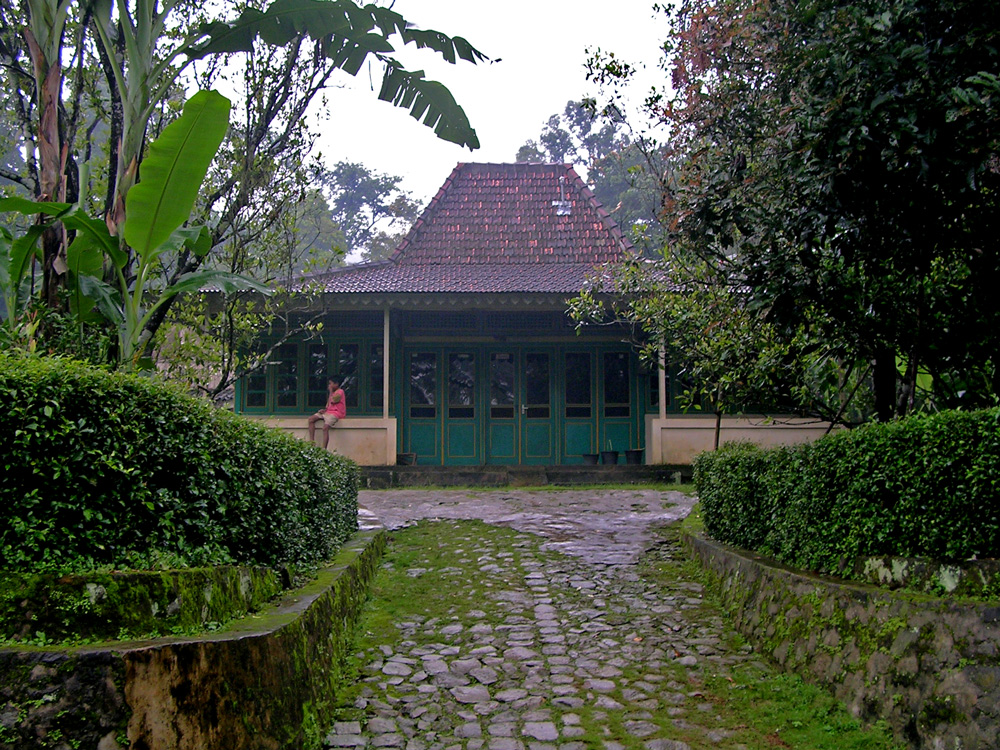
Limasan-type roof associated with higher status Javanese families appears in this house in a village near Salatiga.

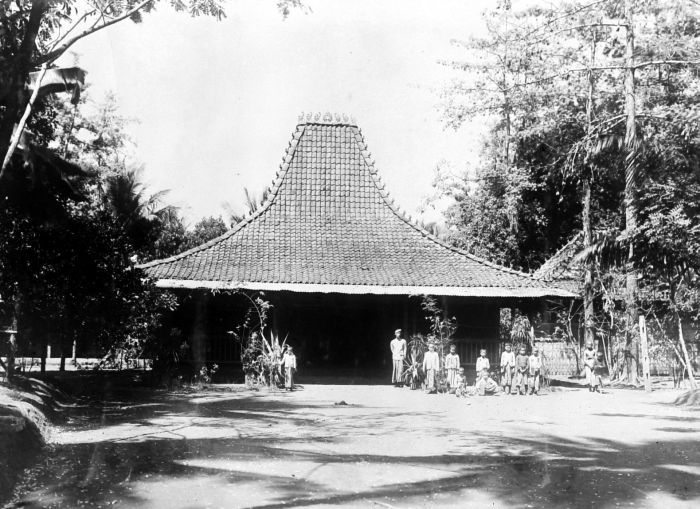
Joglo-type roof appears in this residence of the head of a village in Jepara.

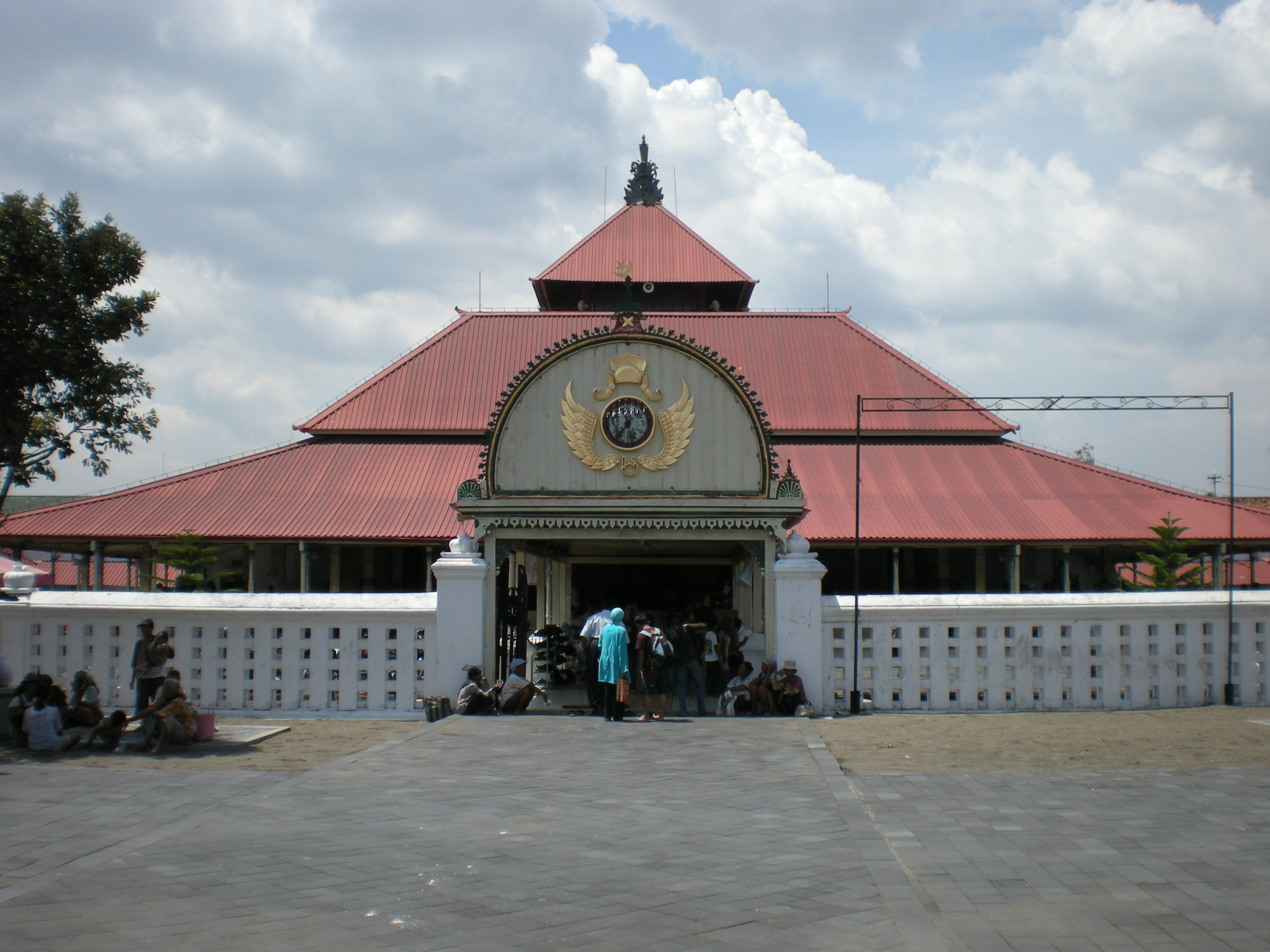
Tajug-type or Meru-type roof is always reserved for sacred spaces such as this mosque in Yogyakarta.

== Gallery ==
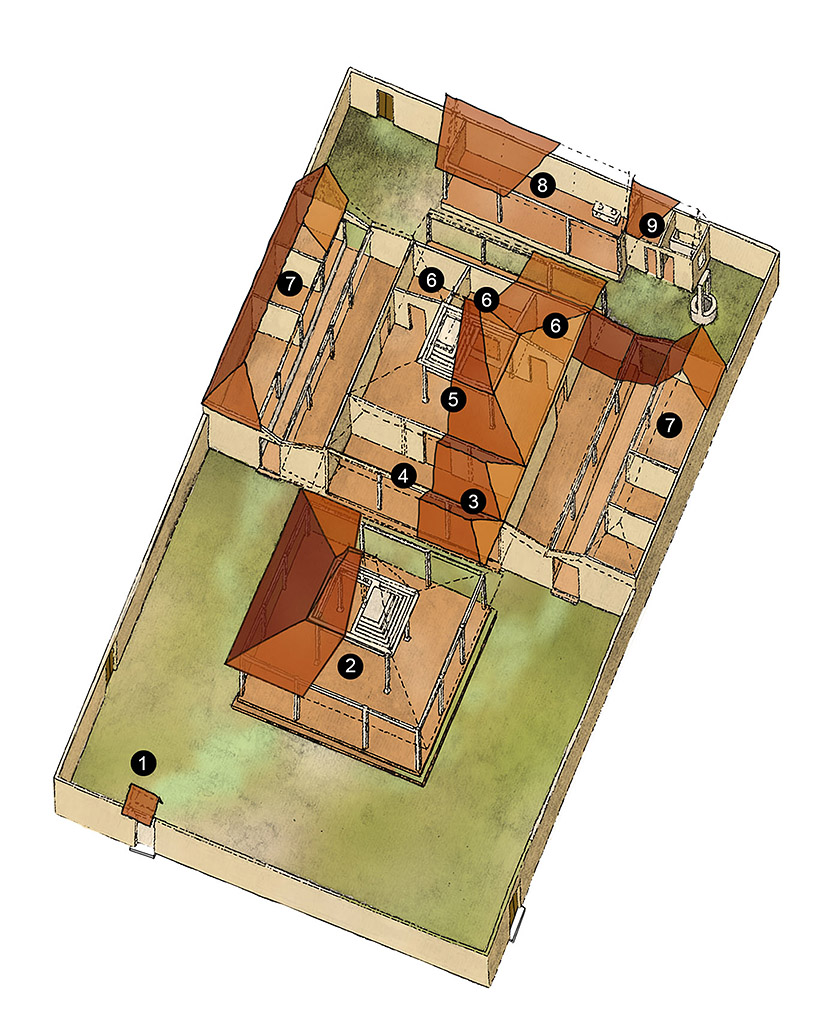
Layout of an ideal Javanese house compound. Legend: 1. lawang 2. pendopo 3. peringgitan 4. emperan 5. dalem 6. senthong 7. gandok 8. pawon

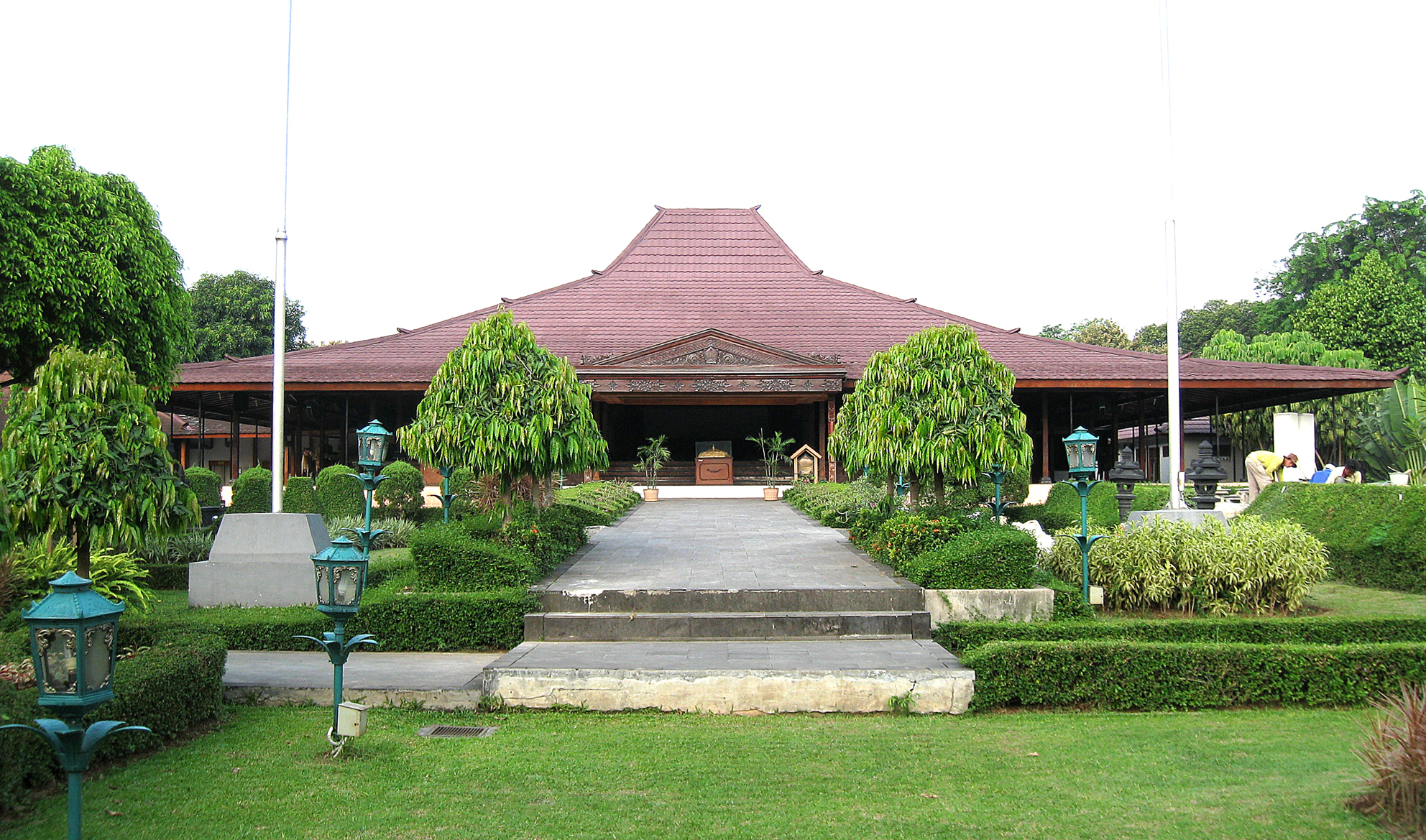
A joglo-type roof in Central Java pavilion, Taman Mini Indonesia Indah, modeled after Mangkunegaran palace

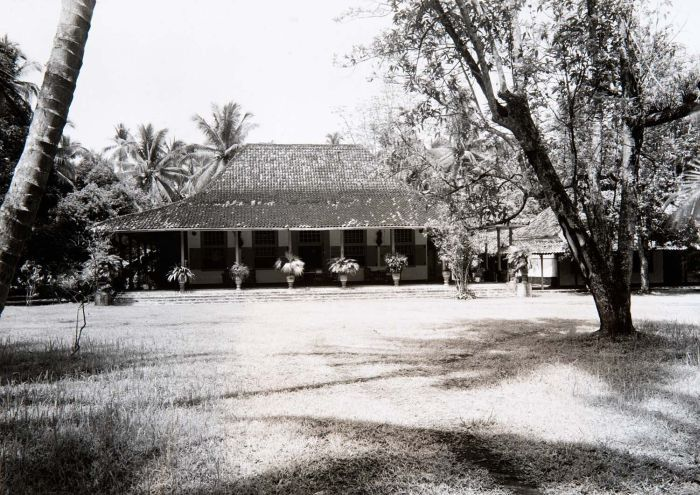
Landhuis Depan in Batavia is a Dutch Indies country houses which had completely assimilated with the Javanese house style.

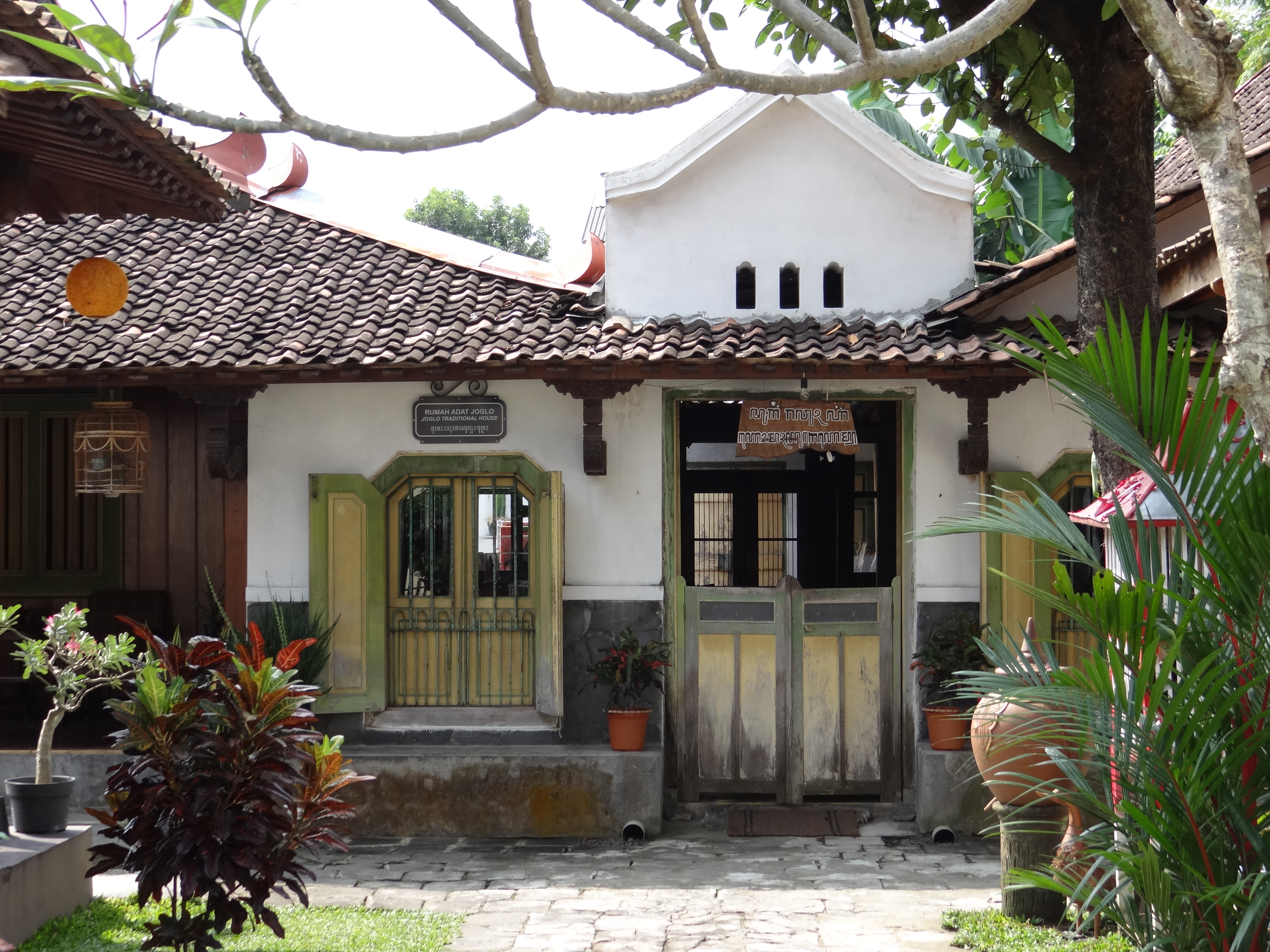
Side entrance to a gandok in the Omah UGM, Kotagede

== See also ==
- Indonesian architecture
- Rumah adat
- Kraton (Indonesia)
- List of mosques in Indonesia
- Dutch Indies country houses
- Kotagede

== Works cited ==
- Gunawan Tjahjono, ed. (1998). Architecture. Indonesian Heritage. Vol. 6. Singapore: Archipelago Press. ISBN 981-3018-30-5.
- Het Indische bouwen: architectuur en stedebouw in Indonesie : Dutch and Indisch architecture 1800–1950. Helmond: Gemeentemuseum Helmond. 1990.
- Schoppert, P.; Damais, S. (1997). Java Style. Singapore: Didier Millet. ISBN 9625932321.
