= Mosque architecture in Indonesia =

Complex of multiple built objects

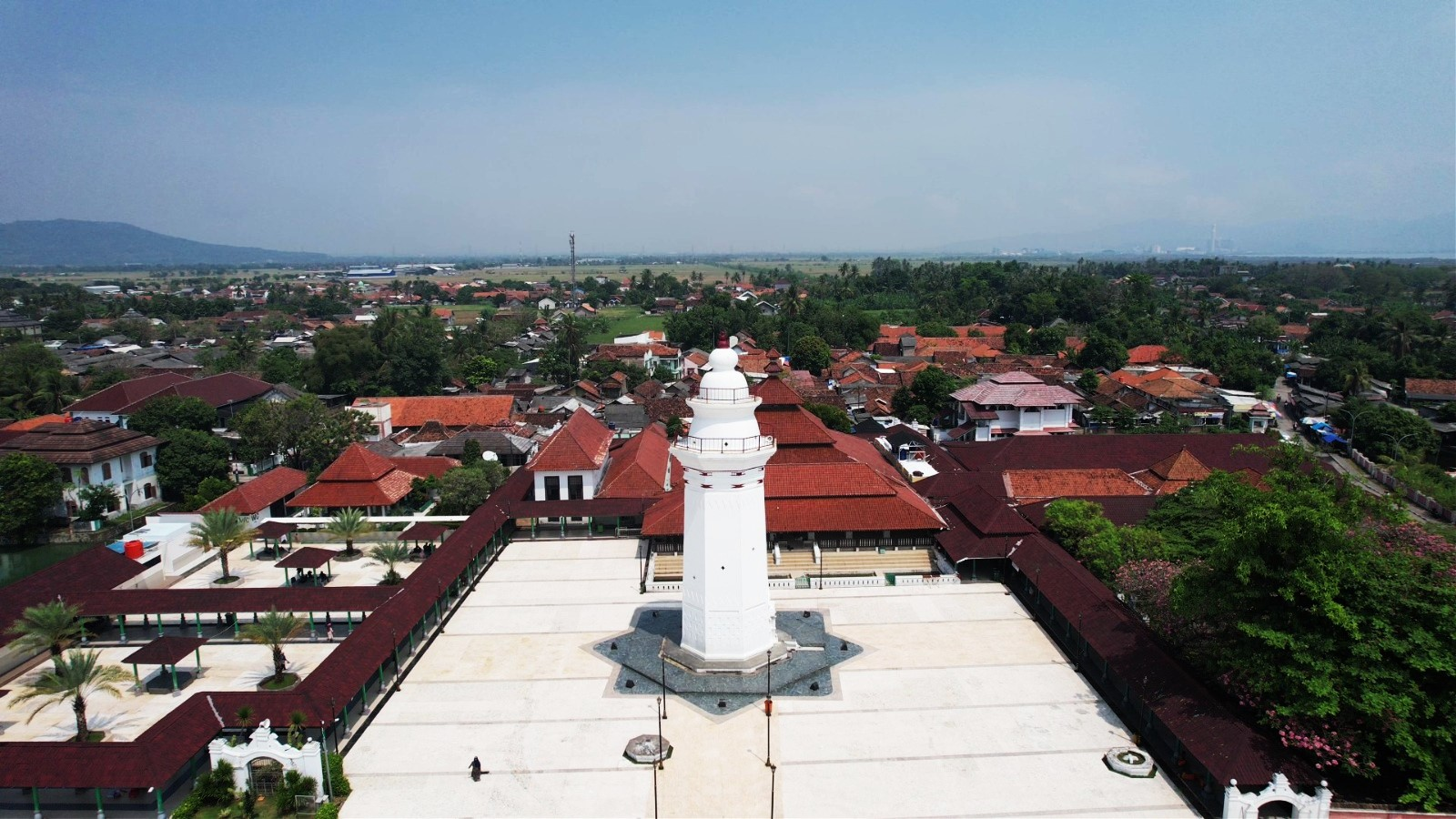
The Great Mosque of Banten with a 17th-century minaret and its multi-tiered roofs follows the traditional architecture of a mosque found in the Indonesian archipelago.

Mosque architecture in Indonesia refers to the architectural traditions of mosques built in the archipelago of Indonesia. Initial forms of the mosque, for example, were predominantly built in the vernacular Indonesian architectural style mixed with Hindu, Buddhist or Chinese architectural elements, and notably didn't equip orthodox form of Islamic architectural elements such as dome and minaret. Vernacular architectural style varies depending on the island and region.

Since the 19th century, the mosques began incorporating more orthodox styles which were imported during the Dutch colonial era. Architectural style during this era is characterized by Indo-Islamic or Moorish Revival architectural elements, with onion-shaped dome and arched vault. Minaret was not introduced to full extent until the 19th century, and its introduction was accompanied by the importation of architectural styles of Persian and Ottoman origin with the prominent usage of calligraphy and geometric patterns. During this time, many of the older mosques built in traditional style were renovated, and small domes were added to their square hipped roofs.

== History ==
Islam spread gradually in Indonesia from the 12th century onwards, and especially during the 14th and 15th centuries. The advent of Islam did not lead to the introduction of a new building tradition but saw the appropriation of existing architectural forms, which were reinterpreted to suit Muslim requirements.

=== Early Islamic architecture ===
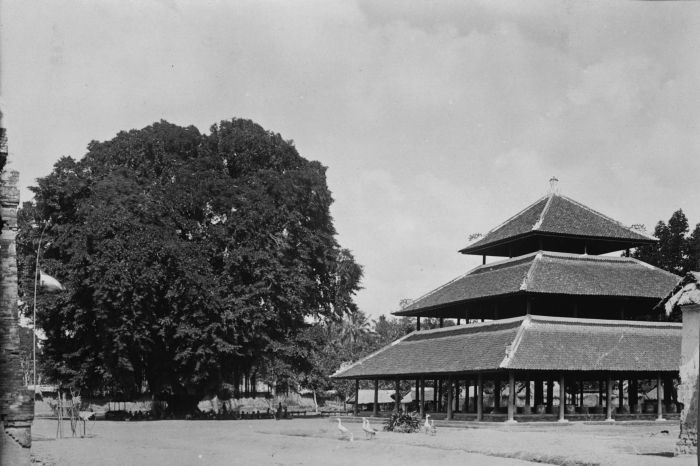
This multi-tiered pavilion in Bali (wantilan) is similar in form with some of the earliest mosques in Indonesia.

While many of the earliest Islamic structures in Java and almost all of them in Sumatra did not survive, primarily due to the effects of climate on decayable building materials, the permanent structure was not considered a priority for Muslim prayer, as any clean and open space could accommodate communal prayers.

Most of the early Islamic mosques can still be found in Java, and the architectural style follows the existing building tradition in Java. The characteristic of Javanese Islamic architecture includes multi-tiered roofs, ceremonial gateways, four central posts that support a soaring pyramidal roof, and a variety of decorative elements such as elaborate clay finials for roof peaks. The multi-tiered roofs are derived from the tiered meru roof found in Balinese temple. Some early Javanese Islamic architectures resemble a Majapahit era candi or gates.

The oldest surviving Indonesian mosques are quite large and in most cases were closely associated with palaces. The oldest surviving mosque in Indonesia is the Great Mosque of Demak which is the royal mosque of the Sultanate of Demak, although this is not the oldest Islamic structure. The oldest Islamic structure in Indonesia are parts of the royal palace in Sultanate of Cirebon, Cirebon. The palace complex contains a chronogram which can be read as the Saka equivalent of 1454 CE. Early Islamic palaces retain many features of pre-Islamic architecture which is apparent in the gates or drum towers. The Kasepuhan Palace was probably begun in the late pre-Islamic period and continued to grow during the Hinduism-to-Islam transitional period. The complex contains clues to the stages of the process of the gradual changes as Islam becomes incorporated into Indonesian architecture. Two of the Hindu features adopted into Islam in the Palace are the two types of gateways - the split portal (candi bentar) which provides access to the public audience pavilion and the lintel gate (paduraksa) which leads to the frontcourt.

Minarets was not originally an integral part in Indonesian mosque. The Menara Kudus Mosque's tower was built in a Javanese Hindu brick temple style, This tower is not used as a minaret, but as a place for bedug, a huge drum which is beaten to the summons to prayer in Indonesia. This tower is similar to the Drumtowers of Hindu Balinese temples called kul-kul. These suggest a continuation of an earlier Hindu-Buddhist period into the Islamic era in Indonesia.

Traditionally, mosque establishment in Indonesia began with the opening or purchase of land for the mosque. Next is the first construction of the mosque, often using traditional material such as bamboo and thatched roof. The mosque will eventually be made into a permanent mosque and later gradually extended to accommodate the increasing population.

Some examples of the pre-colonial mosques in Indonesia

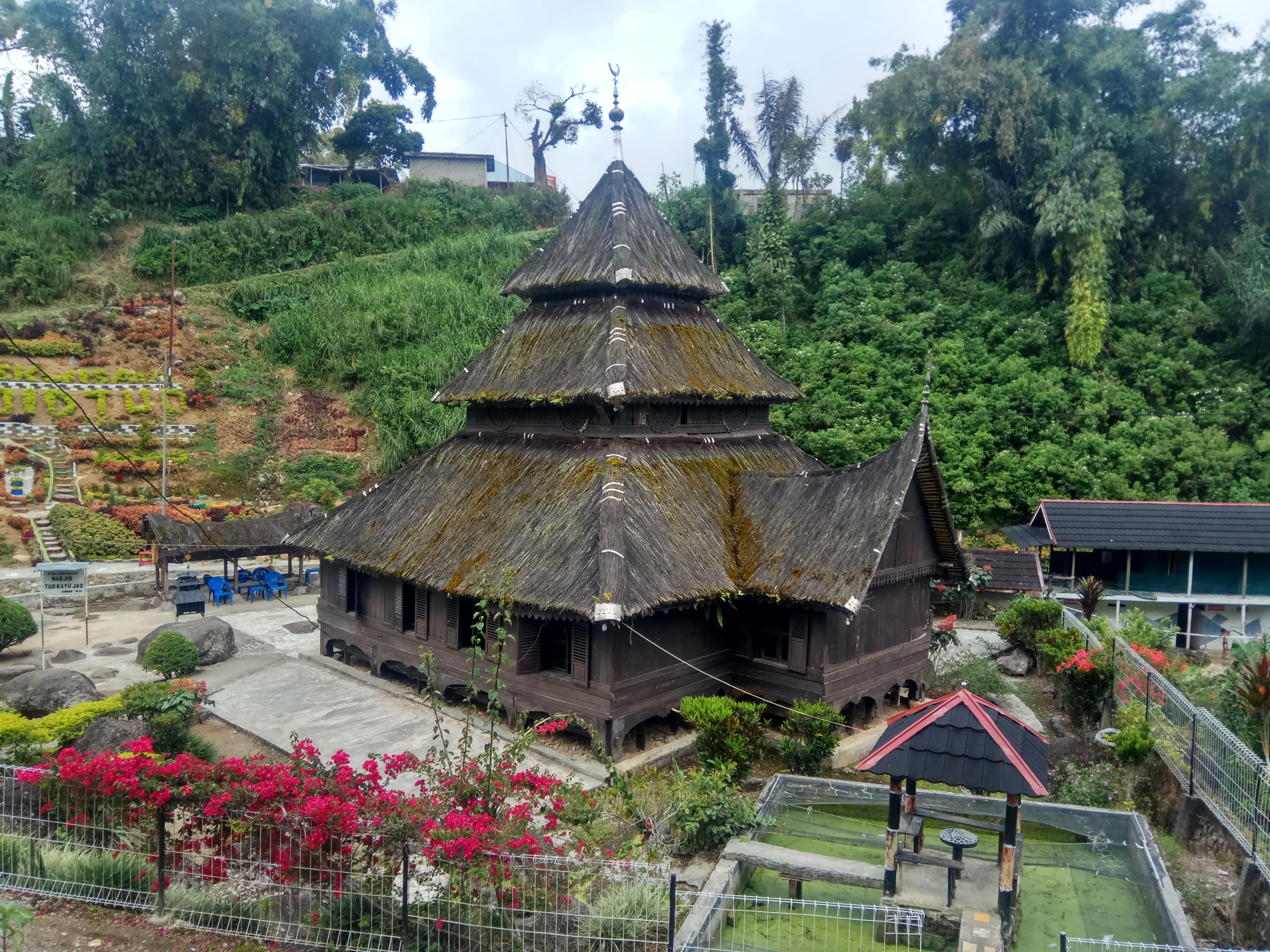
Tuo Kayu Jao Mosque in West Sumatra (16th century).

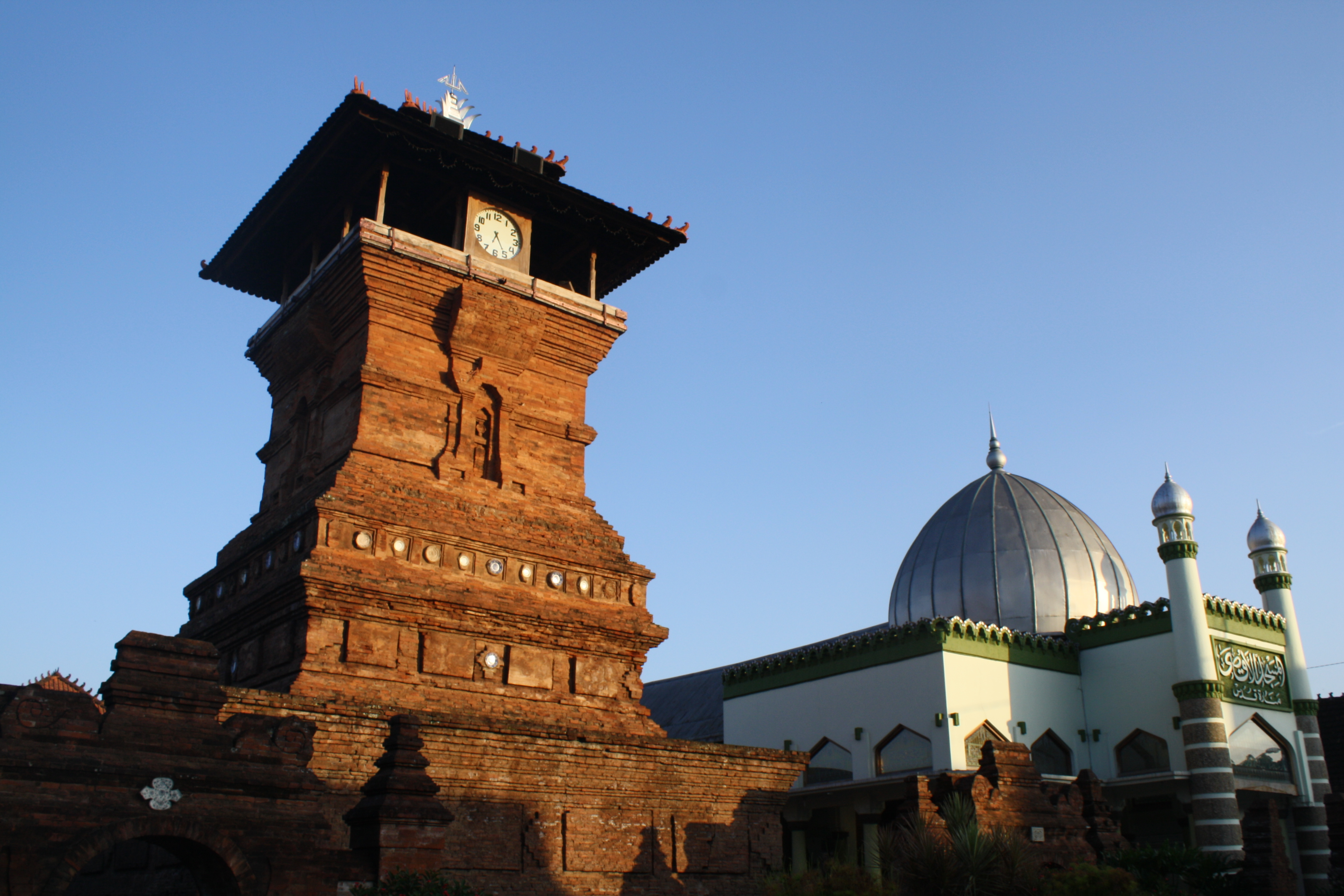
Menara Kudus Mosque in Central Java was built in the 16th century following the Hindu-Buddhist style of the Majapahit era.

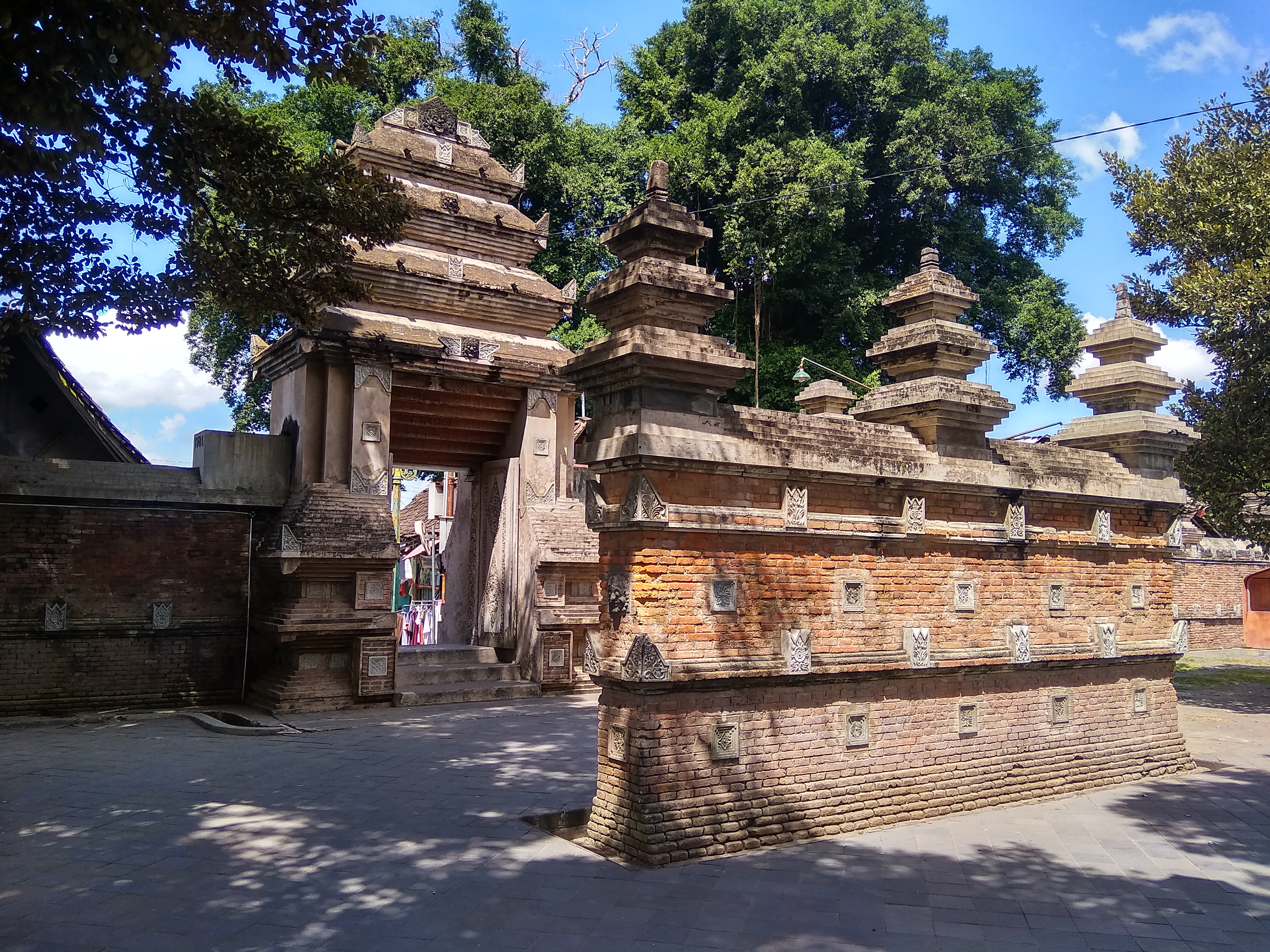
Gate of Panembahan Senapati Mosque in Kotagede, Yogyakarta.

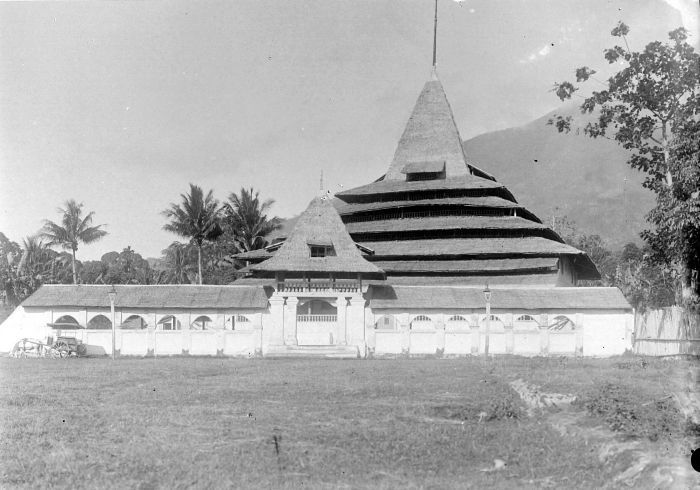
Sultan of Ternate Mosque in North Maluku (17th century).

=== Colonial period ===
Domes and pointed arches, well-known features in central, south and southwest Asia did not appear in Indonesia until the 19th century when they were introduced by Dutch influence over local rulers. Indonesian scholars became familiar with the Near Eastern influence as they began to visit Islamic centers in Egypt and India.

Domes in Indonesia follow the form of the Indian and Persian onion-shaped dome. These domes first appear in Sumatra. The Grand Mosque of Riau Sultanate in Penyengat Island is the oldest surviving mosque in Indonesia with a dome. There is an indication that the Rao Rao Mosque of West Sumatra employs a dome in its early design. The adoption of dome in mosques of Java was slower than it is in Sumatra. The oldest domed mosque in Java is probably Jami Mosque of Tuban (1928), followed by Great Mosque of Kediri and Al Makmur Mosque of Tanah Abang in Jakarta.

Some examples of the colonial era mosques in Indonesia

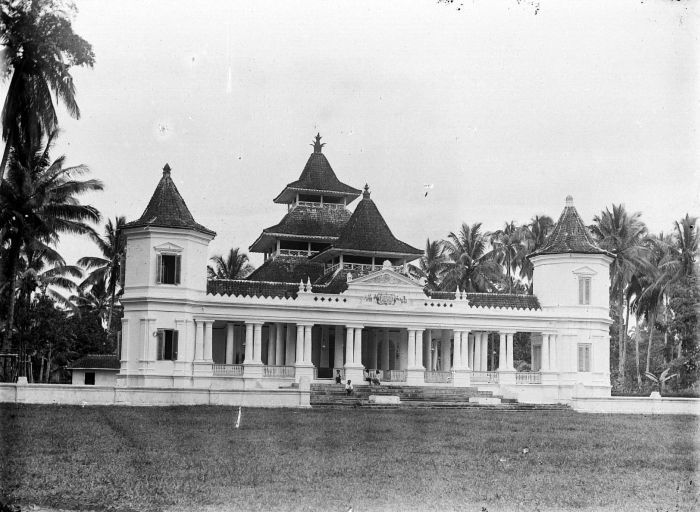
Manonjaya Great Mosque in Tasikmalaya, circa 1890

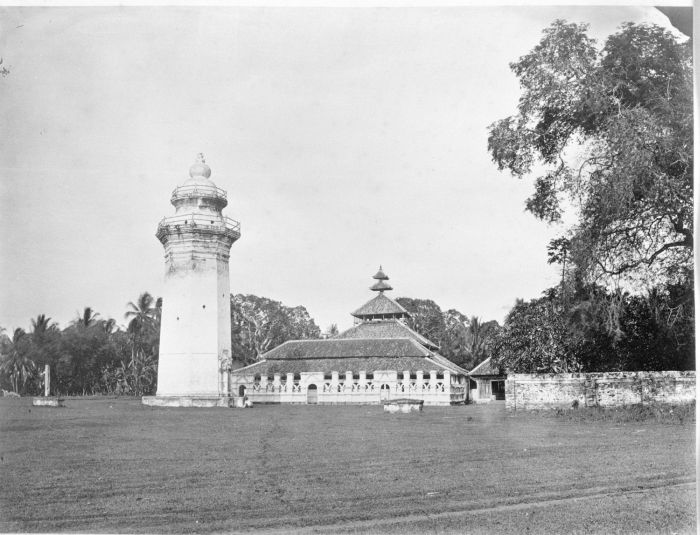
Great Mosque of Banten, circa 1857–1872

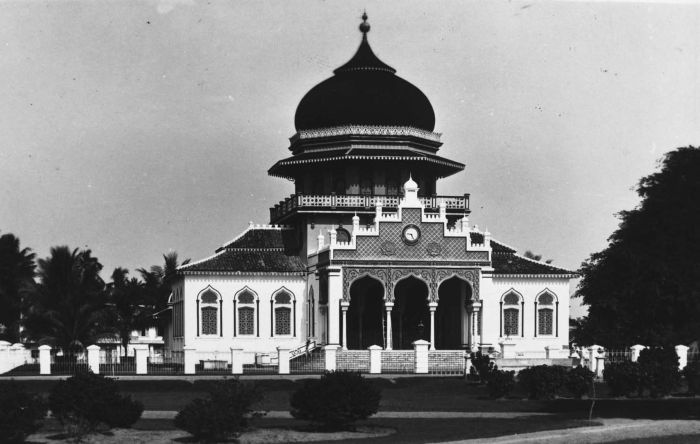
Baiturrahman Grand Mosque in Aceh, circa 1910–1930

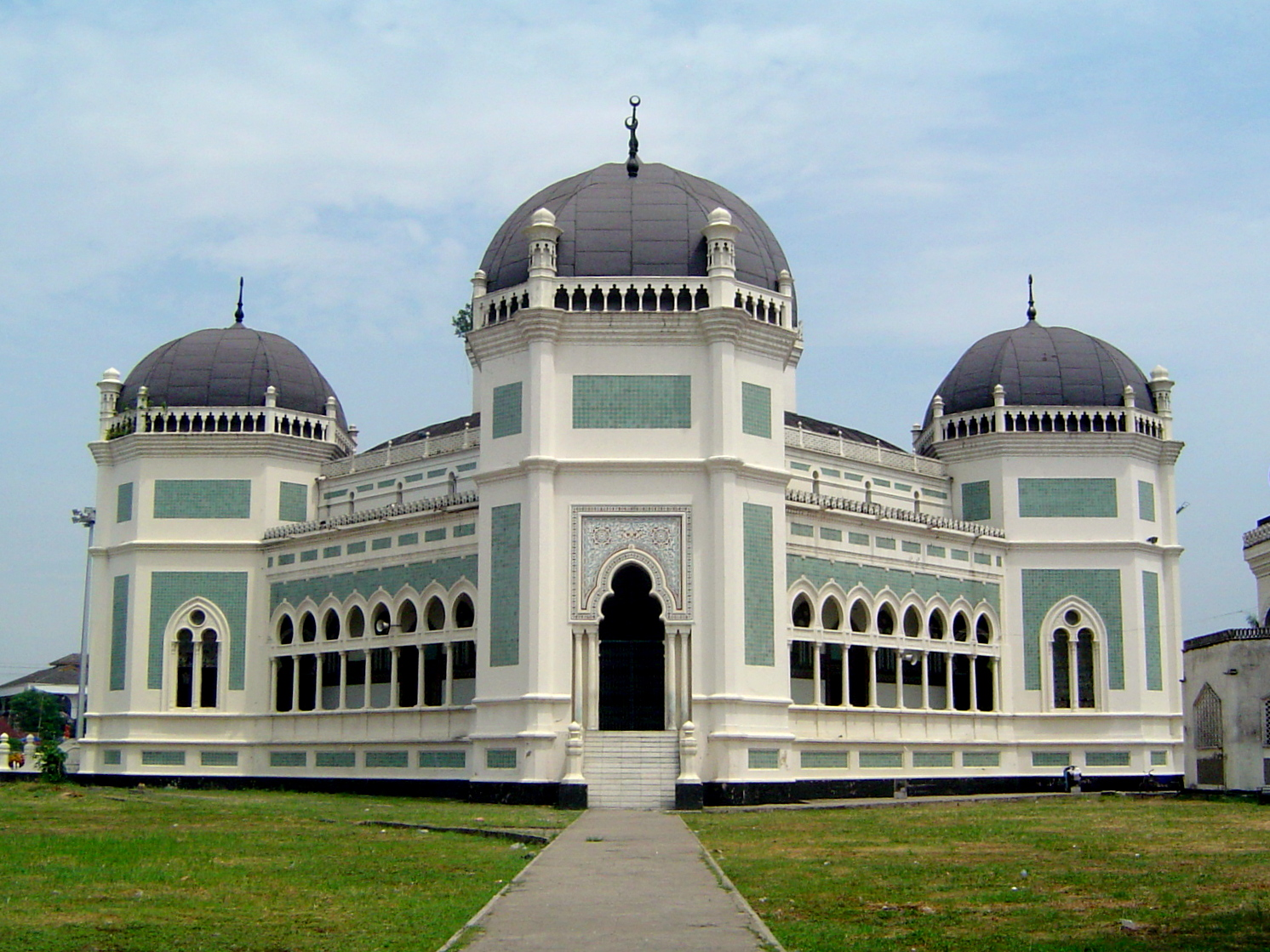
Grand Mosque of Medan, completed in 1909.

=== Post-independence ===
After the establishment of the Republic of Indonesia, many older mosques built in traditional style were renovated and small domes were added to their square hipped roofs. Probably it was built in imitation of similar modifications made to the main mosque in the regional capital nearby.

Since the 1970s, the appropriateness of traditional buildings has been politically acknowledged, and some layered hipped forms have been reinstated. President Suharto contributed to this trend during the 1980s by instigating the Amal Bakti Muslim Pancasila Foundation which subsidized the erection of small mosques in less prosperous communities. The standardized design of these mosques includes three hipped roofs above a square prayer hall, reminiscent of the Great Mosque of Demak.

Today, mosque architecture in Indonesia breaks apart from the multi-tiered traditions of traditional Javanese mosques. Most mosques in Indonesia today follows the Near Eastern influence e.g. Persian, Arabic, or Ottoman style architecture.

Some examples of the post-independence era mosques in Indonesia

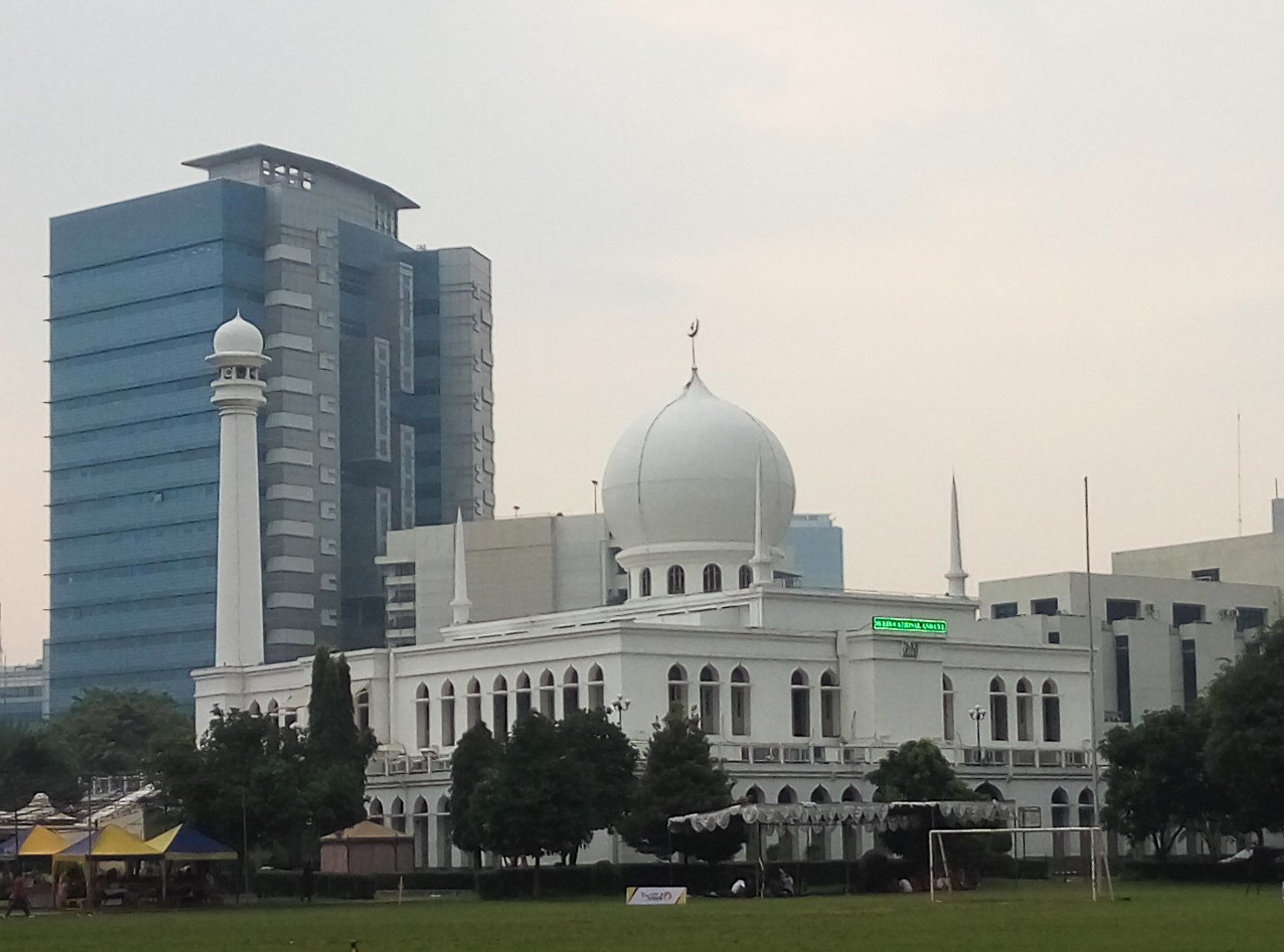
Al-Azhar Great Mosque (1958) in Kebayoran Baru, Jakarta is influenced by the Near East more strongly than the vernacular style.

Great Mosque of Central Java, completed in 2006, shows an eclectic mixture of Javanese, European, and Middle Eastern architectural traditions.

Al-Akbar Mosque with half-egg-shaped dome, Surabaya, completed in 2000.

Grand Mosque of West Sumatra, completed in 2014

== By region ==
=== Java ===
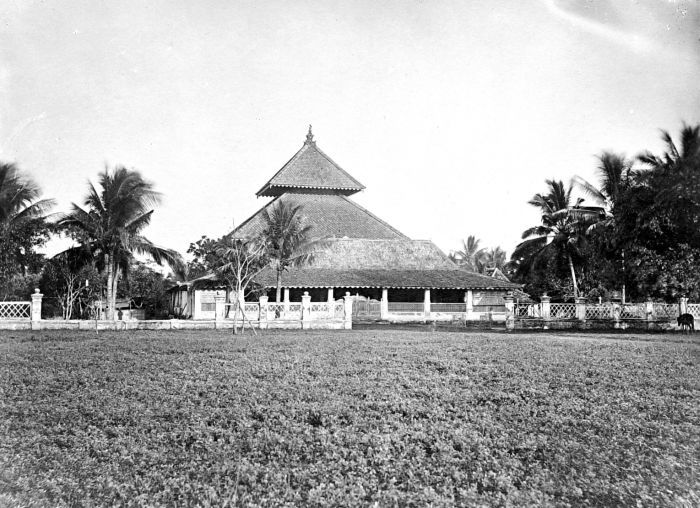
The Great Mosque of Demak, one of the oldest surviving mosques in Indonesia, shows the typical Javanese architecture for the mosque with its multi-tiered roof, a style which will be emulated across the Indonesian archipelago.

The earliest mosques in Java were built in the mid-15th century onwards, although there is an earlier reference to mosques in the 14th-century Majapahit capital.

Most of the earliest mosques in Java typically include multi-tiered roofs. A serambi (roofed porch) attached to the front of the mosque. The minimum number of tiers is two whilst the maximum is five. The top of the roof is decorated with a clay decoration called the mustoko or memolo. Sometimes the roof tiers represent a division into separate floors each of which is used for a different function: the lower floor for prayer, middle floor for study, and top floor for the call to prayer. Minarets were not introduced into Java until the 19th century so that in a one-storeyed mosque, the call to prayer is made from the attached serambi. The highest roof tier is supported by four main pillars, called soko guru. In several of the oldest mosques, one of these pillars is made of wooden splinters held together by metal bands (the significance of which is unknown).

Inside the mosque there is a mihrab in the qibla wall and a wooden minbar. The mihrab niche is made of brick and is highly decorated with deep wood-carving derived from the pre-Islamic art of the area. The enclosure walls are fairly low and decorated with inset bowls and plates from China, Vietnam, and elsewhere. In the middle of the east side, there is a monumental gate. Some mosques, such as the mosque in Yogyakarta, are further enclosed by a moat.

Other characteristics of these early mosques are a peristyle, courtyard, and gates.

=== Sumatra ===
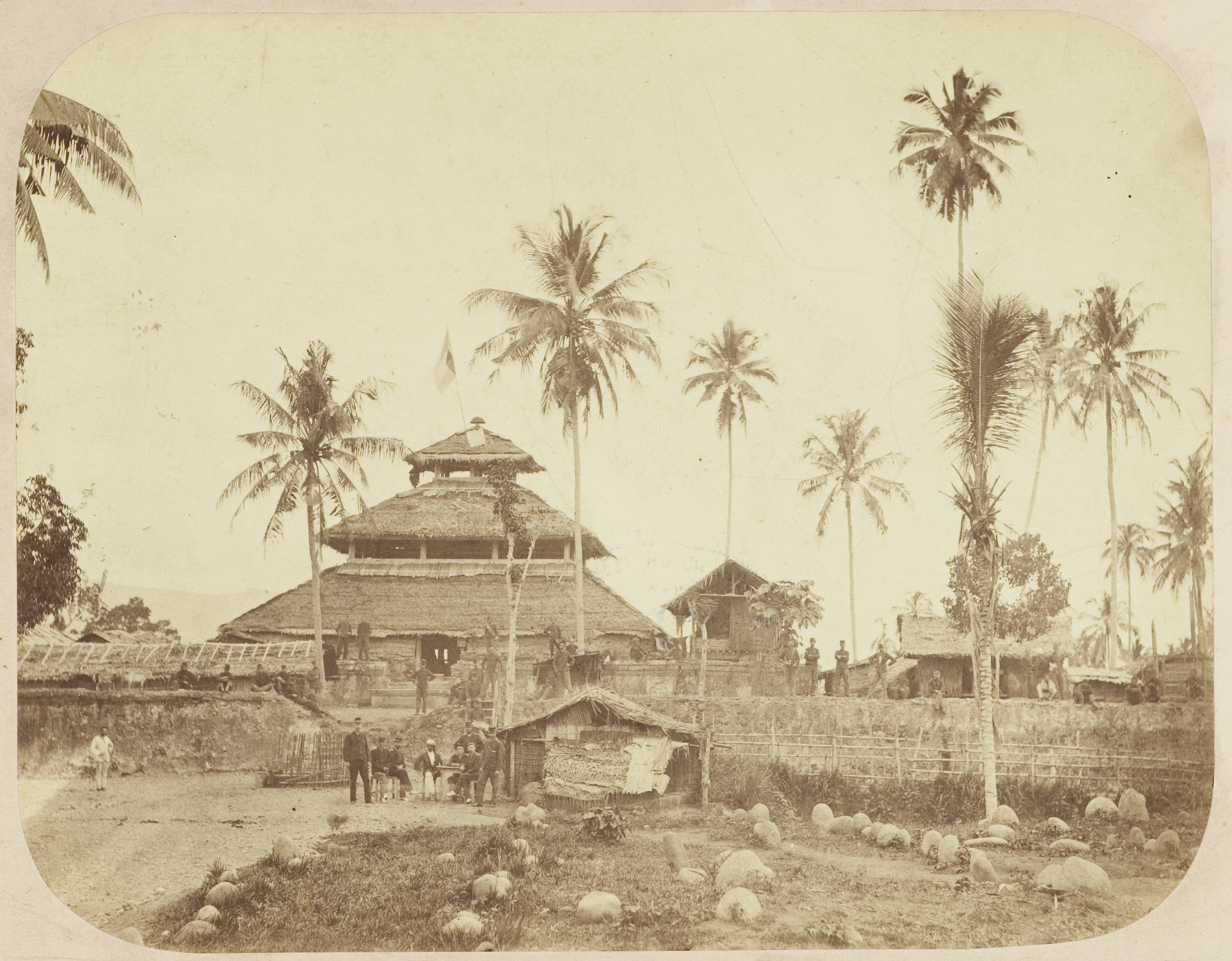
The 17th century Jami Mosque of Indrapuri in Aceh.

Similar to the mosques of Java, Sumatran mosques share the attributes of a Javanese mosque. Some anthropologists consider none of the earliest Islamic structures in Sumatra survived.

In Aceh, the royal mosque was a center of armed resistance to the Dutch in the 1870s and therefore was destroyed in battle. Early prints show it as a structure with wide-hipped roofs similar to those of a mosque still standing in the 17th-century citadel of Sultan Iskandar Muda.

In West Sumatra, mosques, known as surau, conform the local style with the similar three- or five-tiered roofs as the Javanese mosque, but with the characteristic Minangkabau 'horned' roof profile. The roof is supported on ranks of concentric columns, often focusing on towering central support that reaches the apex of the building. Some mosques are built on islands in artificial ponds. Traditional Minangkabau woodcarvings may be implemented in the facade.

Many mosques in Pekanbaru and Riau adopt three- or five-tiered roofs similar to West Sumatra, but with a lack of prominent 'horned' roof profile. This gives the appearance of a Javanese-style mosque but with a taller profile.

=== Kalimantan ===
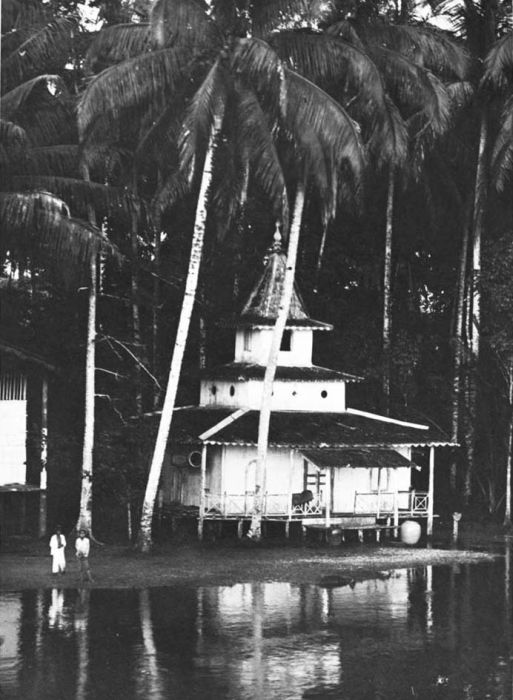
A typical Banjarese mosque with its steep peak roof and stilts.

The kingdom of Banjar in South Kalimantan was the first Hindu kingdom in Borneo to convert into Islam after receiving influence from the Sultanate of Demak of Java. The architectural style of the Banjarese mosque shares similarities with the mosques of the Demak sultanates, especially the Great Mosque of Demak. During the course of history, the Banjar develops its own architectural style. One of the main characteristics of Banjar mosque is the three- or a five-tiered roof with a steep top roof, compared to the relatively low-angled roof of Javanese mosque. Another characteristic is the absence of serambi (roofed porch) in Banjarese mosques, a traditional feature in Javanese mosques. The Banjarese mosque style is similar to the mosques of West Sumatra and is possibly related to other examples from peninsular Malaysia.

Other characteristics are the employment of stilts in some mosques, a separate roof on the mihrab, the peaks of the roof are decorated with finials called pataka (the mustoko/memolo of Demak Sultanates) made of Borneo ironwood, ornaments on the corner of the roofs called jamang, and fences within the perimeter of the mosque area called kandang rasi. Another difference with the mosques of Java is that the Banjarese mosques contain no serambi (roofed porch), a traditional feature in Javanese mosques.

An-Nur Mosque in Kalimas Village of Kaledupa, Tukangbesi Islands, Southeast Sulawesi

Banjar-style mosques can be found in Banjarmasin and Pontianak. The mosque Masjid Tinggi in Bagan Serai, Malaysia, is a Banjar-style mosque.

=== Sulawesi ===
Mosques in Sulawesi follow the architectural style of Javanese mosque with multiple (usually three) tiered roofs.

=== Maluku and Papua ===
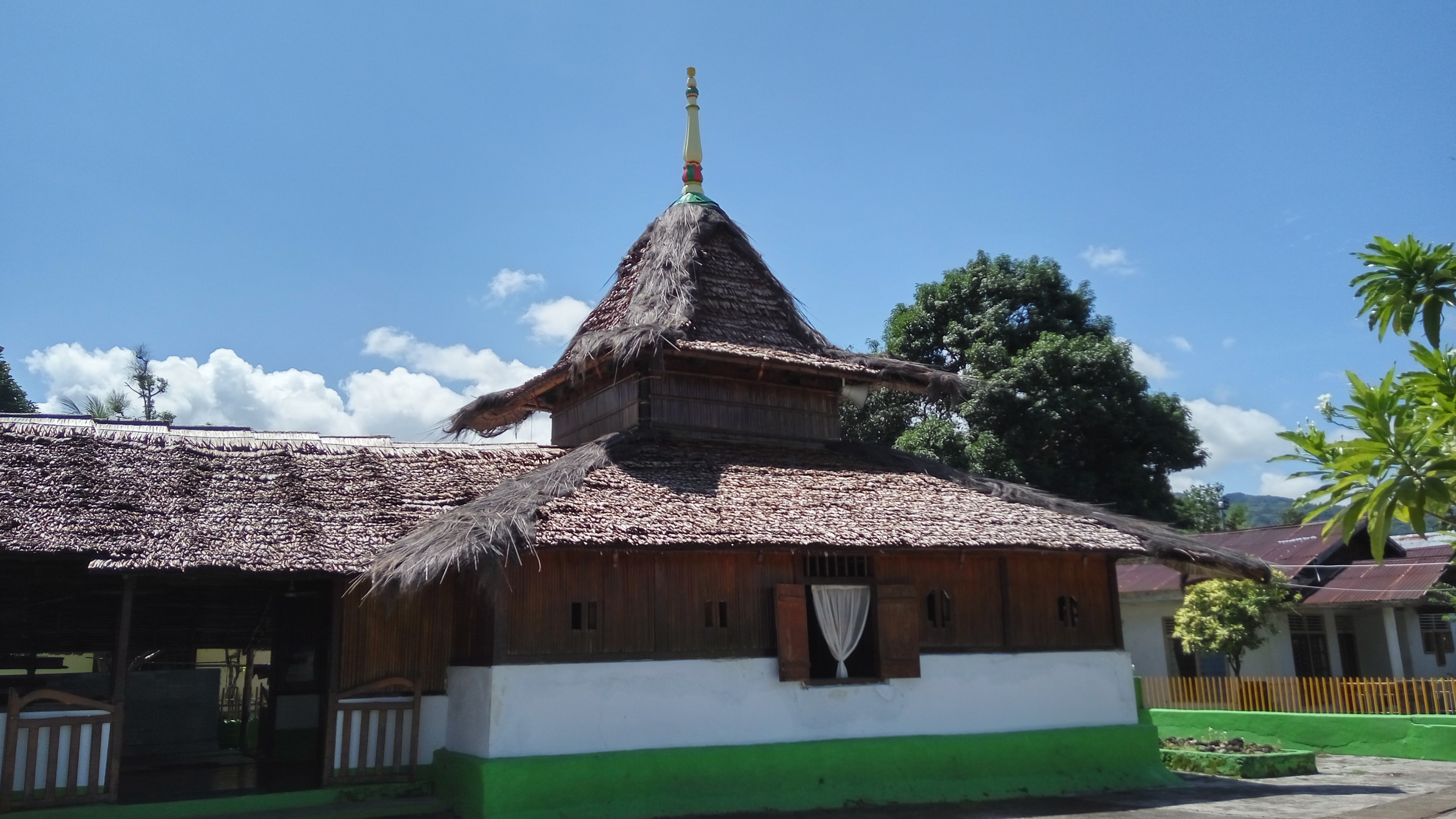
Wapauwe Old Mosque in Ambon island

Islam came to Maluku in the late 15th century via Java, with the strongest impact was felt in the spice islands of Ternate and Tidore. Features in the oldest mosque in the islands, such as the Sultan's Mosque of Ternate, imitate features in the oldest Javanese mosques. However, mosques in Maluku lack a peristyle, terrace, courtyard, and gate, but retain the multi-tiered roof and centralized ground plan of Javanese mosques. The region of Papua contains few significant mosques, as the region is largely Christian.

== See also ==
- List of mosques in Indonesia
- Islam in Indonesia

== Bibliography ==
- Aryanti, Tutin (2024). "The mosques of Southeast Asia: a narrative of representation and negotiation". In Arif, Nasr M.; Panakkal, Abbas (eds.). Southeast Asian Islam: Integration and Indigenisation. London; New York: Routledge. pp. 263–289. ISBN 978-1-032-45169-5.
- PaEni, Mukhlis (2009). Sejarah Kebudayaan Indonesia: Arsitektur (in Indonesian). Jakarta: Raja Grafindo Persada. ISBN 9789797692704.
- Santosa, Revianto Budi; et al. (2025). Ensiklopedia Arsitektur Islam Indonesia. Edisi: Masjid Bersejarah [Encyclopedia of Indonesian Islamic Architecture. Edition: Historic Mosques] (in Indonesian). Jakarta: Kementerian Agama RI. ISBN 978-602-293-252-9.
- Tjahjono, Gunawan (1998). Indonesian Heritage-Architecture. Singapore: Archipelago Press. ISBN 981-3018-30-5.
- Wiryomartono, Bagoes (2009). "A Historical View of Mosque Architecture in Indonesia". The Asia Pacific Journal of Anthropology. 10 (1): 33–45. doi:10.1080/14442210902758715.
- Wiryomartono, Bagoes (2023). Historical Mosques in Indonesia and Malaysia World: Roots, Transformations, and Developments (pdf). Singapore: Springer. ISBN 978-981-99-3805-6.
