= Al-Wustho Mangkunegaran Mosque =

Mosque in Surakarta, Central Java, Indonesia

Al-Wustho Mangkunegaran Mosque Masjid Al-Wustho Mangkunegaran
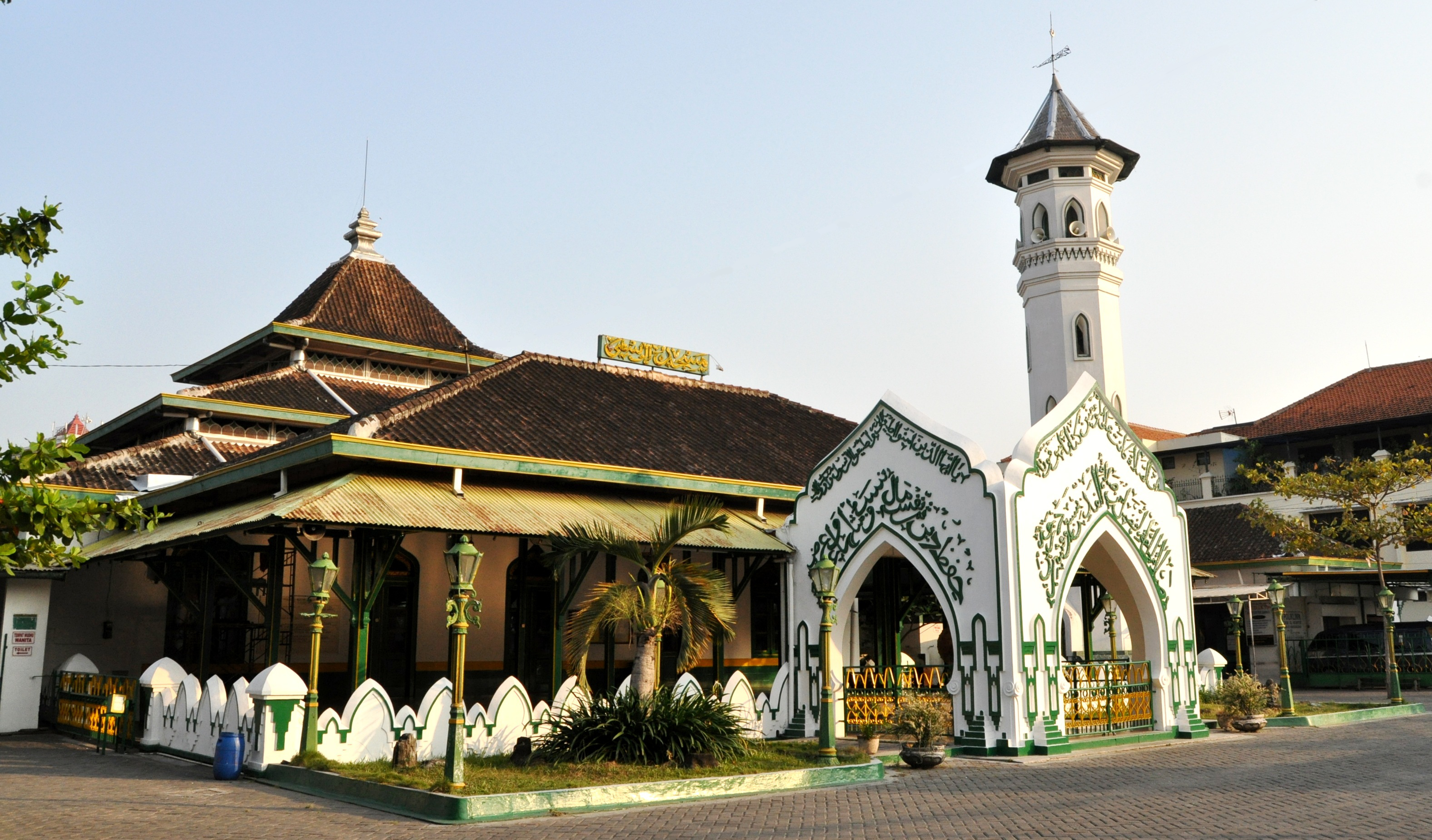

Religion
- Affiliation: Islam
- Branch/tradition: Sunni

Location
- Location: Surakarta, Central Java, Indonesia
- Interactive map of Al-Wustho Mangkunegaran Mosque; Masjid Al-Wustho Mangkunegaran
- Coordinates: 6°14′27″S 106°59′58″E

Architecture
- Type: Mosque
- Style: Javanese architecture
- Groundbreaking: 1878
- Completed: 1918

Specifications
- Capacity: 10,000
- Dome: 1
- Minaret: 1

Al-Wustho Mangkunegaran Mosque is a historic mosque located in the Central Javanese city of Surakarta, to the west of the Mangkunegaran Palace. The mosque is one of the three oldest mosques of Surakarta. Al-Wustho Mangkunegaran Mosque was inaugurated as a state mosque ("masjid nagara") of the Mangkunegaran Palace.

== History ==
The mosque was formerly known as Mangkunegaran Mosque. Construction started in 1878, and the building was completed in 1918, with several parts of the building renovated by Thomas Karsten. Maintenance of the mosque was taken care of by the royal courtier (abdi dalem) of the Mangkunegaran Palace.

The title Al-Wustho was given for the first time in 1949 by the chief (kepala takmir) of the Mangkunegaran Palace, Imam Rosidi. Al-Wustho means "average", which refers to the average size of the Mangkunegaran Mosque, not as large as the Great Mosque of Surakarta but not as small as the Kepatihan Mosque.

== Architecture ==
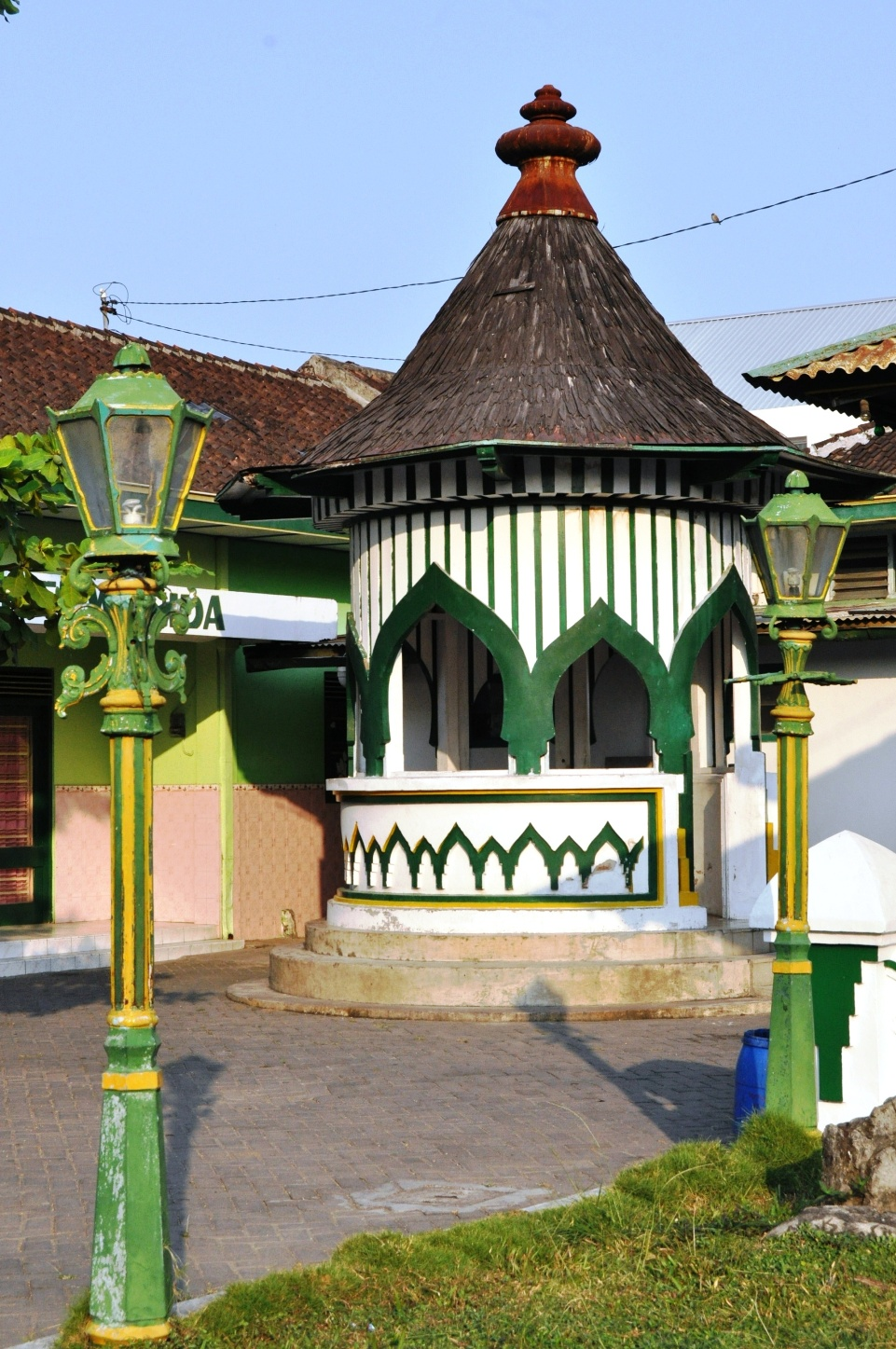
The maligen, a small building where the circumcision ritual is enacted

Al-Wustho Mangkunegaran Mosque of Surakarta is located around 60 metres (200 ft) west of Mangkunegaran Palace. Al-Wustho Mangkunegaran Mosque is designed in a typical Javanese architecture for religious buildings. Like most mosques in Javanese tradition, it features a tajug (pyramid)-styled roof, a traditional roof form that is only reserved for religious building e.g. mosques or temple. The roof contains three tiers and is topped with a mustaka top finial decoration. The roof is supported by four saka guru main posts and twelve supporting posts saka rawa. The saka guru is decorated with Arabic calligraphy at the base.

The mosque has a roofed front porch or serambi to the east of the main hall, one of the main feature of a Javanese mosque. The serambi features a large bedug named Kanjeng Kyai Danaswara. To the south of the main hall is an expansion in the form of a covered porch (pawestren). The covered porch is used as a prayer hall for women.

Similar to the Great Mosque of Surakarta, the front porch features the markis, a kind of portal structure decorated with Arabic calligraphy. The portal is inspired by the Indonesian archaic form of paduraksa, a portal marking the holiest site in a religious building compound.

Al-Wustho Mangkunegaran Mosque has an octagonal minaret 25 metres (82 ft) tall. This minaret is situated to the northeast of the main building. The minaret was built in 1926.

The mosque complex also contains a small building known as the maligen (Javanese for "seat of throne"). The maligen is where the circumcision ritual can be practiced. The maligen was originally built by Mangkunegara V for the circumcision of the royal family of the Mangkunegara court. During the reign of Mangkunegara VII in the early 20th-century, the general public is finally allowed to perform circumcision inside maligen, performed by the Muhammadiyah.

== See also ==
- List of mosques in Indonesia
  - Great Mosque of Surakarta
  - Sheikh Zayed Grand Mosque
- Indonesian Islamic architecture
