= Al-Qadim Mosque =

Mosque in Sibu, Sarawak, Malaysia

- Masjid Al-Qadim
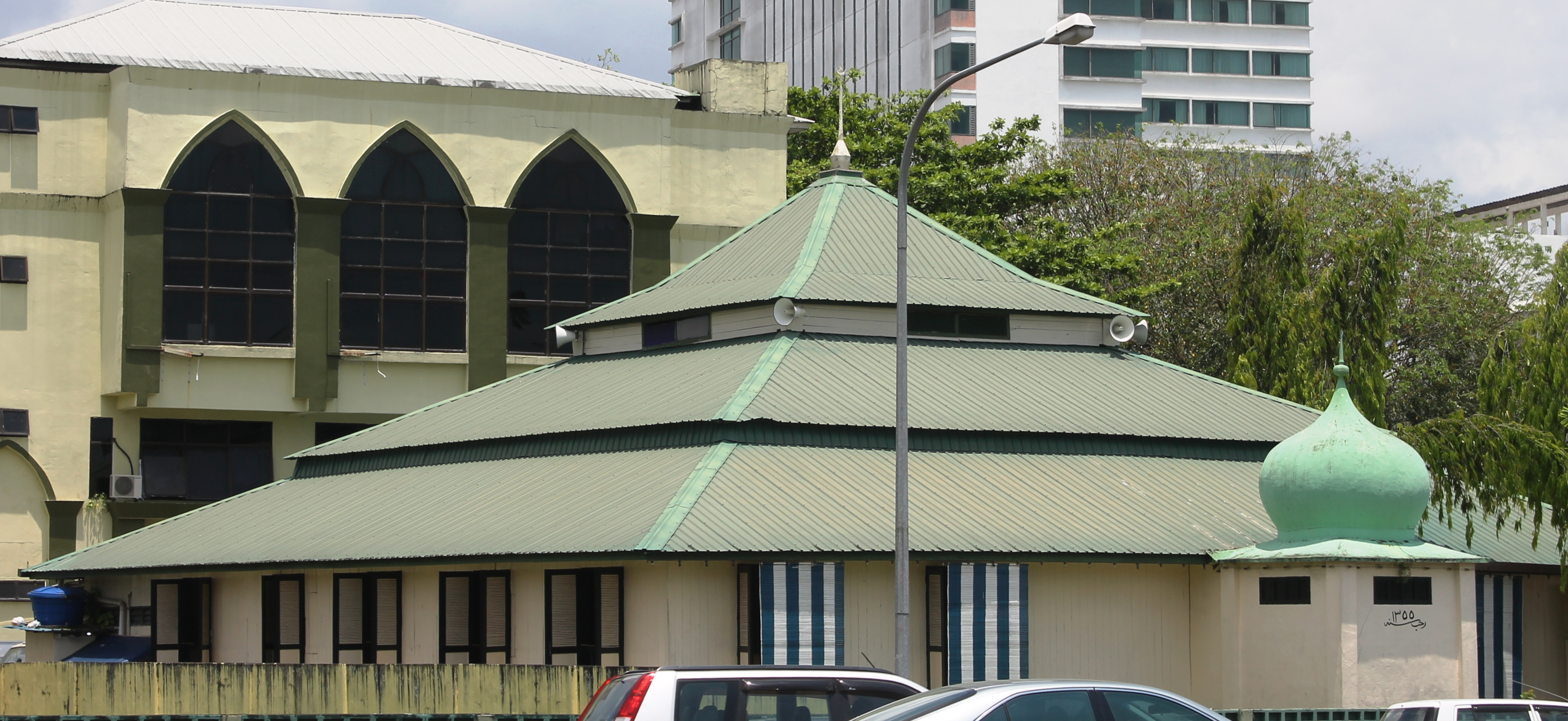

- Location within Sarawak

Religion
- Affiliation: Islam
- Branch/tradition: Sunni

Location
- Location: Sibu, Sarawak, Malaysia
- Interactive map of Al-Qadim Mosque
- Coordinates: 2°17′34.19″N 111°49′29.83″E

Architecture
- Type: mosque
- Minaret: 1

Al-Qadim Mosque (Malay: Masjid Al-Qadim) is a mosque located in Sibu, Sarawak, Malaysia. Built in 1861, it is considered one of the oldest mosque in the state. The mosque is gazetted as Historical Buildings under the Sarawak Cultural Heritage Ordinance 1993.

== History ==
Construction of the mosque began around 1861 by an Islamic scholar from Sumatra, Abdul Salam Minangkabau with the help of the local residents. Over the years, the mosque's construction materials were altered, and it underwent four significant renovations in 1935, 1950, 1968, and 2017. The 2017 restoration of the mosque incurred an estimated cost of RM2.2 million.

The mosque's minaret was demolished during the 1936 renovation and subsequently reconstructed in 2018.

In 2023, Al-Qadim Charitable Trust was established under the Charitable Trusts Ordinance, 1994 (Cap. 7) to manage funds, properties, and activities supporting Al-Qadim Mosque, Islamic education, and charitable purposes for the Muslim community in Sibu, Sarawak.

== Architecture ==
Architecturally, the mosque is a vernacular structure whose main framework is supported by four central pillars built using the “saka guru” system, a feature characteristic of traditional Javanese architecture. The central pillar is carved with Islamic visual art, which is predominantly based on floral patterns. Hence, it is said that the architecture is similar to that of the Demak Great Mosque in Indonesia, particularly in its pillar and roof design.

The mosque was originally constructed using hard timber, locally known as belian (Eusideroxylon zwageri), with a roof made of nipah (Nypa fruticans). Over time, the building materials were modified, and the mosque underwent four major renovations in 1935, 1950, 1968 and 2017. During the 1935 renovation, work commenced on a Mughal-style mihrab and a Neo-classical eclectic main entrance, which were completed in 1936.
