= Sheikh Zayed Grand Mosque, Solo =

Mosque in Surakarta, Central Java, Indonesia

- Masjid Raya Sheikh Zayed, Solo; Jāmiʿ Aš-Šaykh Zāyid Al-Kabīr, Sōlō (جَامِع ٱلشَّيْخ زَايِد ٱلْكَبِيْر، سوْلو)

- Location in Java and Indonesia Sheikh Zayed Grand Mosque, Solo (Indonesia) Sheikh Zayed Grand Mosque, Solo (Asia)

Religion
- Affiliation: Islam
- Branch/tradition: Sunni
- Province: Central Java
- Region: Southeast Asia
- Deity: Allah (God)
- Leadership: Akmal Salim Ruhana, Ministry of Religious Affairs
- Year consecrated: November 14, 2022
- Status: Active

Location
- Location: Solo
- Municipality: Surakarta
- Country: Indonesia
- Administration: Indonesia and the UAE
- Coordinates: 7°33′17.15″S 110°49′36.05″E

Architecture
- Architects: Arkonin; Airmas Asri
- Type: Congregational mosque
- Style: Middle Eastern, with a hint of Moroccan architecture
- Founder: Indonesia and the U.A.E.
- Funded by: United Arab Emirates
- General contractor: Waskita Karya
- Completed: 28 February 2023
- Construction cost: Rp 313.1 billion (US$ 20 million)

Specifications
- Direction of façade: Qiblah
- Capacity: 10,000 people
- Dome: 82
- Minaret: 4
- Site area: 8,000 square metres (86,000 ft^{2})

The Sheikh Zayed Grand Mosque, Solo (Arabic: جَامِع ٱلشَّيْخ زَايِد ٱلْكَبِيْر، سوْلو, romanized: Jāmiʿ Aš-Šaykh Zāyid Al-Kabīr, Sōlō; Indonesian: Masjid Raya Sheikh Zayed, Solo) is a mosque in Solo, Indonesia, which is a smaller replica of the grand mosque in Abu Dhabi, the U.A.E. Built at a cost of US$ 20 million (Rp 313.1 billion), it is named in honour of the UAE's founder, Sheikh Zayed bin Sultan Al Nahyan.

== History ==
Sheikh Mohamed bin Zayed Al Nahyan, who was then the Crown Prince of Abu Dhabi, visited Indonesia in July 2019 and offered the mosque as a gift to President Joko Widodo. Construction began on Monday, 8 March 2021.

On November 14, 2022, President Widodo and his Emirati counterpart, Sheikh Mohamed, inaugurated the grand mosque. It was completed on Tuesday the 28th of February, 2023.

== Structure ==
View of the inner courtyard of the Sheikh Zayed Mosque in Surakarta

The mosque occupies an area of 8,000 square metres (86,000 ft^{2}), and can accommodate about 10,000 worshippers. It has 4 minarets and 82 domes in total. Of these, a large central dome is surrounded by 4 smaller ones. The main prayer area has 32 columns. There is also a center for training clerics, which is sponsored by the UAE.

== See also ==
- List of mosques in Indonesia
  - Al-Wustho Mangkunegaran Mosque
  - Great Mosque of Surakarta
