= Grand Mosque of West Sumatra =

Mosque in Padang, West Sumatra, Indonesia

Sheikh Ahmad Khatib Al-Minangkabawi Grand Mosque
- Masjid Raya Syekh Ahmad Khatib Al-Minangkabawi

- Location within Indonesia

Religion
- Affiliation: Islam
- Branch/tradition: Sunni
- Province: West Sumatra
- Status: Active

Location
- Location: Padang, Indonesia
- Coordinates: 0.924234°S 100.362492°E

Architecture
- Architect: Rizal Muslimin
- Type: Mosque
- Capacity: 20,000

Website
- masjidraya.sumbarprov.go.id

Grand Mosque of West Sumatra (Indonesian: Masjid Raya Sumatera Barat) is a mosque in Padang, West Sumatra, Indonesia. It is the largest mosque in West Sumatra and the second-largest mosque in Sumatra. It is located in Padang Utara Subdistrict, Padang, West Sumatra. The Grand Mosque of West Sumatra is located within a complex of 40,345 square meters at the intersection of Jalan Khatib Sulaiman and Jalan Ahmad Dahlan.

== Construction ==
The first stone of the construction was laid on December 21, 2007, inaugurated by the Governor of West Sumatra Province, Gamawan Fauzi.

Construction took a long time because of budget issues. Apart from relying on West Sumatra's regional government budget, other strategies were used to collect funding, such as relying on donations from the people, the private sector, and foreign governments. In 2009 The government of Saudi Arabia funded 50 million US dollars for the construction of the mosque, however this came at the same time as the 2009 West Sumatra earthquakes, so the funding was relocated for rehabilitation of the earthquake victims and reconstruction process of West Sumatra instead. In 2014, the Turkish government donated rugs for the mosque.

Prayers were held in the mosque for the first time on February 7, 2014.

== Architecture ==
The mosque was designed by local architect Rizal Muslimin, selected as the winner of the 2007 competition for a new mosque in West Sumatra. The competition had 323 participants from around the world.

The most distinctive feature of the mosque is its roof form, a contemporary interpretation of the traditional roof of the Minangkabau vernacular houses. The shape of the roof is also meant to symbolize the cloth that was held by its corners by the four clan leaders of the Quraysh tribe to lift the Black Stone to the current spot in Mecca. The roof frame is constructed of steel pipes, supported by four curving concrete columns.

The main building consists of three floors. The main prayer hall is located on the second floor. The mosque is able to accommodate 20,000 people.

== See also ==
- Rumah Gadang
- Indonesian mosques
- List of mosques in Indonesia

== Works cited ==
- Daniswari, Dini (18 January 2022). "Mengenal Masjid Raya Sumbar, Masjid Tahan Gempa yang Memenangkan Desain Terbaik Dunia" [Get to know the Great Mosque of West Sumatra, an earthquake-resistant mosque that won the world's best design]. Kompas.com (in Indonesian).
- Krisma Purwoko (June 12, 2010). "Rp 400 M Bantuan Gempa Arab Saudi Peruntukannya Ditentukan Bappenas" [Bappenas Specified the Purpose of Saudi Arabia Fund of USD 400 M for Earthquake Relief]. Republika (in Indonesian).
