= Great Mosque of Surakarta =

Mosque in Surakarta, Central Java, Indonesia

- Masjid Agung Kraton Surakarta
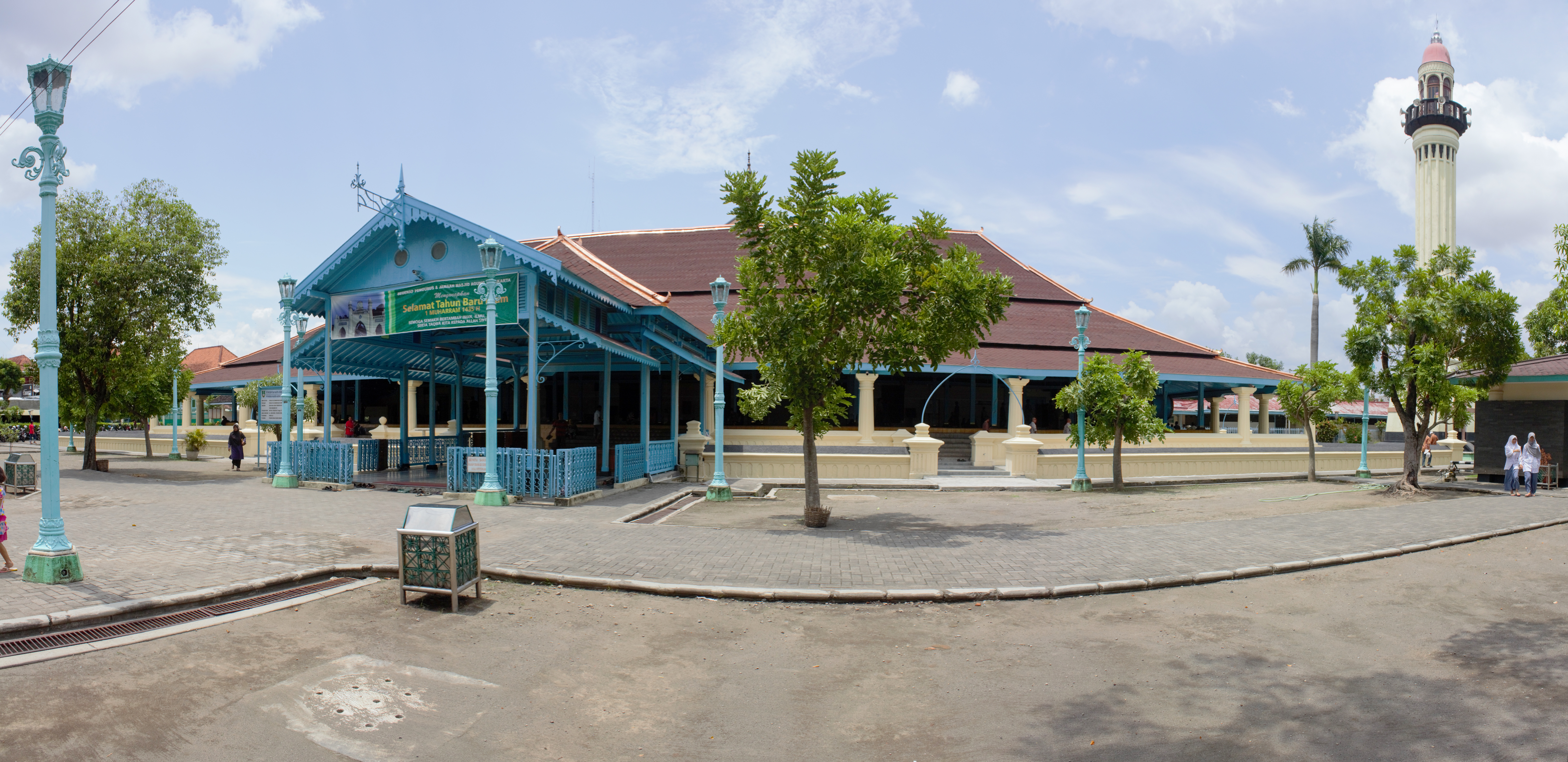

Religion
- Affiliation: Islam
- Branch/tradition: Sunni
- Province: Central Java
- Status: Active

Location
- Location: Surakarta, Central Java, Indonesia
- Interactive map of Great Mosque of Surakarta
- Coordinates: 7.574477°S 110.826611°E

Architecture
- Type: Mosque
- Style: Javanese vernacular
- Groundbreaking: 1763
- Completed: 1768

Specifications
- Direction of façade: East
- Minaret: 1

The Great Mosque of Surakarta (Indonesian: Masjid Agung Surakarta; Javanese: Masjid Ageng Karaton Surakarta Hadiningrat) is an 18th-century Javanese mosque in Surakarta, Central Java, Indonesia. It is the royal mosque of the Surakarta Sunanate.

== History ==
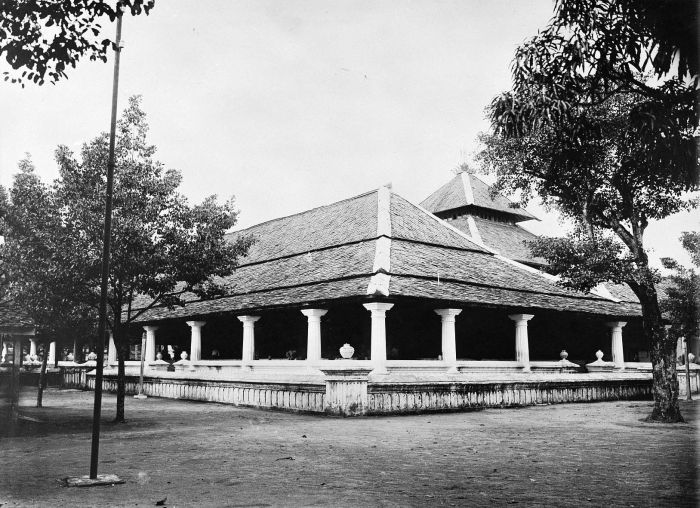
The Great Mosque of the Kraton of Surakarta.

The construction of the Great Mosque of Surakarta was begun by Sunan Pakubuwono III in 1763. The mosque was completed in 1768. It served both as a jami mosque (mosque for Friday prayer) and a royal mosque (mosque for ceremonies or rituals related to the royals). Traditionally, the mosque also served as the seat of judiciary in matters of religious significance.

The fence was added for the mosque complex in 1858 during the reign of Sunan Pakubuwono VIII. A Mughal architecture-inspired minaret was built in 1928 during the reign of Sunan Pakubuwono XI.

== The mosque ==
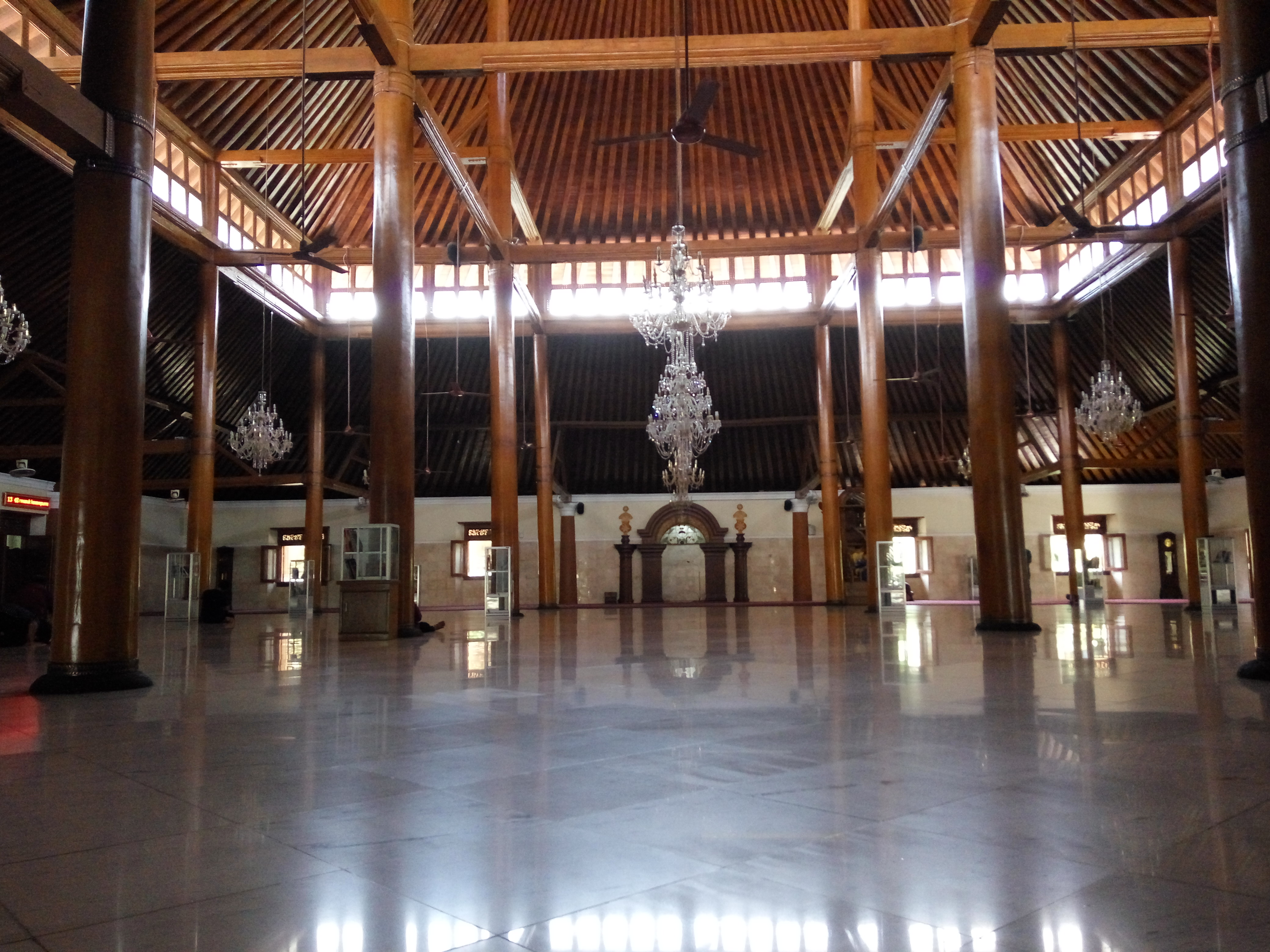
The interior of Great Mosque of Surakarta

Surakarta Great Mosque is located within a 19,180 sqm complex surrounded by a solid wall. The design of the Great Mosque of Surakarta follows a conservative Javanese architecture principle. It basically consists of two buildings: the main prayer hall and the front hall (serambi). The main prayer hall has seven doors connecting it with the serambi. Four main posts (Javanese soko guru) supported the roof of the main prayer hall. This roof is a pyramidal tajug-styled roof, a type of roof traditionally reserved for sacred buildings in Javanese architectural principle. The roof is three-tiered, topped with a mustaka (rooftop ornament). As a royal mosque, there is a maksura to the left of the mihrab. A maksura is a place for the ruler of the kraton to perform prayer. In case of the Great Mosque of Surakarta, the maksura has a small hip roof.

In front of the main prayer hall is the front hall, known as the serambi. The serambi is basically a porch-like structure semi-attached to the front facade of the main prayer hall. The serambi kept two bedugs (Javanese drum to call prayer) and a large wooden kentongan. Another porch-like semi-attached building flanked the main prayer hall to its left and right, this is called the pawestren. The pawestren is used as women's praying room.

The minaret was located to the northeast of the mosque. The design is based on Qutb Minar of Delhi.

== The vicinity ==
Following the traditional Javanese city planning, the mosque is located facing the northern alun-alun of the kraton of the Kasunanan of Surakarta. To the south of the mosque is the Pasar Klewer ("Klewer Market"). The traditional kampung of Kauman, known for its batik craftsmanship, is located north of the Great Mosque.

== See also ==
- List of mosques in Indonesia
  - Al-Wustho Mangkunegaran Mosque
  - Sheikh Zayed Grand Mosque

== Works cited ==
- Gunawan Tjahjono (1998). Gunawan Tjahjono (ed.). Religion and Ritual. Indonesian Heritage. Vol. 9. Singapore: Archipelago Press. ISBN 9813018585.
- Muna Zakiah (August 12, 2013). "Masjid Agung Surakarta" [Surakarta Great Mosque]. Kebudayaan Indonesia (in Indonesian). Direktorat Jenderal Kebudayaan Republik Indonesia. Archived from the original on November 13, 2015.
