= Wapauwe Old Mosque =

Mosque in Maluku, Indonesia

- Masjid Tua Wapauwe

Religion
- Affiliation: Islam
- Branch/tradition: Sunni
- District: Leihitu Subdistrict
- Province: Maluku
- Status: Active

Location
- Location: Kaitetu Village, Central Maluku, Maluku, Indonesia
- Interactive map of Wapauwe Old Mosque
- Coordinates: 3.585226°S 128.084243°E

Architecture
- Type: Mosque
- Style: Vernacular Indonesian
- Completed: 1414 (established); 1895 (last major renovation)

Specifications
- Length: 10 metres (33 ft)
- Width: 10 metres (33 ft)
- Materials: Thatched dried sago fronds

Wapauwe Old Mosque (Indonesian Masjid Tua Wapauwe or Masjid Tua Wapauwe) is a historic mosque in Kaitetu village, located in the Wawane Mountains on the north part of cape Keitetu, Central Maluku, Maluku, Indonesia. Established in 1414, it is the oldest mosque in the Moluccas and possibly the oldest mosque in Indonesia which has been maintained in its original state.

== Description ==
Wapauwe Mosque is located in the historic village of Kaitetu where remnants of Portuguese buildings lie such as a Portuguese church and a Portuguese trading post which was later reestablished by the Dutch as a fort. The humble-sized wooden mosque is maintained by both the Christian and Muslim community of the village. The 15th century mosque has been maintained by keeping its original wooden form, using no nails but tied with ijuk fiber ropes.

== History ==
The first Wapauwe Mosque was established in Kampung Wawane, about 6 kilometers from its present place, in 1414. Its founder, Maulana Kiai Pati, was an Islamic missionary from the coast of Nukuhaly, Seram Island. This original mosque is constructed of sago frond walls and palm leaf roof. Kiai Pati converted five villages in the Wawane Mountains, namely the villages of Essen, Wawane, Atetu, Nukuhaly and Tehala. In 1464, another group of Muslims led by Kyai Jamilu from the Sultanate of Jailolo, on the island of Halmahera in North Maluku. Jamilu continued the maintenance of the Wawane Mosque during his time in the village, as well as redeveloping the building into a larger mosque.

The Dutch arrived in early 17th-century and controlled Wawane. To avoid tension with the Dutch, in 1614 Imam Rijali, a descendant of Jamilu, led the exodus of the villagers to the village of Tehala, about 6 km east of Wawane. During the exodus, the Wawane Mosque was dismantled and transported to the new place. The mosque was reconstructed on a plain where many wild mango trees grow. The mosque then received its present name Wapauwe Mosque, after the mango (wapa means "wild mango", and uwe means "tree" in local Kaitetu language). Nowadays, some locals believe that the mosque moved magically by itself to Wapauwe.

The first major renovation of the mosque was in 1664 when it was twice transported and rebuilt without any changes to its original appearance. In the beginning of the 18th century, a spire on top of the mosque was installed. The spire represents the Arabic letter alif, a letter that symbolizes Allah. The second major renovation was in 1895 when a porch was added to the front and to the east of the original mosque. The renovation in 1895 also installed lime concrete reinforcement on the lower side of the wooden wall, and replaced the original coral gravel-layered floor with cement. The 1895 restoration was initiated by a local figure named Hamid Iha.

Several minor renovations were undertaken during the post-colonial period without changing its appearance. In 1977, the Armed Forces' Military Districts of the area, the Komando Daerah Militer XVI/Pattimura, installed fences along the periphery. In 1982, the mosque was designated as a Cultural Property. An official plaque was installed and inaugurated by the Head of the Indonesian Institute of Sciences, Bachtiar Rifai. In the 1990s, the roof thatch was replaced with similar material. This restoration involved two dusun ("township") of Kaitetu village, Dusun Hila Kristen (a Christian majority) and Dusun Kalauli. The restoration was led by Head of the Adat Ir. H. Abdullah Lumaela. In 1993, the charity work of the 733rd Airborne Battalion undertook the construction of additional facilities, such as porches, pump wells, and garden ponds. Since 1995, the mosque is equipped with a loudspeaker from a government bank. The most recent restoration work of the mosque took place in March 2008 when the roof thatch was replaced again.

== Treasury ==
The mosque kept one of the oldest Qur'anic mus'hafs in Indonesia; the oldest of these is a mus'haf written by Imam Muhammad Arikulapessy - the mosque's first imam - which was completed in 1550 with no miniature decoration. The other is a mus'haf written by Nur Cahya, completed in 1590. Nur Cahya is the granddaughter of Arikulapessy and a student of the mosque's founder Kiai Pati. There were also other historic manuscripts kept inside the mosque such as a Muslim calendar from Gregorian year 1407 and a manuscript for a Friday Prayer in year 1661. All these treasuries are now kept in the heritage house of Abdurrachim Hatauwe, the twelfth descendant of Arikulapessy.

The mosque also stored a poetry book about Muhammad's life. The poem is sung regularly by the villagers, especially during the annual Mawlid.

Other objects stored in the mosque were two oil lamps made of wood and brass, wooden scales, and beduk carved of lingua wood.

== Architecture ==
The original wooden construction of the mosque is retained, using no nails or pegs. The main mosque is about 10 x 10 meters wide with an additional porch of roughly 40 square meters. The architectural style follows the typical traditional mosque architecture in Indonesia with multi-tiered roofs, supported with the saka guru pillars, and no minaret.

The multi-tiered roof is supported with four main columns known as the saka guru. The roof is topped with a wooden tip mounted perpendicular to the top. These main pillars were made of kanjoli or bintanggur wood (Calophyllum soulattri) which grows in abundance in the coastal area of Tanah Hitu.

The walls are covered in gaba-gaba (dried sago fronds) as well as the thatched roof.

The wooden main door is decorated with spearhead-shaped wooden ornaments inscribed with calligraphic writings of God and Muhammad on its four corners, and a turtle-shaped brass plate etched with a Salawat invocation.

== See also ==
- List of mosques in Indonesia

== Works cited ==
- Endang Sukendar (November 5, 2005). "MASJID WAPAUWE - Buah Kerukunan Islam-Kristen" [Wapauwe Mosque - The Fruit of Muslim & Christian's Harmony]. Gatra - Geliat Negeri Sejuta Masjid (in Indonesian). 51. PT Era Media Informasi. Archived from the original on June 28, 2017.
- Friska Yolandha (14 April 2012). "Masjid Wapauwe: Rumah Allah Tertua di Indonesia Timur" [Wapauwe Mosque: Oldest House of Allah in East Indonesia]. Republika (in Indonesian). Jakarta.
- Paisal (February 27, 2012). "The Wapauwe Old Mosque: 598 Years Stretching the Age". Al-Qalam (in Indonesian). 18 (1). Jurnal Al-Qalam. Archived from the original on July 15, 2017.
- Zein, Abdul Baqir (1999). Masjid-masjid bersejarah di Indonesia [Historic mosques in Indonesia] (in Indonesian). Gema Insani. ISBN 9789795615675.
