= Demak Great Mosque =

15th-century mosque in Demak, Central Java, Indonesia

- Masjid Agung Demak
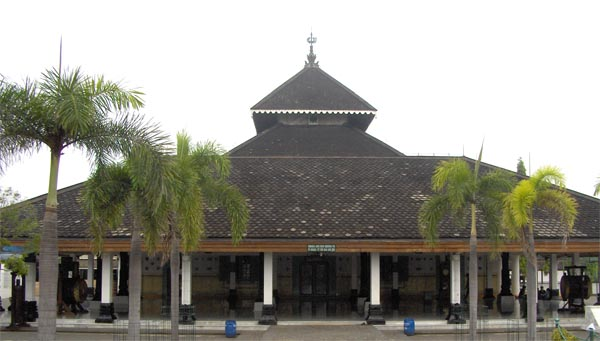

Religion
- Affiliation: Islam
- Branch/tradition: Sunni
- Province: Central Java
- Region: Demak

Location
- Location: Jalan Sultan Fatah, Bintoro Demak, Central Java, Indonesia
- Interactive map of Demak Great Mosque
- Administration: Demak government
- Coordinates: 6.8947°S 110.6373°E

Architecture
- Architect: Sunan Kalijaga
- Style: Javanese
- Completed: 1479(?)
- Minaret: None

Demak Great Mosque (Indonesian: Masjid Agung Demak) is one of the oldest mosques in Indonesia, located in the center town of Demak, Central Java, Indonesia]. The mosque is believed to have been built by the Wali Songo ("Nine Muslim Saints") with the most prominent figure, Sunan Kalijaga, during the first Demak Sultanate ruler, Raden Patah, during the 15th century.

== Features ==
Although it has had several renovations, it is thought to be largely in its original form except for the addition of a verandah or surambi in the nineteenth century. It is a classic example of a traditional Javanese mosque. Unlike mosques in the Middle East, the Demak Great Mosque is built from timber. Rather than a dome, which did not appear in Indonesian mosques until the 19th century, the roof is tiered and supported by four saka guru teak pillars. The tiered roof shows many similarities with wooden religious structures from the Hindu-Buddhist civilizations of Java and Bali. The main entrance of Masjid Agung Demak consists of two doors carved with motifs of plants, vases, crowns, and an animal head with an open wide-toothed mouth. It is said that the picture depicts the manifested thunder caught by Ki Ageng Selo, hence their name Lawang Bledheg (the doors of thunder). Like other mosques of that era, its orientation towards Mecca is only approximate.

== Carving and historical relics ==
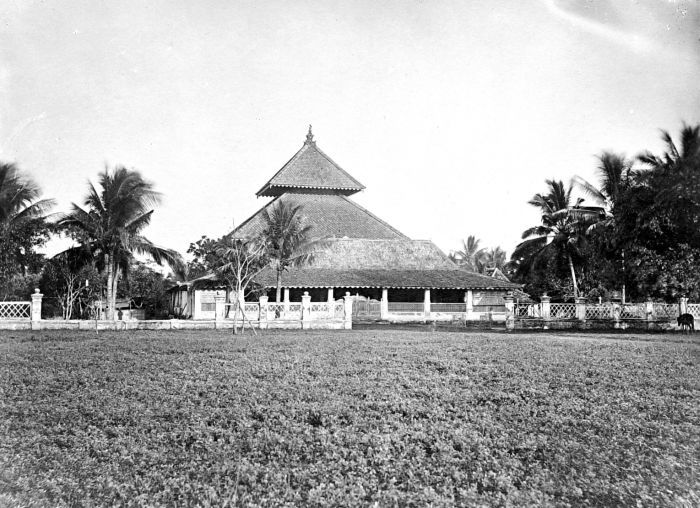
Masjid Agung Demak at the end of the 19th century

Its walls contain Vietnamese ceramics. With their shapes derived from conventions of Javanese woodcarving and brickwork, they are thought to have been specially ordered. The use of ceramic rather than stone is thought to have been in imitation of the mosques of Persia.

== Gallery ==
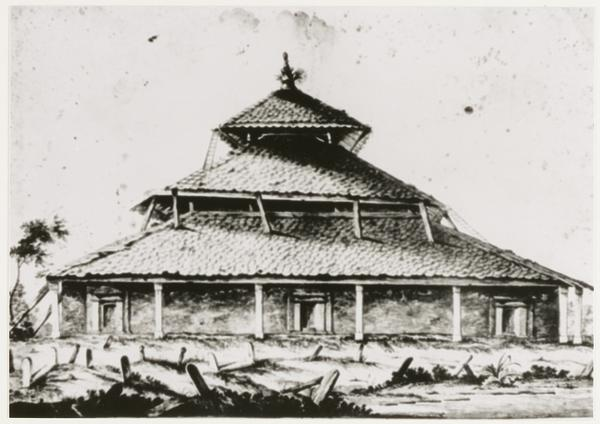
Demak Great Mosque, Java in 1810, KITLV 29489

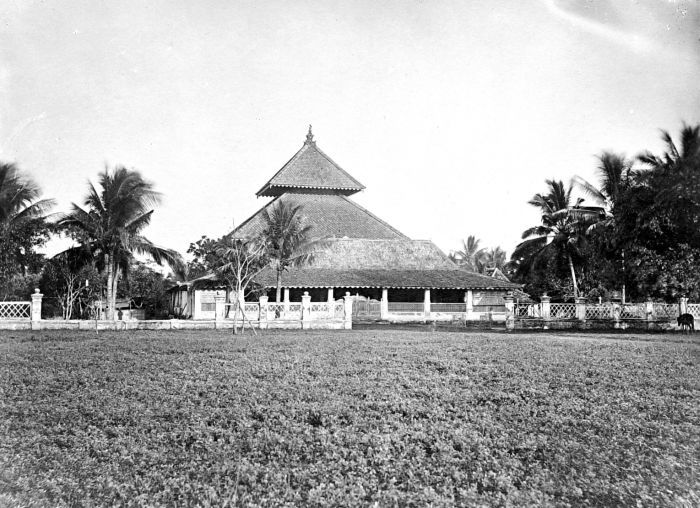
Masjid Agung Demak, end of 19th century

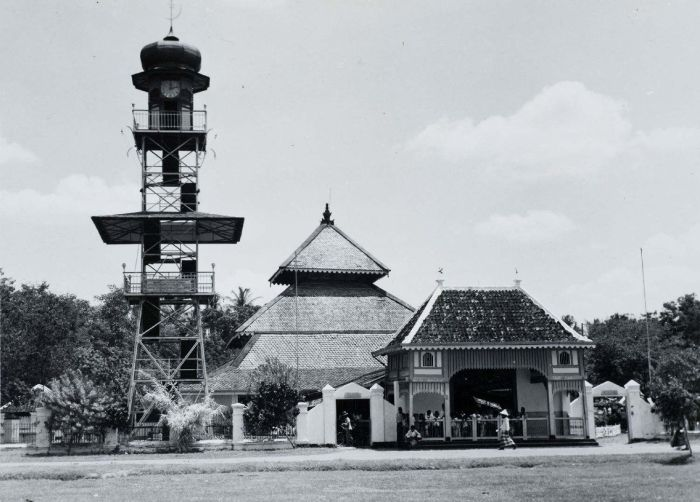
1920-1939

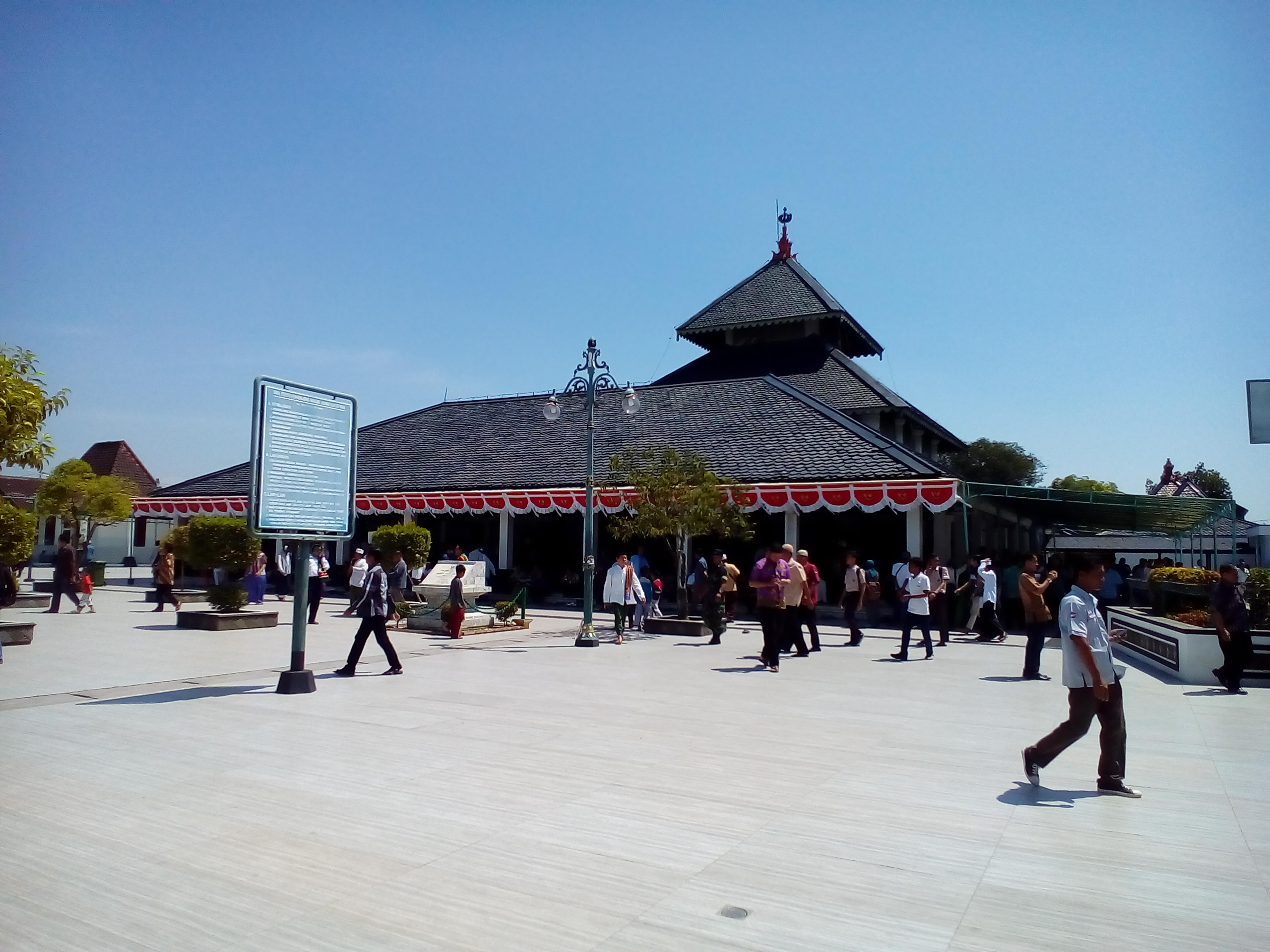
August 2016

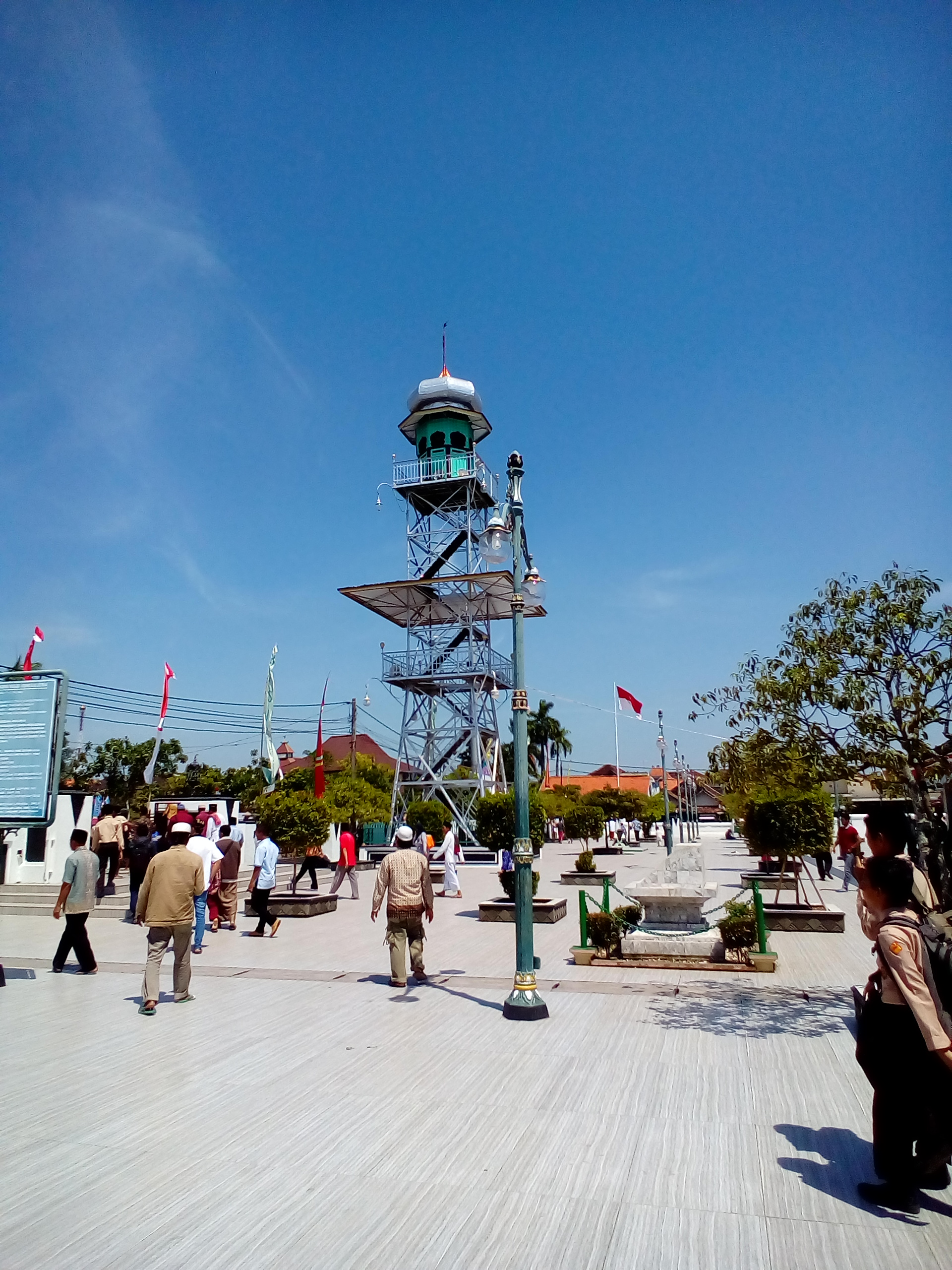
Minaret, August 2016

== See also ==
- Islam in Indonesia
- Indonesian architecture
