= Minangkabau Malaysians =

Malaysian nationals of Minangkabau-descents

Malaysians of Minangkabau origin
Orang Minangkabau Malaysia Urang Minangkabau Malaysia مينڠكاباو مليسيا
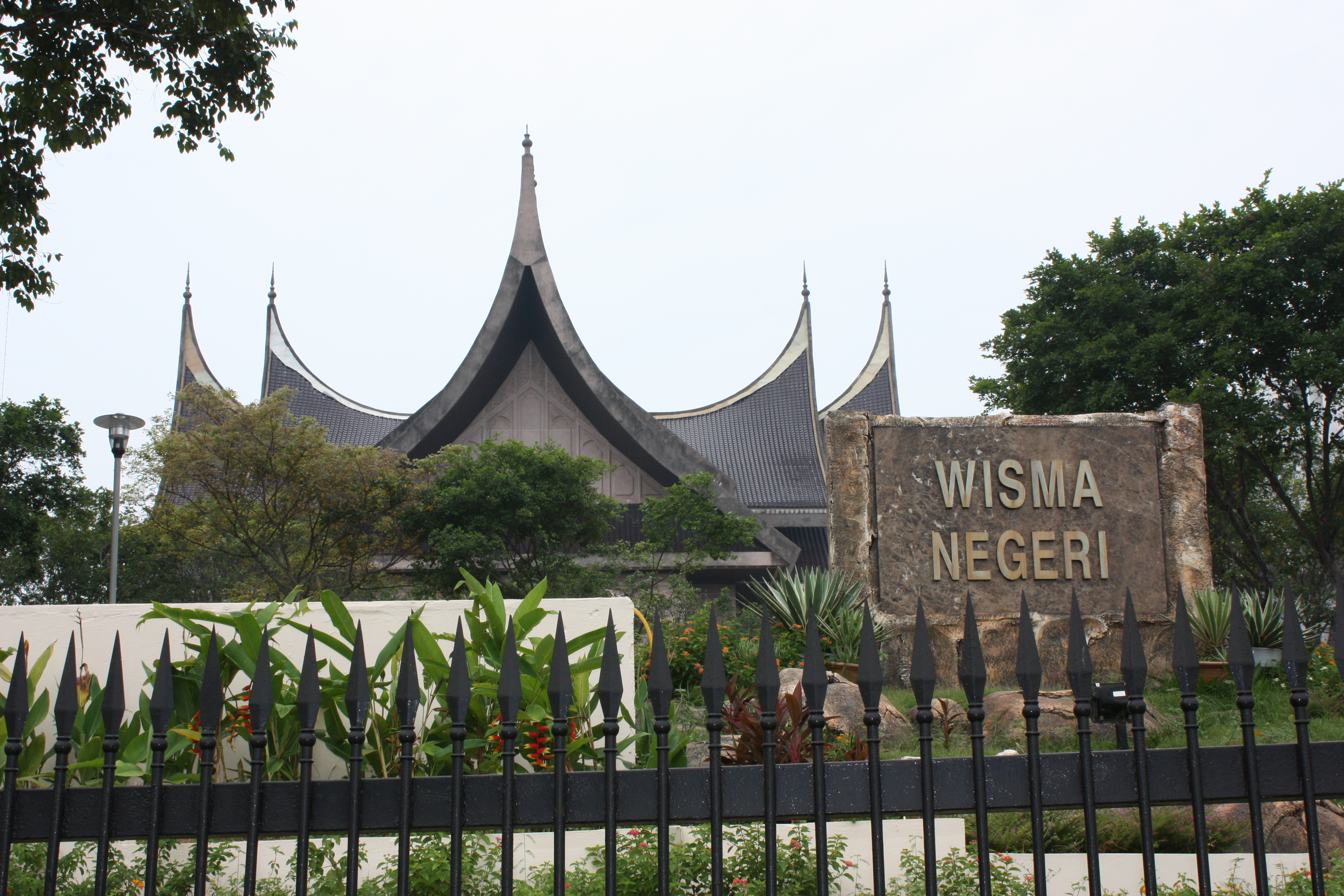
- Wisma Negeri, Negeri Sembilan

Total population
- 989,000

Regions with significant populations
- Mostly in the Malay Peninsula

Languages
- Majority: Malaysian; Minority: Minangkabau

Religion
- Sunni Islam

Related ethnic groups
- Malaysian Malays, Malay Singaporeans, and Indonesians

The Minangkabau Malaysians are citizens of the Malaysia whose ancestral roots are from Minangkabau of central Sumatra. This includes people born in the Malaysia who are of Minangkabau origin as well as Minangkabau who have migrated to Malaysia. Today, Minangkabau comprise about 989,000 people in Malaysia, and Malaysian law considers most of them to be Malays. They are majority in urban areas, which has traditionally had the highest education and a strong entrepreneurial spirit. The history of the Minangkabau migration to Malay peninsula has been recorded to have lasted a very long time. When the means of transportation were still using the ships by down the rivers and crossing the strait, many Minang people migrated to various regions such as Negeri Sembilan, Malacca, Penang, Kedah, Perak, and Pahang. Some scholars noted that the arrival of the Minangkabau to the Malay Peninsula occurred in the 12th century. This ethnic group moved in to peninsula at the height of the Sultanate of Malacca, and maintains the Adat Perpatih of matrilineal kinships system in Negeri Sembilan and north Malacca.

Malaysia has the largest Overseas Minangkabau population outside of Indonesia and the relationship between Minangkabau communities in both countries remained close. In 2014, Pertubuhan Jaringan Masyarakat Minangkabau Malaysia (Minangkabau Malaysian Association) in Kuala Lumpur was established to represent the Minangkabau community in the country, although it is mostly represented by Minangkabaus in Selangor and Kuala Lumpur while Negeri Sembilanese, Talu and Rawa people maintained their own associations.

== Regions ==
=== Negeri Sembilan ===
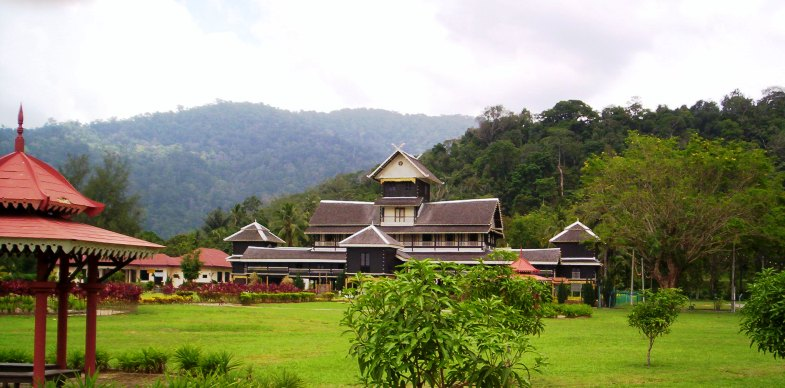
Istana Seri Menanti

The Minangkabau people are quite dominant in Negeri Sembilan, in terms of population, politics, and culture. At the early 14th century, the Minangkabau arrived in Negeri Sembilan. Intermarriage between Minangkabau and Orang Asli created the new clan, Biduanda. The initial migration of the Minangkabau people mostly came from the Tanah Datar and Lima Puluh Kota regencies.

Prior to the establishment of the Yang di-Pertuan Besar institution, Negeri Sembilan was under the auspices of the Sultanate of Johor. In 1773, Negeri Sembilan took Raja Melewar to Pagaruyung, and became a separate kingdom from Johor. Until 1820s, the leaders of Minangkabau communities derived their authority directly from their Sumatran homeland. Present day, Yang di-Pertuan Besar of Negeri Sembilan is the Minangkabau of Pagaruyung descent. They are elected by a council of ruling chiefs in the state, or the Undangs. Due to the implementation of the Adat Perpatih, the Minangkabau of Negeri Sembilan still inherit their tribes and inheritance based on the matrilineal line.

=== Penang ===
Minangkabau have settled in Penang island since the early 18th century. The first known Minangkabau settlers were Nakhoda Bayan, Nakhoda Intan, and Nakhoda Kecil. They received the appropriate permissions by Ahmad Tajuddin, the sultan of Kedah, and then opened up the settlements in Bayan Lepas, Balik Pulau, Gelugor, and Tanjung (now George Town). Other Minang traders, Datuk Jannaton and Datuk Maharaja Setia who came in 1749, opened up Batu Uban area. In the 20th century, many Minang merchants were running printing businesses, such as Yusof Rawa and Hussamuddin Yaacob. One of the most prominent Minang of Penangites is Hamdan Sheikh Tahir. He was the Yang di-Pertua Negeri (literally "head of state") of Penang from 1989 to 2001.

=== Selangor ===
Minangkabau arrivals in Selangor was relatively recent compared to Negeri Sembilan or Penang. They arrived in Selangor around the mid of 19th century as a result of the Padri War. At that time, migrating to Klang (pai ka Kolang) was popular among the Minang young people. The first group of Minang people came to Selangor, most of whom were mining businessmen, such as Haji Mohamed Taib, Khatib Koyan, and Bagindo Samah. Minangkabau migration to Selangor increased dramatically in the late 1940s due to Indonesian independence war. They primarily became merchants and shop-owners. In the Greater Kuala Lumpur many of them have fashion stores and restaurant. Currently, Minangkabau restaurant, known as Nasi Padang Restaurant, is one of the most visible food stalls in Selangor.

== Sub-Groups of Minangkabau Malaysians ==
Even though Minangkabaus in Malaysia share a common cultural and linguistic origins but due to hundreds of years of isolation from its Sumatran counterparts, several populations of Minangkabau people in the Malay Peninsula have developed their own distinct cultural and ethnic identities because of contacts and intermarriages with local Malays. Most of these groups no longer identified themselves as ethnically Minangkabaus.

=== Negeri Sembilan Malays ===
The Malays of Negeri Sembilan (Ughang Nogoghi) are the largest matrilineal group in Malaysia and are a mixture of Peninsular Malay, Minangkabau and Orang Asli ancestry. Their traditional areas are based on the nine historical regions (locally known as luak) which spans not only in Negeri Sembilan but also in northern Melaka, northwest Johor, southwest Pahang and southeast Selangor. While there is already a historical Malay and Orang Asli community in Negeri Sembilan prior to Minangkabau migration in the 16th century, the Minangkabau people have made a profound impact on the cultures, traditions, and socio-political landscape of Negeri Sembilan. Negeri Sembilan was first founded in 1773 after it declared its independence from Johor Empire and appoints a Pagaruyung prince, Raja Melewar as the first Yamtuan Besar.

=== Rawa ===
Rawa people or Rao are a distinct ethnic Malay-Minangkabau community which can mainly be found in Perak but also in several villages across Kedah, Penang, Pahang and Selangor. They are the descendants of Minangkabau migrants that migrated to the Malay peninsula in the 18th century from Rao Mapat Tunggul in modern day West Sumatra. The largest concentration of Rawa people is in Gopeng where there is a museum dedicated to Rawa Malays. The Rawa people no longer practiced clan (suku) and matrilineal (adat perpatih) traditions and have only maintained several traditions and dialect of Rao Mapat Tunggul. Rawa people no longer identified themselves as Minangkabau but as Rawa Malays (Melayu Rawa/Rao).

=== Selangorian Minangkabaus ===
Unlike their Negeri Sembilan and Rawa kins, the Minangkabaus in Selangor still maintain their kinship ties to West Sumatra and still call themselves as Minangkabau. However, their spoken dialect has also evolved over time due to the influences of Standard Malay and other languages spoken in the country but it remains closer to Standard Minangkabau compared to Rawa and Negeri Sembilan Malay.

=== Talu ===
The Talu Malays are the smallest group of Minangkabaus living in Malaysia, they migrate from Nagari Talu in Talamau, West Sumatra to the Malay peninsula in the 19th and early 20th century. They mostly live in Tronoh which is a small town in Perak. Despite their small size, they still maintain their dialect, culture and kinship ties with their relatives in West Sumatra.

== Notable people ==
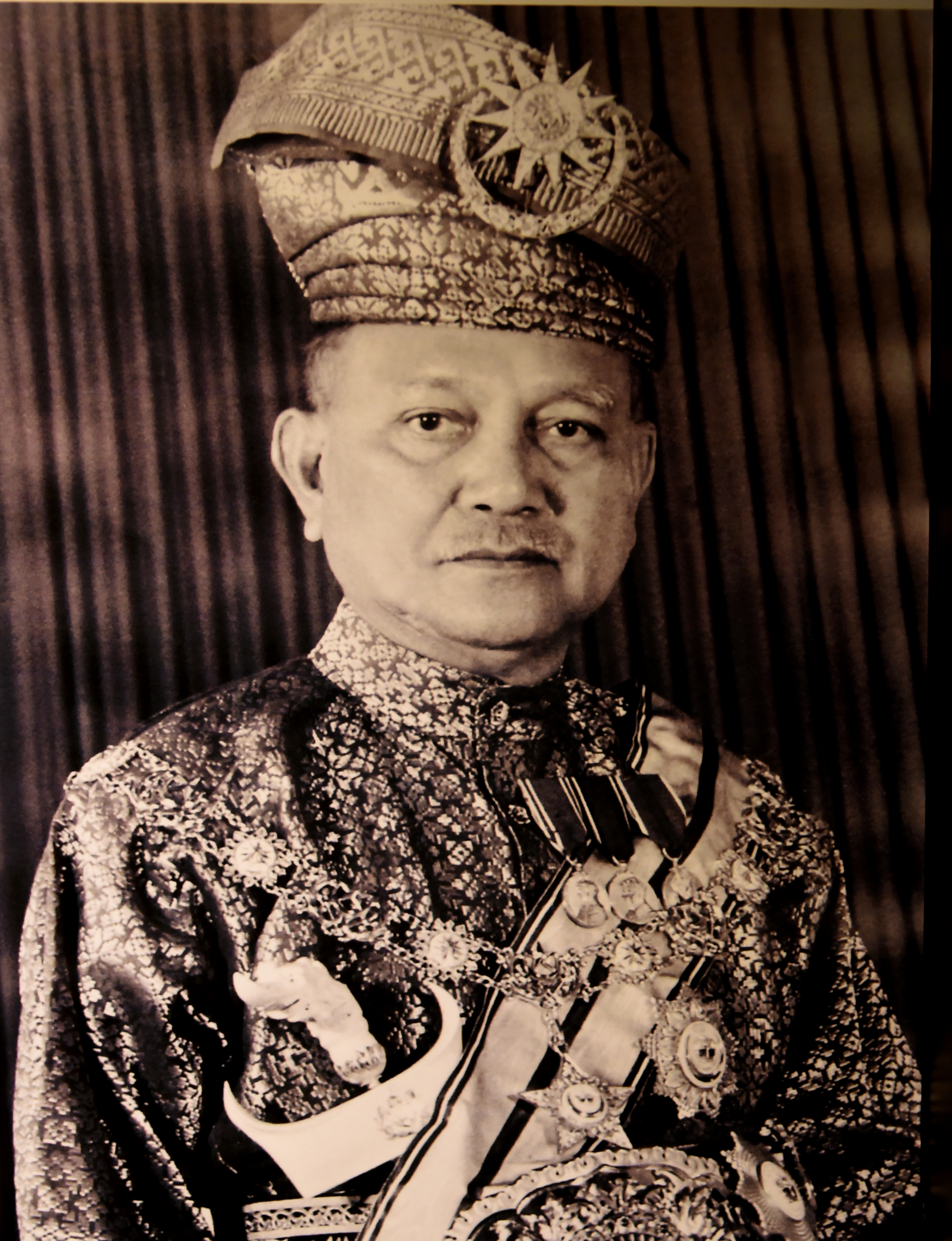
Tuanku Abdul Rahman

There are many Minangkabau people who work as merchants, clerics, authors, and politicians who have made great contributions in Malaysia. In the 19th century, Muhammad Saleh Al-Minangkabawi became the mufti of the Perak Sultanate and Uthman bin Abdullah became the first qadi in Kuala Lumpur. In addition, Haji Mohamed Taib, who has a fairly large business, became one of the developer Chow Kit area in Kuala Lumpur, as well as Abdul Rahim Kajai, a leading pioneer of Malay journalism. In the mid-20th century, Minangkabau descents are a distinctive and influential group in the nation's politics. Tuanku Abdul Rahman was appointed as the first Yang di-Pertuan Agong of the Federation of Malaya. Besides that, many Minang figures became Malaysian party leaders. Some of them were Abdullah C.D., Ahmad Boestamam, Burhanuddin al-Hilmi, Shamsiah Fakeh, Khadijah Sidek, and Mokhtaruddin Lasso.

After Malaysian independence, many Malaysian ministers are Minangkabau descent, such as Abdul Aziz Shamsuddin, Abdul Samad Idris, Aishah Ghani, Amirsham Abdul Aziz, Aziz Ishak, Ghazali Shafie, Khairy Jamaluddin, Muhammad bin Haji Muhammad Taib, Rais Yatim, Shaziman Abu Mansor and Mohamad Hasan. Interestingly, Malaysia's longest serving minister is Rafidah Aziz, Perak-born of Minang descent. Some prominent Malaysian businessmen are Minang people, namely Nasimuddin Amin, Kamarudin Meranun, and Tunku Abdullah. In addition to politicians and merchants, Minangkabau people who are quite meritorious include Zainal Abidin Ahmad, author and language experts; Tahir Jalaluddin, influential Islamic scholar; Muszaphar Shukor, first Malaysian astronaut; U-Wei Haji Saari, one of Malaysia's best film directors; Ismail Mohamed Ali, governor of Bank Negara Malaysia; Abdul Aziz Zainal, commander-in-chief of the Malaysian Armed Forces, as well as Saiful Bahri, the prominent of Malaysia's composer.

== See also ==
- Indonesian Malaysians
- Minangkabau in Singapore
