= Ahmad Khatib al-Minangkabawi =

Minangkabau Islamic teacher (1860–1915)

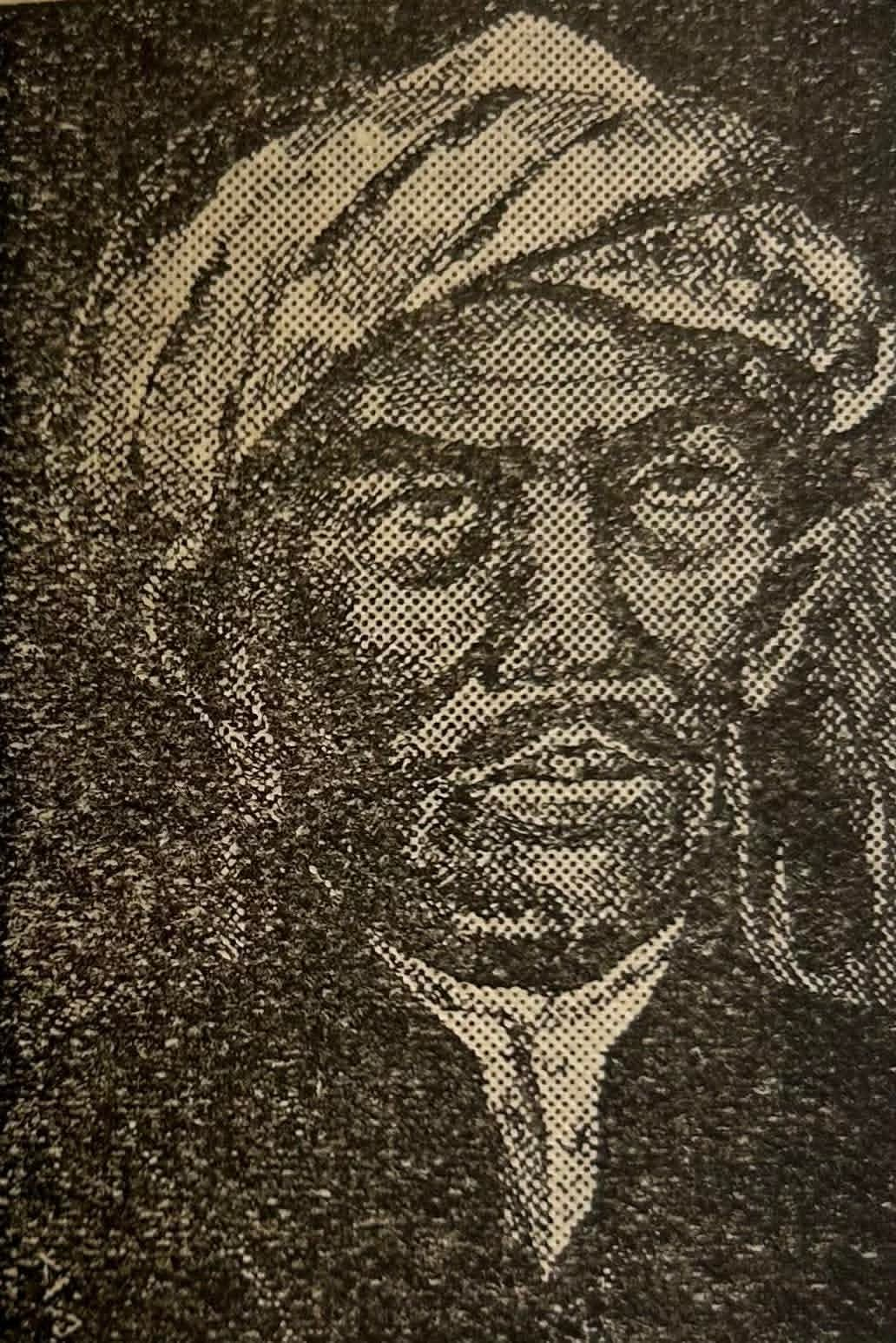

Personal life
- Born: Ahmad Khatib bin Abdul Latif bin Abdullah bin Abdul Aziz al-Minangkabawi al-Jawi al-Makki asy-Syafi'i al-Asy'ari; 26 June 1860 Koto Tuo, Dutch East Indies
- Died: 9 October 1915 (aged 55) Mecca, Ottoman Empire
- Main interest(s): Islamic Jurisprudence, Hadith, Islamic Reform
- Notable idea: Reconciliation of Minangkabau matrilineal system with Islamic inheritance laws
- Notable work(s): Hasyiyah An Nafahat ‘ala Syarhil Waraqat lil Mahalli, Al Jawahirun Naqiyyah fil A’malil Jaibiyyah, Ad Da’il Masmu’ ‘ala Man Yuwarritsul Ikhwah wa Auladil Akhwan Ma’a Wujudil Ushul wal Furu’, Raudhatul Hussab, Mu’inul Jaiz fi Tahqiq Ma’nal Jaiz

Religious life
- Religion: Sunni Islam
- Creed: Shafi'i

Senior posting
- Influenced by: Ahmad Zayni Dahlan, Umar bin Muhammad bin Mahmud Syatha al-Makki asy-Syafi’i
- Influenced: Ahmad Dahlan, Hasyim Asyari, Sulaiman ar-Rasuli

Shaikh Ahmad Khatib al-Minangkabawi (26 June 1860 – 9 October 1915) was a Minangkabau Islamic teacher. He was born in Koto Tuo, Dutch East Indies, and died in Mecca, Ottoman Empire. He served as the head (imam) of the Shafi'i school of law at the mosque of Mecca (Masjid al-Haram). He was known for being a teacher of Islamic reformist leader Ahmad Dahlan, who founded Muhammadiyah Society and Hasyim Asyari, who founded Nahdlatul Ulama in the early 20th century.

Although Ahmad Khatib was an orthodox Sunni Muslim, he still hoped to reconcile the matrilineal system in Minangkabau with the laws of inheritance prescribed in the Quran. Through his Minangkabau students who studied in Mecca as well as those he taught in Indonesia, he encouraged a modified Minangkabau culture based on al-Quran and the Sunnah.

== Biography and family ==
Khatib was born on 26 June 1860 in Koto Tuo, Ampek Angkek, Agam Division, West Sumatra in the then Dutch East Indies.

His parents were Abdullatief Khatib and Limbak Urai. In 1870 he attended a Dutch school and then continued his studies at Kweekschool in Bukittinggi, Sumatra. Later, he moved to the Ottoman Empire to receive a nominal Islamic education under the guidance of the local jurists and settled in Mecca for the rest of his life.

His eldest son Abdulkareem owned a bookstore in Makkah. While his other son Abdulmalik Alkhatib was an ambassador of the Ashraf to Egypt. Another of his sons, Sheikh Abdulhameed Alkhateeb, was the first Saudi Arabian ambassador to the Islamic Republic of Pakistan. His grandson, Fouad Abdulhameed Alkhateeb, was a Saudi Arabian ambassador, humanitarian, author, and businessman. In his capacity as a diplomat, he represented his homeland in Pakistan, Iraq, the United States of America, Nigeria, Turkey, Bangladesh, Nepal, and finally as Saudi ambassador to Malaysia.

== Books ==
Arabic language:

- Hasyiyah An Nafahat ‘ala Syarhil Waraqat lil Mahalli
- Al Jawahirun Naqiyyah fil A’malil Jaibiyyah
- Ad Da’il Masmu’ ‘ala Man Yuwarritsul Ikhwah wa Auladil Akhwan Ma’a Wujudil Ushul wal Furu’
- Raudhatul Hussab
- Mu’inul Jaiz fi Tahqiq Ma’nal Jaiz
- As Suyuf wal Khanajir ‘ala Riqab Man Yad’u lil Kafir
- Al Qaulul Mufid ‘ala Mathla’is Sa’id
- An Natijah Al Mardhiyyah fi Tahqiqis Sanah Asy Syamsiyyah wal Qamariyyah
- Ad Durratul Bahiyyah fi Kaifiyah Zakati Azd Dzurratil Habasyiyyah
- Fathul Khabir fi Basmalatit Tafsir
- Al ‘Umad fi Man’il Qashr fi Masafah Jiddah
- Kasyfur Ran fi Hukmi Wadh’il Yad Ma’a Tathawuliz Zaman
- Hallul ‘Uqdah fi Tashhihil ‘Umdah
- Izhhar Zaghalil Kadzibin fi Tasyabbuhihim bish Shadiqin
- Kasyful ‘Ain fi Istiqlal Kulli Man Qawal Jabhah wal ‘Ain
- As Saifu Al Battar fi Mahq Kalimati Ba’dhil Aghrar
- Al Mawa’izh Al Hasanah Liman Yarghab minal ‘Amal Ahsanah
- Raf’ul Ilbas ‘an Hukmil Anwat Al Muta’amil Biha Bainan Nas
- Iqna’un Nufus bi Ilhaqil Anwat bi ‘Amalatil Fulus
- Tanbihul Ghafil bi Suluk Thariqatil Awail fima Yata’allaq bi Thariqah An Naqsyabandiyyah
- Al Qaulul Mushaddaq bi Ilhaqil Walad bil Muthlaq
- Tanbihul Anam fir Radd ‘ala Risalah Kaffil ‘Awwam,
- Hasyiyah Fathul Jawwad
- Fatawa Al Khathib ‘ala Ma Warada ‘Alaih minal Asilah
- Al Qaulul Hashif fi Tarjamah Ahmad Khathib bin ‘Abdil Lathif

Indonesian language:

- Mu’allimul Hussab fi ‘Ilmil Hisab
- Ar Riyadh Al Wardiyyah fi Ushulit Tauhid wa Al Fiqh Asy Syafi’i
- Al Manhajul Masyru’ fil Mawarits
- Dhaus Siraj Pada Menyatakan Cerita Isra’ dan Mi’raj
- Shulhul Jama’attain fi Jawaz Ta’addudil Jumu’attain
- Al Jawahir Al Faridah fil Ajwibah Al Mufidah
- Fathul Mubin Liman Salaka Thariqil Washilin
- Al Aqwal Al Wadhihat fi Hukm Man ‘Alaih Qadhaish Shalawat
- Husnud Difa’ fin Nahy ‘anil Ibtida’
- Ash Sharim Al Mufri li Wasawis Kulli Kadzib Muftari
- Maslakur Raghibin fi Thariqah Sayyidil Mursalin
- Izhhar Zughalil Kadzibin
- Al Ayat Al Bayyinat fi Raf’il Khurafat
- Al Jawi fin Nahw
- Sulamun Nahw
- Al Khuthathul Mardhiyyah fi Hukm Talaffuzh bin Niyyah
- Asy Syumus Al Lami’ah fir Rad ‘ala Ahlil Maratib As Sab’ah
- Sallul Hussam li Qath’i Thuruf Tanbihil Anam
- Al Bahjah fil A’malil Jaibiyyah
- Irsyadul Hayara fi Izalah Syubahin Nashara
- Fatawa Al Khathib

== See also ==
- Islam in Indonesia
- List of Minangkabaus
- Overseas Minangkabau
