= Puti Bungsu =

Puti Bungsu is the name of the character that is found in the story of the Minangkabau people of West Sumatra. Puti Bungsu, according to local folklore, is one of seven daughters who came from the sky. Puti, the youngest character in the folklore of West Sumatra, is also called the daughter who fell from the sky, along with one of the king's wives.
