= Suntiang =

Crown worn by Minangkabau women

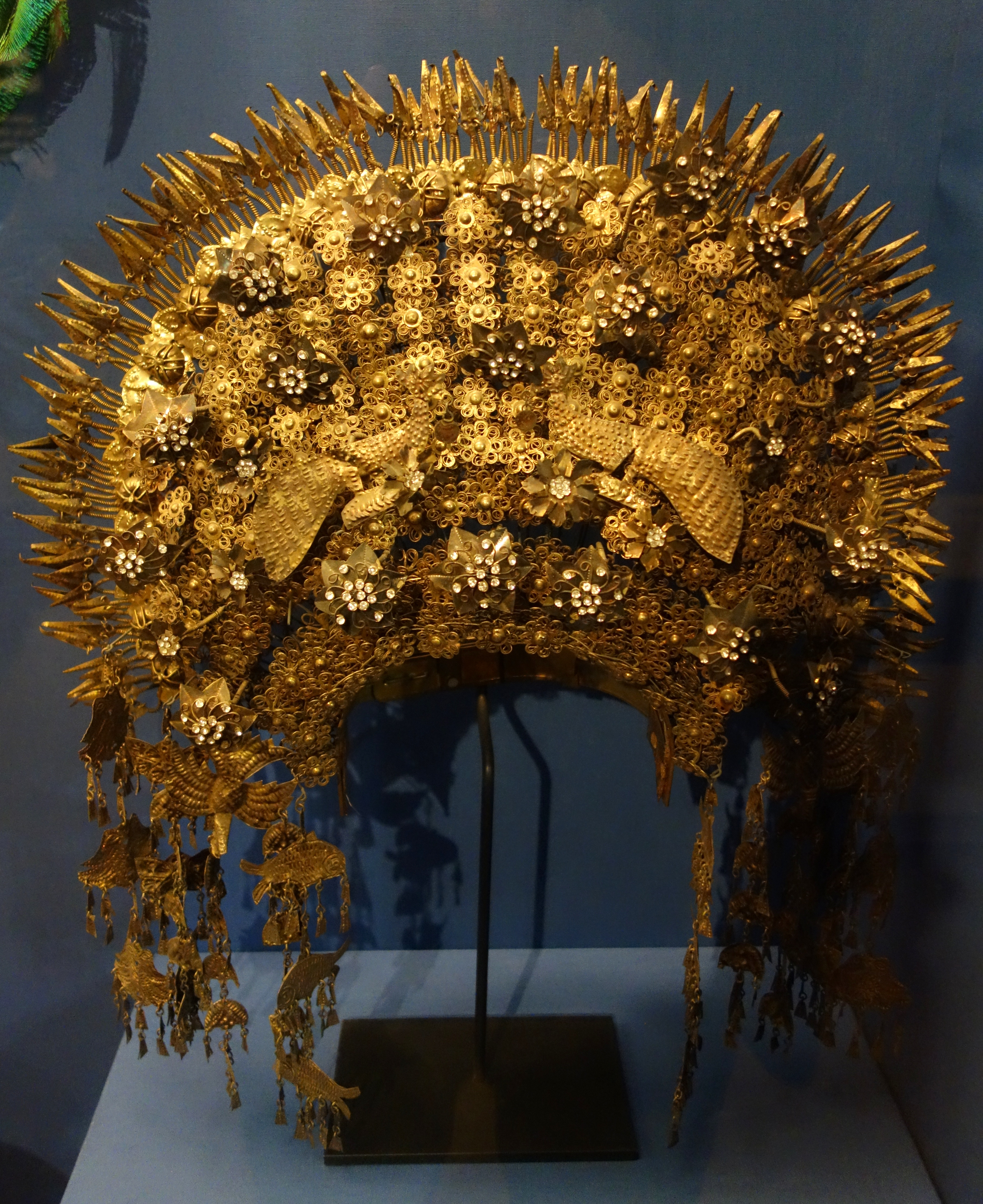
A Suntiang crown, mid-20th century (Fernbank Museum of Natural History)

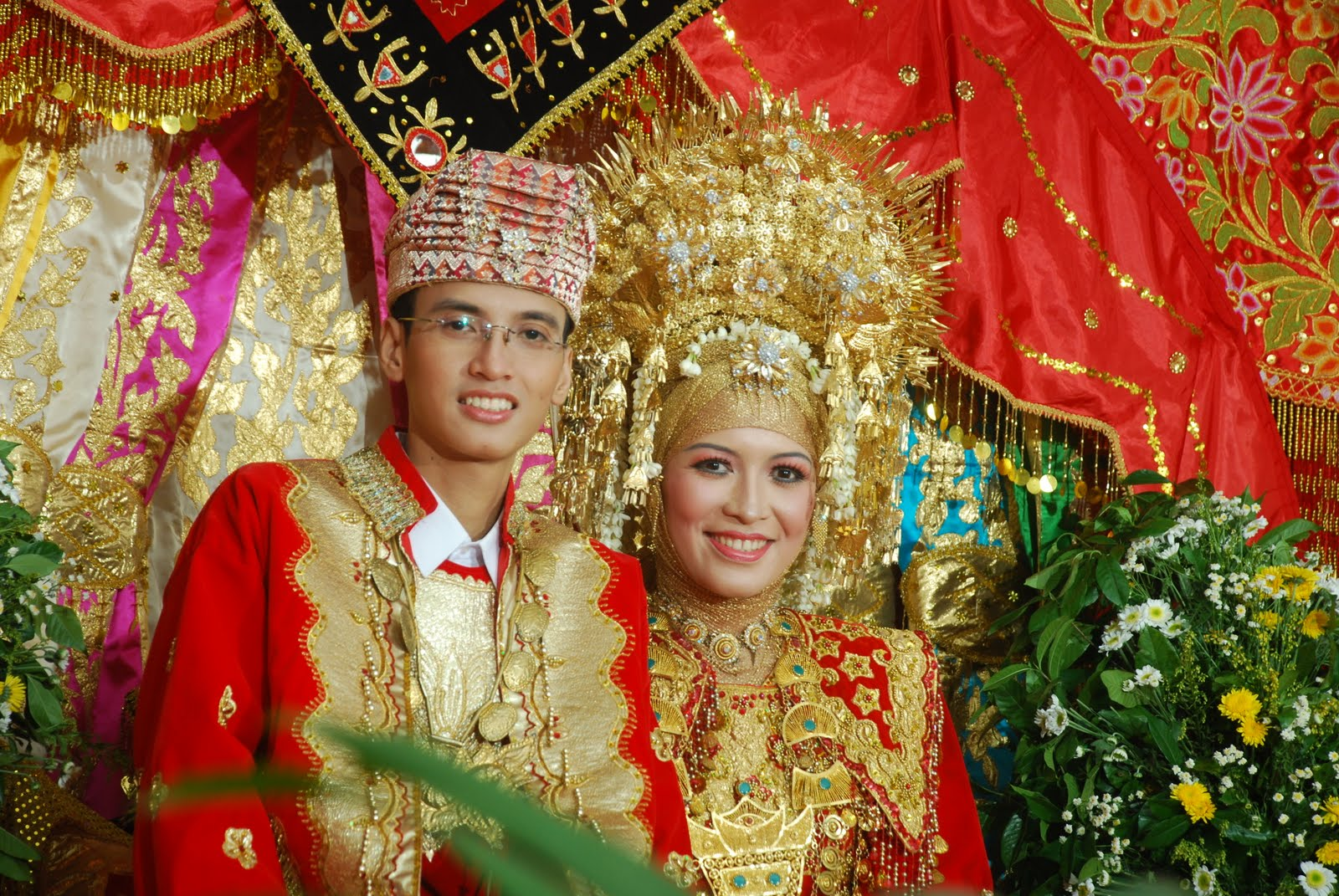
A Minangkabau bride and groom. The bride is wearing a Suntiang Gadang crown.

A Suntiang is an elaborate crown worn normally by Minangkabau women in Sumatra for festive occasions. It has the shape of a radiant fan and is made out of golden materials such as brass and copper.

A piece worn by a bride (referred to as Anak Daro) for a wedding is called Suntiang Gadang, while the one worn by traditional dancers is called Pasumandan. Suntiang is worn at wedding parties, and is quite heavy, weighing up to 3.5 kilograms.

The headpiece's weight is meant to symbolize the burdens that may arise after marriage, like motherhood and furthering the bride's marriage. In the case of the bride wearing the ornament, the message that is conveyed is that she can carry the weight of a relationship.
