= Ali Akbar Navis =

Indonesian author, poet, and humorist

Ali Akbar Navis (17 November 1924 in Padang Panjang, West Sumatra – 22 March 2003 in Padang) was a prominent Indonesian author, poet, and humorist.

Navis showed signs of creativity from a young age. Before discovering his talents as a writer, he was an accomplished flautist and violist. He was also a skilled painter. After graduating from the Indonesisch Nederlandsche School (INS) – a Dutch-language teachers' school in Kayu Tanam in 1945, he began work as head of production at a Japanese-owned porcelain factory.

His skill as a writer led to his appointment on the Central Sumatra Cultural Committee from 1953 to 1955, and his good English-language skills meant he was often asked to assist foreign scholars studying Minangkabau culture.

Navis rose to prominence with the story Surau Kami in 1955, which was voted one of the three best stories of the year by the literary magazine, Kisah. The story was considered very brave in criticizing the pious who neglect the poor. His collection of short stories was released under the same title in 1956 and has been translated into English, German and Japanese.

Navis taught many other writers while producing his own short stories, novels, poetry, children's stories, radio plays and essays on cultural and social problems. He wrote 22 books, plus five anthologies with other poets, and eight anthologies abroad. He also composed 106 papers for academic publishers and activities at home and abroad. They were later collected in the book A Walk Along the Way.

Between 1971 and 1982 Navis served as a member of his home province's house of representatives. He also served as President of the INS Kayu Tanam, an educational foundation.

Navis wrote into his old age, producing Soulmates, published by Grasindo, Jakarta in cooperation Foundation Adikarya IKAPI and The Ford Foundation, at 75 years of age.

Navis made writing a habit in his life, a practice he advocated to others. "Writing is a tool," he told Kompas in 1997.

The most important thing for a man of letters, he says, is his work is durable or not? One of his most famous short novels "Robohnya Surau Kami" detailed stories about cultural bankruptcy in Minangkabau. Navis famously spoke out about the “corruptors” ruining Indonesia.

He was also concerned about the quality of national education, especially what he saw as the failure to read and write with open minds. Navis died after a long illness.

He was survived by one wife, Aksari Yasin, whom he married in 1957, and seven children: Early Akbari, Lusi Bebasari, Dedi Andika, Lenggogini, Gemala Ranti, Rinto Amanda, and Rika Anggraini, and 13 grandchildren. Navis was interred in the Garden of the General Cemetery (TPU) stumps Black, Padang.

== List of books and novels ==
1. Antologi Lengkap Cerpen A.A. Navis (2005)
2. Gerhana, novel (2004)
3. Bertanya Kerbau Pada Pedati (2002)
4. Cerita Rakyat dari Sumatra Barat 3 (2001)
5. Kabut Negeri si Dali (2001)
6. Dermaga Lima Sekoci (2000)
7. Jodoh (1999)
8. Yang Berjalan Sepanjang Jalan (1999)
9. Cerita Rakyat dari Sumatra Barat 2 (1998)
10. Filsafat dan Strategi Pendidikan M. Sjafei: Ruang Pendidik INS Kayutanam (1996)
11. Otobiografi A.A. Navis: Satiris dan Suara Kritis dari Daerah (1994)
12. Surat dan Kenangan Haji (1994)
13. Cerita Rakyat dari Sumatra Barat (1994)
14. Hujan Panas dan Kabut Musim (1990)
15. Pasang Surut Pengusaha Pejuang, Hasjim Ning autobiography (1986)
16. Alam Terkembang Jadi Guru, minangkabau culture (1984)
17. Di Lintasan Mendung (1983)
18. Dialektika Minangkabau (editor) (1983)
19. Dermaga dengan Empat Sekoci, poets (1975)
20. Saraswati: Si Gadis dalam Sunyi, novel (1970)
21. Kemarau (1967)
22. Bianglala (1963)
23. Hudjan Panas (1963)
24. Robohnya Surau Kami (1955)

== Literary awards ==
1. Kincir Mas prize from Radio Netherlands for Jodoh, 1975
2. Femina magazine prize for literature for Kawin in 1979
3. Ministry of Education and Culture National Art Award 1988
4. Ministry of Education and Culture National Literary Award 1992
5. Thai-government awarded South East Asian Writer Award, 1992
