= Amirsham Abdul Aziz =

Malaysian politician

Yang Berbahagia Tan Sri Datuk Amirsham Abdul Aziz PSM PJN
- أميرشام بن عبدالعزيز

Minister in the Prime Minister's Department (Economic Planning Unit)
- In office 18 March 2008 – 9 April 2009
- Preceded by: Mustapa Mohamed
- Succeeded by: Idris Jala

Personal details
- Born: 18 September 1950 (age 75) Johor Bahru, Johor, Federation of Malaya
- Spouse: Faizah Mohd Tahir
- Parents: Abdul Aziz Udin (father); Marsinah Djamil (mother)
- Education: University of Malaya (BEc)
- Occupation: Businessman, politician

Tan Sri Amirsham bin Abdul Aziz (Jawi: أميرشام بن عبدالعزيز) is the former president and chief executive officer of Maybank. His parents A. Aziz Podo and Marsinah Djamil, migrated from Silungkang, West Sumatra. He was the Minister in the Prime Minister's Department in charge of the Economic Planning Unit. Prime Minister Datuk Seri Abdullah Ahmad Badawi's move in appointing him as a minister was seen as an attempt in including specialists in the fields of economics and law to help stimulate the Malaysian economy.

Amirsham's credentials have been exemplary since starting his career in Maybank in 1977. In 1994, he became the Maybank's managing director – taking over from Tan Sri Ahmad Don, who became Bank Negara's governor. Amirsham subsequently became president and CEO in 2002.

On 18 March 2008, he was sworn in as senator at Dewan Negara, his first foray into politics.

== Honours ==
- Malaysia
  - Commander of the Order of Meritorious Service (PJN) – Datuk (1998)
  - Commander of the Order of Loyalty to the Crown of Malaysia (PSM) – Tan Sri (2008)
