= Mohamed Taib bin Haji Abdul Samad =

Mohamed Taib bin Haji Abdul Samad (1858–1925), also known as Haji Mohamed Taib, was a significant merchant in the early history of Kuala Lumpur, Malaysia. Haji Taib was born in Batusangkar, West Sumatra and moved to Kuala Lumpur at 18 years old. He owned tin mines, plantation land and large numbers of houses and shops mostly in Malay Street (Jalan Melayu), Kuala Lumpur. He was a close acquaintance of Sultan Abdul Samad. In the late 19th century, Haji Taib was one of the wealthiest merchants and development centre of city, Kampung Baru. He had 10 children, six sons and four daughters. His brother, Haji Abbas bin Haji Abdul Samad, also regarded as prominent merchants in Kuala Lumpur and surrounding area. Today, there is a street named after him in the heart of Kuala Lumpur, known as 'Lorong Haji Taib'.

== Honour ==
=== Place named after him ===
- Lorong Haji Taib, Chow Kit, Kuala Lumpur
