= Islam in West Sumatra =

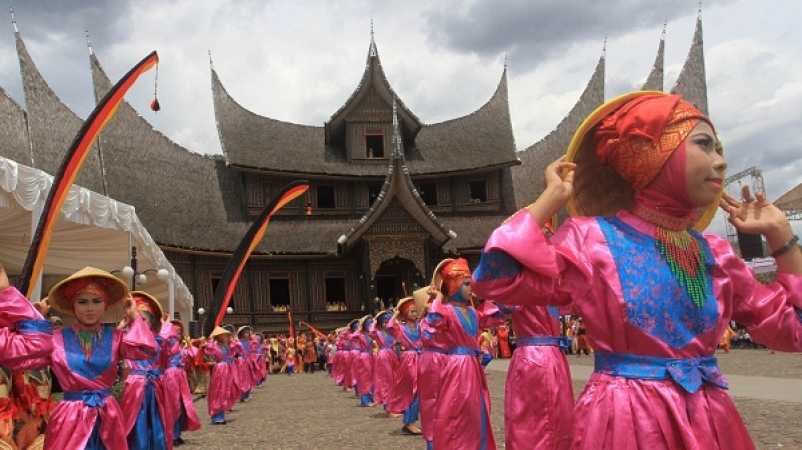
Minangkabau adat festival

Islam is the most common religion in the Indonesian province of West Sumatra, embraced by 97.42% of the population. The Muslim population increases to 99.6% if it excludes the Mentawai Islands, where the majority of the non-Muslim (Protestant) West Sumatrans reside. Islam in West Sumatra is predominantly Sunni, though there is a small Shia Islamic pocket within the coastal city of Pariaman. The Minangkabau people, indigenous to West Sumatra, comprise 88% of the West Sumatran population today and have historically played an important role within Indonesia's Muslim community. Up until today, the region is considered one of the strongholds of Islam in Indonesia.

== History ==
=== Introduction of Islam ===
The introduction of Islam in the West Sumatran region, especially the Minangkabau Highlands, the home of the Minangkabau people, is assumed to have taken two routes: one from eastern Minangkabau between the 7th and 8th centuries, and another from the west coast of Minangkabau after the 16th century. The first route was cultivated by the Muslim Arab traders who came down from the Strait of Malacca through the Kampar River, flowing from the highlands into the strait. This trading activity is estimated as the first contact between the indigenous people and Islam.

The cultural contact became more intensive in the 13th century with the rise of the Muslim Samudera Pasai Sultanate in the northern Sumatra, assuming control of the strait and advancing into east Minangkabau for gold mines and pepper production centers. After the Strait of Malacca fell into Portuguese hands during the 16th century, Islam began entering the west coast of Minangkabau through coastal cities such as Pariaman.

The most substantial Muslim empire in the region was Aceh Sultanate, based in the current Aceh province. Intensive interactions between the Aceh Sultanate and Minangkabau region had developed into significant influence by the former on the latter in terms of Islamic teachings. Among the first Islamic proselytizers in the Minangkabau area was Sheikh Burhanuddin Ulakan, a disciple of Sheikh Abdur Rauf Singkil, who adhered to the Acehnese line of Shattari tariqa. Shattari tariqa quickly spread into Minangkabau through the traditional religious educational institution known as surau.

Islam began to be established in many port towns along the coasts of West Sumatra around the 16th century. The earliest to adopt the religion were the ruling elites and local merchants, although proselytization among the rest of society eventually occurred during the 18th century. Once Islam spread into the interior, the locals accommodated the religion with the ancient customs and culture of the Minangkabau.

=== Spread of Islam ===
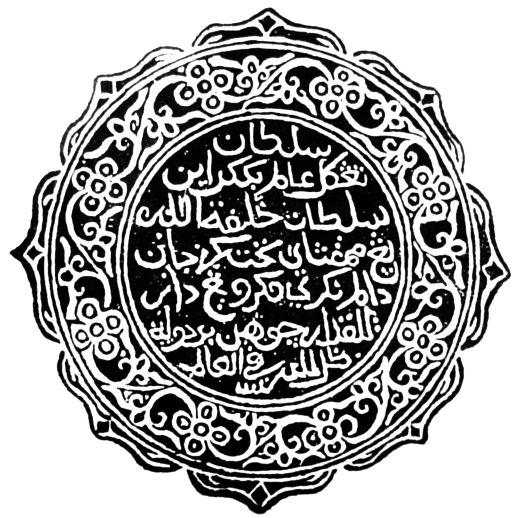
Royal seal of Pagaruyung Kingdom based in West Sumatra

Islam was propagated by several Sufi orders, namely Shattari and Naqshbandi tariqas, through surau and proselytization in the 17th to 19th centuries. There were specific differences in the way religion had developed between the western coastal area and the eastern inland area during the process. The more syncretic form of Islam was spread within the inland area through Naqshbandi tariqa. This Sufi sect was disseminated by Ismail al-Khalidi al-Minangkabawi, and gained a strong foothold there, combined with the commercial advantage coming from its geographic proximity to the Strait of Malacca.

The development of Islam in West Sumatra can also be characterized by tasawwuf (the science of Islamic mysticism) through the emphasis on sharia, which was instituted by the influential Minangkabau ulamas, pioneered by Tuanku Nan Tuo. Tuanku Nan Tuo was a Sufi-oriented reformer who took a wasatiyyah (moderate) position; his syncretic approach between the orthodoxy and non-orthodoxy had successfully laid the foundation of sharia within the Minangkabau Sufi traditions. This led to the comprehensive development of Islamic sciences and studies, often accompanied by applying Islamic solutions to social issues and otherworldly affairs, not confining it to the spiritual aspects.

This development had attempted to transform various aspects of Minangkabau society, especially within the inland agrarian area. The transformation was often colored by conflicts in the religious interpretations stemming from the cultural roots of the Minangkabau people, such as the matriarchal system. The conflict, for example, between the mainstream sharia and Naqshbandi practices, as well as later Islamic modernism between the Sufi orders, had resulted in the intense intellectual development of the religious interpretations and indirectly contributed to the ascendance of the Minangkabau region as one of the most important centers in the history of Islam in Indonesia.

=== Pre-modern era ===
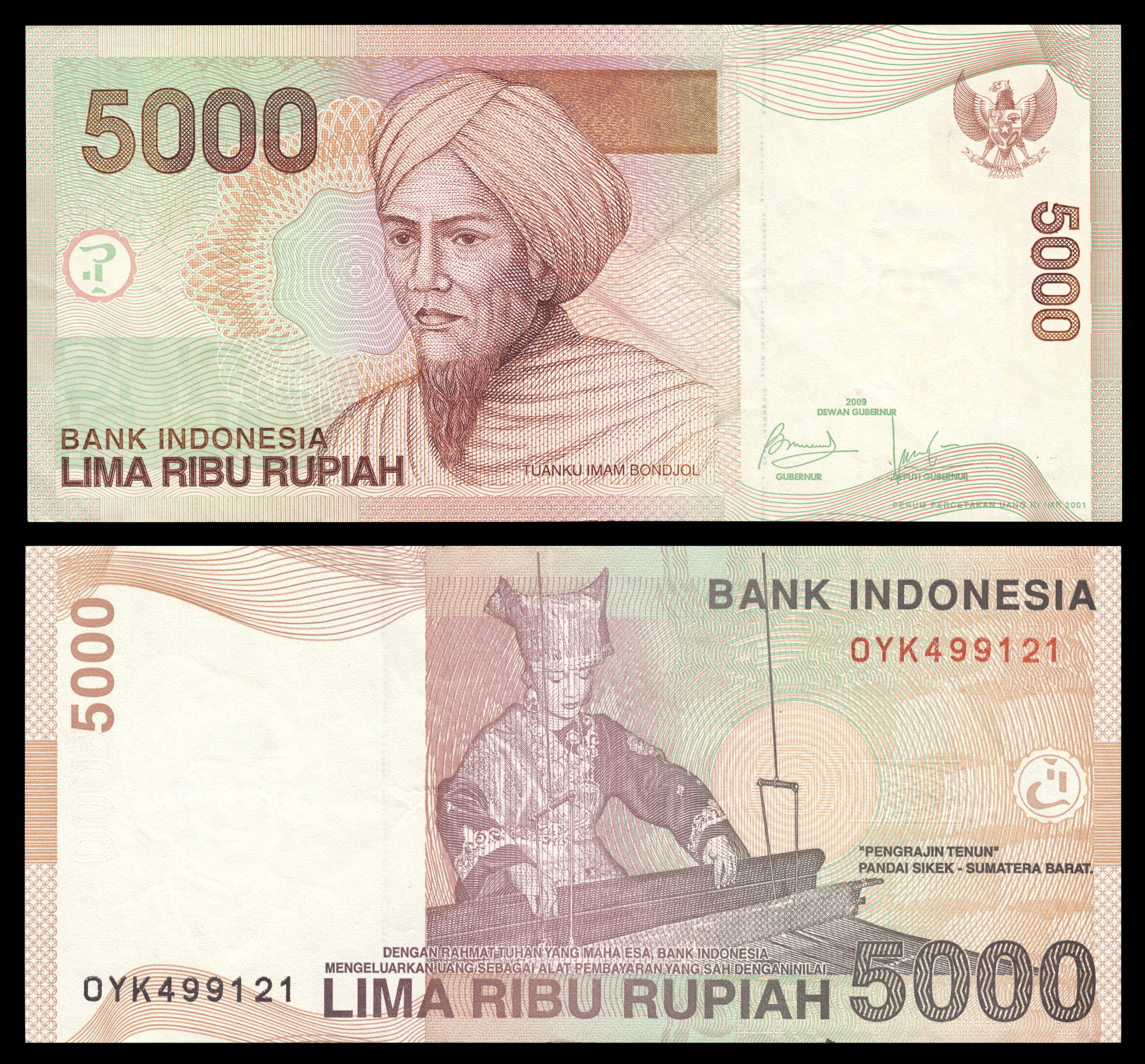
Tuanku Imam Bonjol featured in the 5,000-rupiah banknote issued by Bank Indonesia

After the spread of Islam in the 17th to 19th centuries, Islam was embraced by most of the Minangkabau people who lived both inside and outside of West Sumatra.

In the early 19th century, Minangkabau society began to be influenced by the Islamic intellectual development in the Middle East. Certain Minangkabau ulamas who were inspired by the newly-founded Wahhabism in Mecca intensified their scrutiny against the Pagaruyung kings who were deemed not fulfilling the sharia prescriptions and performing acts considered forbidden or heretical. These reformist scholars became known as padri, who mainly were disciples of Tuanku Nan Tuo. Prominent padris include Tuanku Nan Renceh, Tuanku Imam Bonjol, Tuanku Tambusai and Tuanku Rao.

The rupture of negotiations between the Minangkabau kings and the padris in 1803 erupted into the Padri War. The war was fought between the followers of padri and the adherents of the local custom (adat). After 20 years of fighting, the adat group requested Dutch support in 1833. This led to the intensification of the conflict and the increase in the loss of human lives and cultural properties, erosion of the kingdom's power, and the infiltration by the Dutch taking advantage of the conflict.

Facing the situation, the leader of the padri group, Tuanku Imam Bonjol, began to embrace the indigenous cultures and agreed between the two parties to unite against Dutch colonialism. The two parties had made a consensus on the amalgamation between the Islamic teachings and the local customs, under the principle of Adat basandi syarak, syarak basandi Kitabullah ("Adat based on the teachings of Islam, the teachings of Islam based on the Qur'an").

=== Modern era ===
In the late 19th century, a Minangkabau ulama Ahmad Khatib al-Minangkabawi rose to prominence through rigorous education in Mecca. He became the first foreign scholar to occupy the position of the mufti of Shafi'i school in the city. Many ulamas, scholars, and intellectuals throughout the archipelago who studied in Mecca became the disciple of al-Minangkabawi, including Ahmad Dahlan, the founder of Muhammadiyah, and Hasyim Asy'ari, the founder of Nahdlatul Ulama. Rosters of Minangkabau ulamas who returned to West Sumatra after their education under al-Minangkabawi had formed a new generation of intellectuals, including Muhammad Jamil Jambek, who turned from a tariqa-oriented scholar into the avid critic of Sufism, and Tahir bin Jalaluddin, known for his publication Al-Imam and its influence on Abdullah Ahmad's Al-Munir magazine. These ulamas were based in surau in each Nagari, which turned into a counterweight against the Dutch colonization and the Western education brought by the colonial government.

Minangkabau ulamas of this generation are marked by the intellectual struggle between the traditionalists, who uphold the syncretic Islam fostered mainly through the Naqshbandi worldview, and the modernists, who are inspired by the newly founded Islamic modernist movement, which advocates for Sunnah, modern education, and forsaking of non-orthodox traditions. Among the main contentions of the struggle are the allowance and the scope of ijtihad (independent thinking) and the aspects of hukum wasilah (rules of tawassul) deemed incompatible with Sunnah.

Modernists held West Sumatra as one of their bases for exerting influence throughout the archipelago. One of the first modernist mass organizations in the archipelago was Sumatera Thawalib, established in Padang in 1915. The West Sumatran chapter of Muhammadiyah was established by Abdul Karim Amrullah in 1925. The modernist political party Union of Indonesian Muslims (PERMI) was established in 1930, with Rasuna Said among its leaders. Correspondingly, the traditionalists led by Sulaiman ar-Rasuli established the Union of Islamic Education (PERTI) in 1928.

After the independence of Indonesia in 1945, the state saw the rise of Java-based mass organizations and the intellectuals from Jakarta, Ciputat, and Jogjakarta. Under this circumstance, the prominence of West Sumatra and Minangkabau people in the intellectual landscape of Islam in Indonesia had fallen off since the New Order year. Among the important Minangkabau figures of the post-independence era is Abdul Malik Karim Amrullah (Hamka), who authored Tafsir al-Azhar in 1967, the first tafsir written in Indonesian and taking the vernacular Minangkabau and Malay approaches in interpreting the Qur'an, and Mohammad Natsir, who led the Masyumi Party and Indonesian Islamic Dawah Council, contributing greatly to the propagation of Islamic orthodoxy in Indonesia.

== Society ==
=== Religious outlook ===
Islam occupies the core part of identity among the Minangkabau people. Minangkabau people are considered among the most pious Muslims in the observance of the rituals within the Five Pillars of Islam. As exemplified by their saying Adat basandi syarak, syarak basandi Kitabullah ("Adat based on the teachings of Islam, the teachings of Islam based on the Qur'an"), Minangkabau culture is considered to be linked directly to Islamic religious precepts, in which the authority of the former is upheld by the latter. As such, leaving Islam (murtad) is considered tantamount to leaving Minangkabau society physically and mentally.

=== Education ===
Surau is the traditional Islamic educational institution that originated around the West and South Sumatra regions; the assembly buildings exist for religious, cultural, and festive purposes, similar to Arab Zawiya. The tradition of surau preceded formal Islamic education, which employs orthodox theory and method brought from abroad, and it is considered to have a pre-Islamic root, which can be traced back to a Buddhist monastery founded near Bukit Gombak in 1356 by Adityawarman.

=== Architecture ===
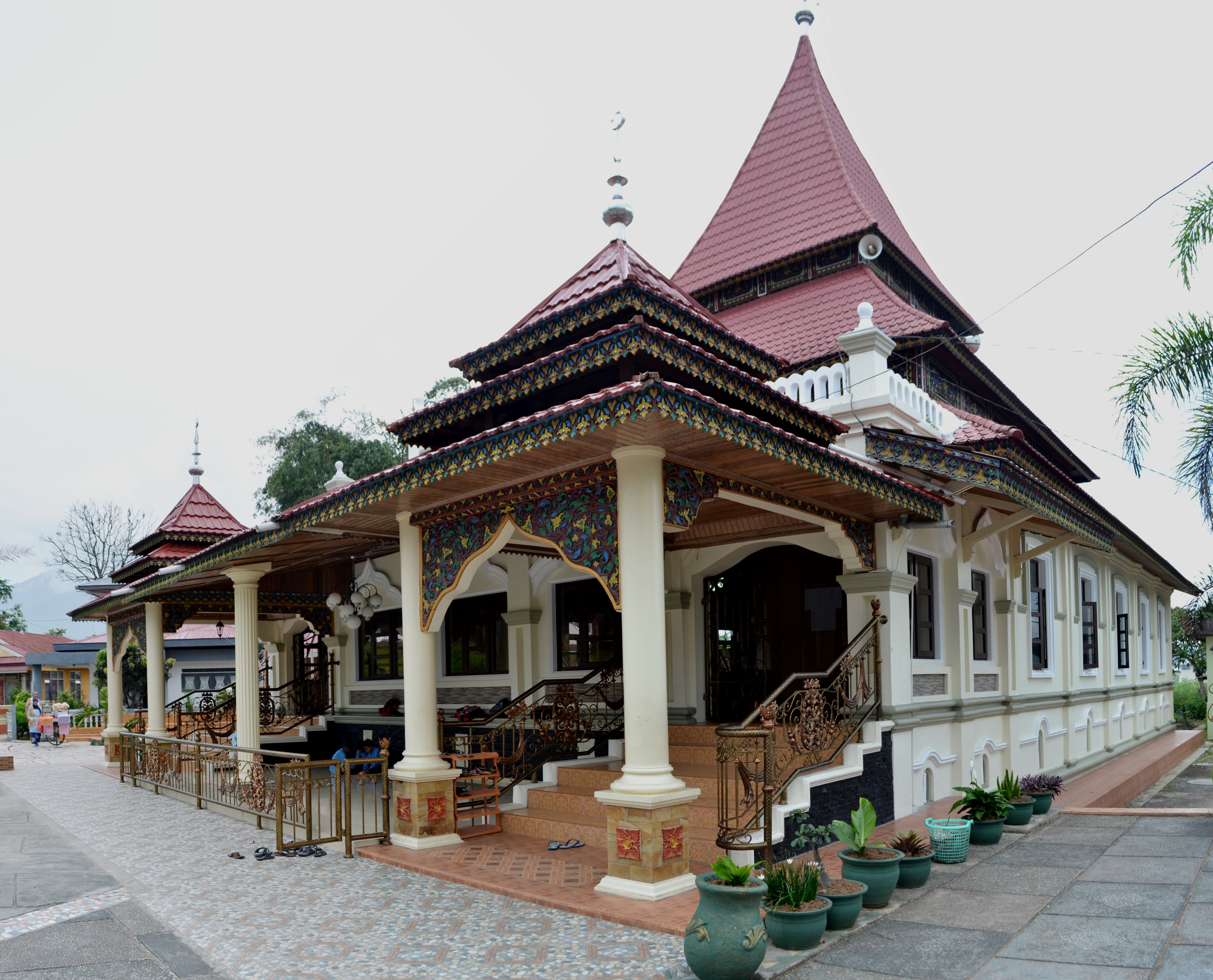
Jami Mosque of Taluak in Agam Regency, featuring vernacular Minangkabau architectural style.

Vernacular-style mosques in West Sumatra are distinguished by their multi-layer roofs made of fiber resembling Rumah Gadang, the Minangkabau residential building. Prominent examples of mosques with vernacular Minangkabau designs are Bingkudu Mosque, founded in 1823 by the Padris, and Jami Mosque of Taluak, built in 1860. Another important religious institution, surau is also often constructed in vernacular Minangkabau style, with three- or five-tiered roofs and woodcarvings engraved in the facade.

=== Festivals ===
Tabuik is a Shia Islamic occasion in the city of Pariaman, and it is a part of the Shia days of remembrance among the Shia local minority. Tabuik also refers to the towering funeral biers carried during the commemoration. The event has been performed every year since the Day of Ashura in 1831 when the practice was introduced to the region by the Shia sepoy troops from India who were stationed—and later settled—there during the British Raj. The festival enacts the Battle of Karbala and includes the playing of tassa and dhol drums.

== See also ==
- Spread of Islam in Indonesia
- Minangkabau culture

== Bibliography ==
- M.D. Mansoer et al. (1970). Sejarah Minangkabau. Jakarta, Bhratara.
- Dobbin, Christine. (1992). Kebangkitan Islam dalam ekonomi petani yang sedang berubah: Sumatra Tengah, 1784-1847. Inis.
- Jones, Gavin W. et al. (2009). Muslim-Non-Muslim Marriage: Political and Cultural Contestations in Southeast Asia. Institute of Southeast Asian Studies.
- Hamka, (1967) Ayahku, Riwayat Hidup Dr H. Abd. Karim Abdullah dan Perjuangan Kaum Agama di Sumatera. Jakarta.
- Dobbin, Christine (1983). Islamic Revivalism in a Changing Peasant Economy: Central Sumatra, 1784–1847. Curzon Press. ISBN 0-7007-0155-9.
- Ma'mur, Ilzamudin (1995). Abul Ala Mawdudi and Mohammad Natsir's Views on Statehood: A Comparative Study Montreal: McGill University. Retrieved 28 October 2011.
