= Al-Munir =

Islamic magazine (1911–1915)

Al-Munir`s cover

Al-Munir was an Islamic magazine, written in Arabic-Malay, published in Padang from 1911 until 1915. Inaugurated by the initiative of Abdullah Ahmad in early April 1911, Al-Munir was listed as the first Islamic mass media in Indonesia. The magazine was often associated with Al-Imam magazine published under the direction of Sheikh Tahir Jalaluddin in Singapore during 1906-1909. In addition to Abdullah Ahmad, several religious figures such as Abdul Karim Amrullah, Muhammad Thaib Umar and Sutan Muhammad Salim were recorded in the ranks of the editorial board.

Carrying the mission as a medium for Kaum Muda (young people) movement, the magazine played an important role in the second wave of Islamic reform in West Sumatra in the early 20th century. The magazine features some of the rubrics that include articles covering Islamic religious matters, question and answer forums that are generally concerned with Islamic jurisprudence, the development of Islamic intellectual activity in the world, and chronicles usually translated from Islamic magazines in the Middle East. However, due to budget constraints, the magazine stopped its publishing in 1915. Even so, the birth of Al-Munir was soon followed by a similar publication by various Islamic movements throughout the archipelago.

== History ==
In 1906, Al-Imam magazine began its publishing in Singapore under the direction of Sheikh Tahir Jalaluddin. This magazine had historically been in close connection with Al-Urwatul Wusqa, a magazine published by the prominent Islamic reformists Jamal-al-Din Afghani and Muhammad Abduh in Paris, France. The magazine was widespread in the Malay Peninsula and the island of Sumatra. One of the regions that experienced the strongest influence of the publication was Minangkabau region in West Sumatra.

After the publication of Al-Imam stalled in 1909, Abdullah Ahmad, the Minangkabau delegation of Al-Imam, immediately met the leader of the magazine in Singapore. In his visit, Ahmad conveyed his intention to publish a magazine with the same vision and mission of da'wah. Returning from a visit to Singapore, with the support of local merchants, Ahmad began initiating the publication of Al-Munir in Padang.

The association of the founders of Al-Munir joined in Sjarikat Ilmu, a council consisted of ulamas, which also became the publishing and managing body of Al-Munir. Its members consist of scholars from the Islamic reform group in Minangkabau or often called Kaum Muda (young people). Although Ahmad was the director, he was not a daily committee, which was served by Marah Muhammad. In the ranks of the editorial board, headed by Sutan Djamaluddin Abubakar, there were a number of prominent Islamic figures including Abdul Karim Amrullah (father of Hamka), Muhammad Thaib Umar, and Sutan Muhammad Salim (father of Agus Salim). Other writers not included in the governing structure include Ibrahim Musa Parabek, Abbas Abdullah, Zainuddin Labay El Yunusy, and Muhammad Jamil Jambek.

== Issue ==
Al-Munir declared its intent when it was first published in early April 1911. According to Masoed Abidin in Encyclopedia of Minangkabau, the name Al Munir means torch, which in turns connotes the light of enlightenment. The magazine was published every Saturday, at the beginning and the middle of the month in the Islamic calendar. Most editions were 16 pages long, and the inscription used Jawi alphabet, as in the early 20th century some Minang people were still proficient in writing and reading the Arabic-Malay script. However, the spelling used in the magazine followed the spelling standards used in the colonial government schools.

To distribute the magazines and collect subscriptions, Al-Munir had 31 agents in various areas spread across Sumatra, Java, and the Malay Peninsula. The factor caused the widespread distribution of this magazine is considered its utilization of a network of Al-Imam magazine already spread throughout the archipelago. Later the magazine expanded its follower base into Sulawesi and Kalimantan.

In terms of its content, Al-Munir had some similarities with Al-Imam. Many of the issues already contained in Al-Imam were re-enacted in Al-Munir. The contents of Al-Munir magazine can be broadly grouped into sections; editorials, mailings, questions and answers, and domestic/foreign news. In addition, there was also a translation section from the Middle Eastern magazines such as Al-Manar and Al-Ahram. The written articles and the answers to the letters of the reader were mostly concerned with the issues of Islamic jurisprudence and aqeedah (Islamic creed). In addition to advocacy on the compatibility of Islam and modern science and rationality, Al-Munir actively called on Muslims to return to pure Islamic teachings by abolishing taqlid (conformity to legal precedence) and opposing the practice of ecumenical bidah (religious innovation), khurafat (superstition) and tariqa (Sufi order).

Through Al-Munir, the scholars of Kaum Muda expressed their ijtihad (independent reasoning) to some of the problems previously forbidden by the traditional scholars, such as the legality of taking photographs, or illegality of wearing ties and hats.

== Termination ==
Al-Munir ceased its publication on January 31, 1915. In the essay included in the final edition, it was stated that "Al-Munir cannot be continued, but to the readers and the Islamic community it is advisable to continue to increase their knowledge with diligent reading." The termination of the magazine was due to lack of funds. In the later editions, the magazine had repeatedly published announcements to agents and readers to send their subscriptions. In addition, the scholars who managed the magazine had absolutely no background in business. Publishing at the time was held only for the purpose of da'wah, without being accompanied by business skills and professionalism.

Three years after the end of Al-Munir, on the proposal of Abdul Karim Amrullah, the mass organization based in West Sumatra Sumatra Thawalib had published a magazine under the name Al-Munir Al-Manar in Padang Panjang in 1918. The magazine was led by the Muslim scholar Zainuddin Labay El Yunusi, who was among the contributors to Al-Munir. However, the magazine only lasted for six years. The publication of Al-Munir Al-Manar stalled after the death of Zainuddin Labay El Yunusi in 1924. However, Al-Munir Al-Manar is often referred as the continuation of Al-Munir magazine. Similar to Al-Munir, the magazine was published twice a month, at the beginning and middle of the month.

== Reception ==
Although the circulation of Al-Munir had reached no more than 2,000 copies, the magazine was widely read in a number of areas in Sumatra, Malay Peninsula, and Java. In Minangkabau itself, the magazine raised both pro and counter-reactions.

After the presence of Al-Munir, soon magazines with the same spirit had appeared in Minangkabau area, such as Al-Akbar based in Adabiyah School. The network of Sumatra Thawalib in various regions published limited issue magazines, such as Al-Bayan in Parabek, Al-Basyir in Sungayang, Al-Ittiqan in Maninjau, and Al-Imam in Padang Japang. Similarly, the conservative clerics, later dubbed as Kaum Tua (old people), published counter magazines, such as Suluh Malayu under the leadership of Khatib Ali, and Al-Mizan under the leadership of Abdul Majid and Hasan Basri.

In 1916, Abdullah Ahmad worked with the Chairman of the Islamic Sarekat Tjokroaminoto to establish Al-Islam magazine in Surabaya. The magazine marked the beginning of the acceptance of Islam Nusantara with the use of Latin script.

== See also ==
- List of theology journals

== Bibliography ==
- Abuddin Nata (2005). Tokoh-tokoh Pembaruan Pendidikan Islam di Indonesia. Raja Grafindo Persada. ISBN 979-3654-58-9.
- Ahmat Adam (1995). The Vernacular Press and the Emergence of Modern Indonesian Consciousness (1855-1913). ISBN 978-0-87727-716-3.
- Burhanuddin Daya (1990). Gerakan Pembaharuan Pemikiran Islam. Jakarta: Tiara Wacana.
- Cristian Dobin (1987). Islamic Revivalism in a Changing Peasant Economy. London: Curzon Press.
- Deliar Noer (1982). Gerakan Moderen Islam di Indonesia 1900–1942. Jakarta: LP3ES.
- Dewan Redaksi (2002). Ensiklopedia Islam, Jilid 4. Departemen Agama Indonesia. Jakarta: Ichtiar Baru van Hoeve. ISBN 979-8276-65-5.
- Gusti Asnan (2003). Kamus Sejarah Minangkabau. Pusat Pengkajian Islam dan Minangkabau. ISBN 979-97407-0-3.
- Hamka (1962). Ayahku. Jakarta: Uminda.
- Harun Nasution (1992). Ensiklopedi Islam Indonesia. Jakarta: Penerbit Djambatan. ISBN 979-428-134-4.
- Hendra Naldi (2008). “Booming” Surat Kabar di Sumatra's Westkust. Yogyakarta: Ombak.
- Luthfi Assyaukanie (2009). Islam and the Secular State in Indonesia. Institute of Southeast Asian Studies. ISBN 981-230-889-X.
- Mafri Amir (2000). Historiografi Pers Islam Indonesia. Jakarta: Quantum.
- Mahmud Yunus (1996). Sejarah Pendidikan Islam di Indonesia. Jakarta: Hidakarya Agung.
- Marthias Dusky Pandoe (2001). A Nan Takana. Yayasan Obor Indonesia. ISBN 978-979-709-002-9.
- Masoed Abidin (2005). Ensiklopedi Minangkabau. Pusat Pengkajian Islam dan Minangkabau. ISBN 979-3797-23-1.
- Merle Calvin Ricklefs (2001). A History of Modern Indonesia Since C. 1200. Stanford University Press.
- Mochtar Effendy (2001). Ensiklopedi Agama dan Filsafat. Vol. 3. ISBN 979-587-151-X.
- M. Sanusi Latief (1989). Gerakan Kaum Tua di Minangkabau. Jakarta: IAIN Syarif Hidayatullah.
- Rusydi Hamka (1986). Etos Iman, Ilmu, dan Amal dalam Gerakan Islam. Pustaka Panjimas.
- Syamsuri Ali (1997). Al-Munir dan Wacana Pembaharuan Pemikiran Islam 1911–1915. Padang: IAIN Imam Bonjol.
- Yudi Latif (2005). Inteligensia Muslim dan Kuasa. Mizan Pustaka. ISBN 979-433-400-6.
- Yusuf Abdullah Puar (1989). Perjuangan dan Pengabdian Muhammadiyah. Pustaka Antara. ISBN 979-801-300-X.
