= Ganting Grand Mosque =

Mosque in Padang, West Sumatra, Indonesia

Coordinates: 0.95455°S 100.36942°E

- Masjid Raya Ganting مسجد رايا جانتينغ
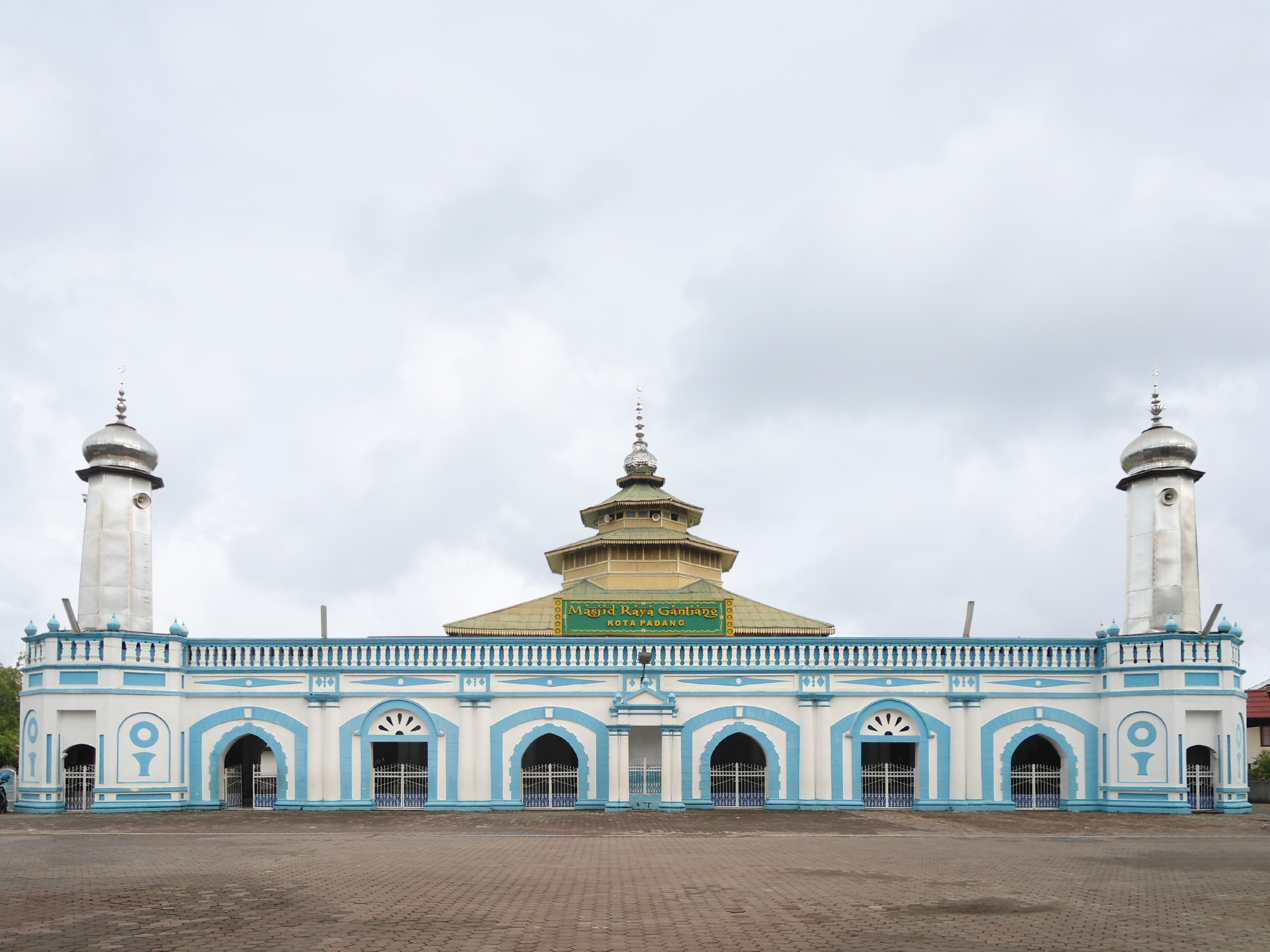

Religion
- Affiliation: Islam
- Branch/tradition: Sunni
- Leadership: Waqf

Location
- Location: 10 Ganting Street, Ganting, Padang Timur, Padang, Indonesia
- Interactive map of Ganting Grand Mosque

Architecture
- Style: European neoclassic
- Groundbreaking: 1805
- Completed: 1810

Specifications
- Direction of façade: Southeast
- Length: 42 metres (138 ft)
- Width: 39 metres (128 ft)
- Minaret: 2

Website
- www.masjidrayagantiang.com

The Ganting Grand Mosque (Indonesian: Masjid Raya Ganting; also written and pronounced Gantiang in Minang) is a Sunni mosque located in Ganting, Padang, West Sumatra, Indonesia. Construction began in 1805, making it the oldest in Padang and one of the oldest in Indonesia. It is a Cultural Property of Indonesia.

The building, which involved people from various cultural backgrounds in its construction, was the centre of an Islamic reform in the area during the 19th century. Future president Sukarno spent a time of exile at the mosque in 1942. It survived the tsunami which struck Padang following the 1833 Sumatra earthquake, but was severely damaged after earthquakes in 2005 and 2009.

The one-floor establishment continues to be used as a center for prayer, as well as religious education; it also functions as a pesantren for the community. The mosque is also a tourist attraction.

== Early history ==
According to Abdul Baqir Zein, the mosque was first built in 1700 at the foot of Mount Padang, then moved to the bank of Batang Arau, as the Dutch colonial government intended to use the previous location to build a road to Emma Haven Port. It was later moved to its present location. However, the Indonesian Department of Religion documents the mosque as having been constructed in 1790 with a wooden frame and a roof made from Sago palms. According to this documentation, a sturdier mosque was built in 1805. Another history of the mosque, from the Culture and Tourism Department of the City of Padang, suggests that the mosque was first constructed in 1805. The small mosque had stone flooring, wood and dirt walls, and a pyramidal ceiling like the mosques in Java.

The construction of the mosque was spearheaded by three local figures, Angku Gapuak (a rich merchant), Angku Syekh Haji Uma (the village chief), and Angku Syekh Kapalo Koto (an ulama), while the funds were provided by Minang businesspeople and ulamas throughout Sumatra. It was erected on waqf land donated by locals and located in the center of the city's Minang district. Construction of the mosque finished in 1810; it measured 30 by 30 metres (98 ft × 98 ft) and had a fence 4 metres (13 ft) out from the mosque.

Since its establishment, the mosque has been used to counsel future hajj participants. It also served as the first point of departure for hajj participants from Central Sumatra, who left Sumatra via Emma Haven after the port was opened in 1895. Before the end of the Padri War, in 1818 the Minang Ulamas held a meeting at Ganting to discuss the steps they would take to eliminate mysticism and superstition from Islam on the island.

In 1833 a large earthquake on the west coast of Sumatra struck up a tsunami which destroyed much of Padang. The mosque was one of several buildings which survived the tsunami. Its stone floor was later replaced by a mixture of clam shells and pumice.

== Modern history ==
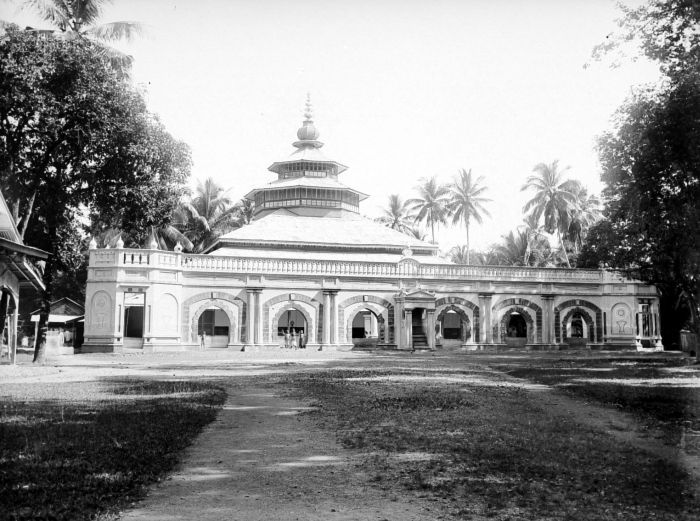
Ganting Grand Mosque before the installation of its minarets, c. 1900–1923

The floor had received work beginning in 1900, when tiles from the Netherlands, ordered through Jacobson van den Berg. The tiles were installed by a company-appointed worker; installation was completed in 1910. That year, the Dutch established a cement factory in Indarung, Padang. To transport the cement to the port at Emma Haven, the Dutch built a stone road in front of Ganting Grand Mosque; this road took up roughly a third of the waqf land the mosque had been built on. As compensation, the Dutch sent the Genie Command Corps of West Sumatra (an area that includes modern day West Sumatra and Tapanuli). The corps expanded the front chamber until it was 20 metres (66 ft) in length; they also built a Portuguese style façade. The mosque's floor was replaced with cement imported from Germany. Meanwhile, ethnic Chinese under Captain Lo Chian Ko began working on an octagonal dome, resembling the top of a vihara. The mihrab for the imam to lead prayers and preach was given Chinese-style carvings. In 1921 Abdul Karim Amrullah established the Thawalib Schools in Padang mosques, including Ganting, to better educate the local populace in Islam. The alumni later established the Persatuan Muslim Indonesia (Permi), under the Masyumi Party. The mosque was the location of the first national jamboree of Muhammadiyah's scouting organisation, Hizbul Wathan, in 1932.

When the Japanese began occupying the Indies in 1942, Sukarno – at the time a Dutch prisoner in Bengkulu – was evacuated to Kutacane. However, once they reached Painan they discovered that the Japanese forces had already occupied Bukittinggi; this quashed hopes of bringing Sukarno to Barus in Tapanuli. The Dutch left Sukarno in Painan. Hizbul Wathan members, at the time based out of Ganting, went to retrieve Sukarno and bring him to Padang by cart. For several days after arriving in Padang, Sukarno slept at the mosque; he also delivered a speech. During the three-year Japanese occupation the mosque served as the military's headquarters in central and western Sumatra. It also functioned as a training camp for Gyugun and Heiho soldiers, military units formed by the Japanese which consisted of native soldiers; the Gyugun was formed by the ulamas, while the Heihos were taken from the santri.

After the Allies landed in Sumatra, many of the Muslim Indian soldiers brought by the English deserted and joined the native revolutionaries. They planned strategy in the mosque, including the assault on a British barracks. One of these Indian soldiers, who had died in the assault, was buried at the mosque. Since 1950, after Indonesia's independence was recognised, the Ganting Grand Mosque has hosted numerous statesmen from both Indonesia and abroad, including Vice President Mohammad Hatta, Minister of Defence Sultan Hamengkubuwana IX, and General Abdul Haris Nasution. Foreign dignitaries who have visited the mosque included people from Malaysia, Saudi Arabia, and Egypt.

Construction on the mosque has continued. In 1960 the mosque's 25 columns, originally constructed from brick, were covered in ceramic tiles; seven years later, this was followed seven years later by the construction of minarets on the left and right of the dome. In 1995, the walls of the main chamber were covered in tile.

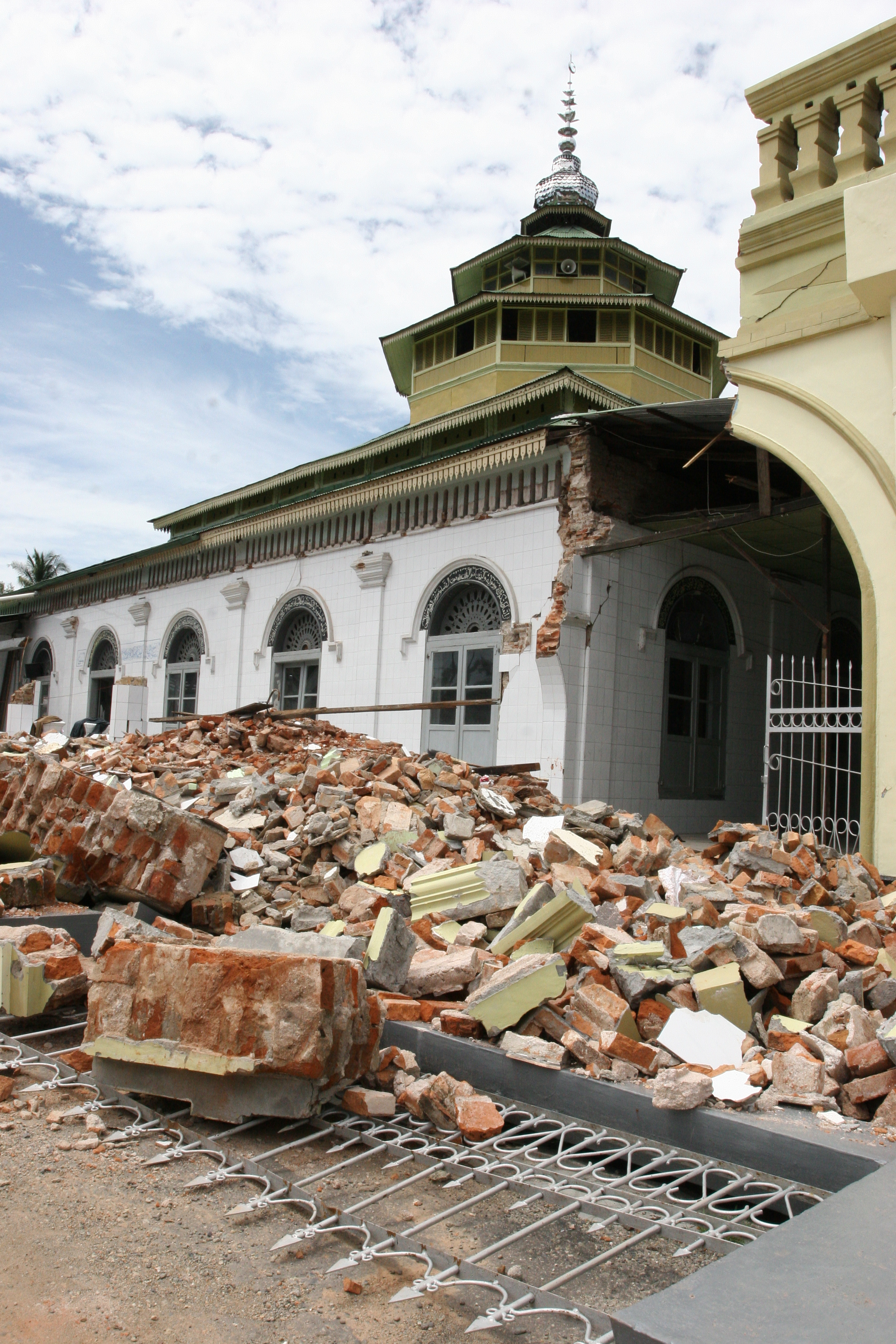
Some of the destruction caused to the mosque after the 2009 Sumatra earthquakes

On 10 April 2005 an aftershock measuring 6.7 on the Richter scale struck the west coast of Sumatra two weeks after a larger earthquake struck Nias. This caused cracks to the columns supporting the mosque's roof. Three years later, the Ganting Grand Mosque was one of 608 places of worship severely damaged when another large earthquake struck the area on 30 September 2009. The earthquake collapsed part of the mosque's façade and caused severe structural damage to the interior columns; as a result, the community feared that the mosque would collapse. Before renovations were completed in 2010, prayers had to be held in the yard. In 2011 the Ganting Grand Mosque was listed as one of Indonesia's 100 most beautiful mosques in a book compiled by Andalan Media. The only other mosque from West Sumatra included was Raya Bayur Mosque, Agam Regency.

== Architecture ==
Ganting Grand Mosque is built on land measuring 102 by 95.6 metres (335 ft × 314 ft); the mosque itself is 42 by 39 metres (138 ft × 128 ft). The building has verandas on its front and sites, a mihrab, and a central area. The extra land can hold more people during the Eid prayers, on both Eid ul-Fitr and Eid al-Adha. The courtyard is surrounded by an iron fence, separating it from the busy streets on the eastern and northern sides of the mosque. On the southern side, as well as behind the mosque proper, there are numerous graves, including that of Angku Syekh Haji Uma, one of the mosque's founders.

The architectural blend of numerous schools shows clearly because of the different cultural groups involved in the mosque's construction, including the architecture of Europe, the Middle East, China, and the Minangkabau. The mosque's roof goes upwards in five steps, with the dome at the top; the first step is square, while the rest are octagonal. Each part of the roof has slits in it for lighting.

=== Veranda ===
The mosque proper has two main verandas, at the façade and its side. Both verandas measure 30 by 4.5 metres (98 ft × 15 ft) and have two doorways, one of which leads to the rooms for wudu located on the northern and southern sides of the mosque. On the western side of the mosque is a room (ribat) for its keeper, measuring 4.5 by 3 metres (14.8 ft × 9.8 ft). The ribat has a 225-by-90-centimetre (89 in × 35 in) door facing east and a window measuring 90 by 90 centimetres (35 in × 35 in).

The forward veranda measures 12 by 39 metres (39 ft × 128 ft) and has six doorways to the east and two each to the north and south; in each doorway hangs an iron grate door. Each of the east facing doorways is decorated with a pair of non-supporting columns. In the center of the veranda is the 220 by 120 by 275 centimetres (87 in × 47 in × 108 in) minbar, which juts out to the front and has an iron grate door. The minbar is only used during Eid prayers. Aside from the doors, the veranda has two windows with iron trellises, one each to the north and south.

On the eastern wall of the front veranda hangs a geometric carving created with square and rectangular panels. There are also arc designs which merge into ring and axehead shapes. The walls measure 34 centimetres (13 in) thick and 320 centimetres (130 in) high. Inside the veranda there are seven double iron-wrought cylindrical columns with a diameter of 45 centimetres (18 in). These columns rest on concrete pedestals measuring 113 by 70 by 67 centimetres (44 in × 28 in × 26 in). There are also two square columns on the northern and southern sides, near a central, octagonal room which has one doorway from the east and one window.

=== Main chamber ===
The main chamber is a 30-by-30-metre (98 ft × 98 ft) square, with eight entrances on the east and due each on the north and south. The doors measure 160 by 264 centimetres (63 in × 104 in) and have wooden doors with spread fan carvings on the threshold above. There are two windows with wooden frames on the eastern wall, flanking the doors, as well as three windows on both the north and south walls and eight on the west. These windows measure 1.6 by 2 metres (5 ft 3 in × 6 ft 7 in). As with the doors, the threshold above the windows is decorated with spread fan carvings. The walls are made of concrete covered in ceramic, while the floor is made of white tiles with a flower motif.

This main room includes 25 saka guru, or main columns. They are hexagonal in shape and with diameters ranging from 40 to 50 centimetres (16 to 20 in). These columns are made of red brick and bound with egg whites, lacking any iron framework. The 25 columns are arranged in 5 rows, representing the 25 prophets in Islam. Each column is covered in marble engraved with the names of the prophets, from Adam to Muhammad. These columns are the main supports for the octagonal roof above.

On the western side of the room is a mihrab flanked by two smaller rooms on its north and south. The mihrab measures 2 by 1.5 metres (6 ft 7 in × 4 ft 11 in). It is 320 centimetres (130 in) tall on the east side and 210 centimetres (83 in) tall on the west side.

=== Other areas ===
The Ganting Grand Mosque Masjid has wudu chambers measuring 10 by 3 metres (32.8 ft × 9.8 ft) on the north and south sides of the side verandas. These enclosed chambers were built as permanent structures in 1967. The mosque's library is in a structure on the northern side of the mosque, which is connected to the mosque proper. There are also three smaller structures on the grounds for the consultation of future hajj pilgrims. One of the structures was once part of the a Thawalib school.

== See also ==
- Islam in Indonesia

== Bibliography ==
- "608 Unit Tempat Ibadah Rusak Berat Dihoyak Gempa" [608 Places of Worship Severely Damaged After Earthquake]. Antara (in Indonesian). 6 October 2009.
- Akbar, R. (4 September 2008). "Masjid Raya Ganting Bertonggak 25 Nabi" [Ganting Grand Mosque Standing with 25 Prophets]. Okezone.com (in Indonesian). Archived from the original on 3 November 2013.
- Ariefyanto, M.I. (15 March 2012). "Masjid Raya Ganting, Simbol Agung di Kota Modern" [Ganting Grand Mosque, Symbol of Greatness in a Modern City]. Republika (in Indonesian).
- Culture and Tourism Ministry of Padang. "Masjid Raya Gantiang" [Gantiang Grand Mosque] (in Indonesian). Archived from the original on 4 November 2013.
- Evers, H.-D. (1993). "Images of a Sumatran Town: Padang and the Rise of Urban Symbolism in Indonesia". In Nas, P.J.M. (ed.). Urban Symbolism. Studies in Human Society. Vol. 8. Leiden: E.J. Brill.
- Gayo, H.M.I., ed. (2008). "Masjid Bersejarah di Indonesia" [Historical Mosques in Indonesia]. Buku Pintar Seri Senior [Senior Handbook Series] (in Indonesian). Jakarta: Grasindo.
- Hanifah, M. (16 May 2012). "Legenda Unik Jadi Objek Wisata Bumi Minangkabau (II-Habis)" [Unique Legends for Tourist Attractions in the Land of the Minangkabau (II-End)]. Okezone.com (in Indonesian). Archived from the original on 19 May 2012.
- "Mesjid Raya Ganting" [Ganting Grand Mosque] (PDF) (in Indonesian). Ministry of Religion of Indonesia. Archived from the original (PDF) on 14 October 2011.
- "Mandiri Donates Rp 8.5 Billion to Rehabilitate Padang". The Jakarta Post. 22 February 2010.
- Naldi, E. (25 August 2009). "Mengintip Masjid Tua & Bersejarah di Padang" [Peeking in on Old & Historical Mosques in Padang]. Viva News (in Indonesian).
- Patrizki, I. (2 October 2009). "Gempa Sumbar" [West Sumatran Earthquake]. Antara (in Indonesian).
- Peraturan Menteri Kebudayaan dan Pariwisata Nomor PM.54/PW.007/MKP/2010 Tahun 2010 [Decree of the Minister of Culture and Tourism Number PM.54/PW.007/MKP/2010 of the Year 2010], Jakarta: Ministry of Culture and Tourism, 22 June 2010
- Risman, D.; Kusnadi, A. (4 November 2005). "Syiar Islam dari Masjid Raya Ganting" [Islamic Broadcasts from the Ganting Grand Mosque]. Liputan 6.
- "Rp1,3 Miliar untuk Renovasi Masjid Raya Ganting" [Rp1.3 Billion to Renovate the Ganting Grand Mosque]. Antara (in Indonesian). 17 February 2010.
- Sharpe, E. (3 November 2009). "First Reports from Sumatra Earthquake". The Art Newspaper.
- Sharpe, E. (14 April 2010). "Six Months on: Rebuilding West Sumatra's Capital". The Art Newspaper.
- Sidik, J.M. (22 April 2011). "Masjid Ganting Masuk 100 Masjid Terindah" [Ganting Mosque Considered One of the 100 Most Beautiful]. Antara (in Indonesian).
- Sisko, Y. (17 September 2008). "Aneka Budaya di Wajah Masjid Raya Ganting" [Various Cultures on the Face of Ganting Grand Mosque]. Detik.com (in Indonesian).
- Slamet (2008). "Taspen Padang Serahkan Hibah ke Masjid Raya Ganting" [Taspen Padang Gives Grant to Ganting Grand Mosque] (in Indonesian). Taspen.
- Soekarno (1990). Bung Karno dan Islam: Kumpulan Pidato Tentang Islam, 1953–1966 [Sukarno and Islam: Collection of Speeches on Islam, 1953–1966]. Jakarta: Haji Masagung. ISBN 979-412-167-3.
- Suriyanto (25 December 2010). "Padang Aims to Lure 2.5 Mln Tourists Next Year". Antara.
- Susanto, A. (9 October 2009). "Masjid Rusak Akibat Gempa" [Mosque Damaged Because of Earthquake]. Kompas (in Indonesian). Archived from the original on 3 November 2013.
- Zein, A.B. (1999). Masjid-masjid Bersejarah di Indonesia. Jakarta: Gema Insani. ISBN 979-561-567-X.
