= Sumatera Thawalib =

Former Islamic organization based in Dutch East Indies

Sumatera Thawalib was one of the earliest Islamic mass organizations in Indonesia, based in West Sumatra. Sumatera Thawalib represented the modernist school of Islam in Indonesia, an Islamic reform with heavy emphasis on the Qur'an, hadith, a modern scientific education, and abolishing of non-orthodoxy. Islamic Modernism was promoted by Muhammad Abduh. The term Sumatera Thawalib literally means "Students of Sumatra", and it was founded on January 15, 1919 as a result of meeting between the Muslim students of Padang Panjang, Parabek and Padang Japang. The aim of the organization was deepening of Islamic knowledge among the Muslim students. The organization had contributed substantially to the development of Islam in West Sumatra in the early 20th century.

== History ==
=== Origin ===
Sumatera Thawalib was originated from surau, an Islamic religious assembly ingrained within the Minangkabau society and tradition. This traditional educational institution was still surviving in the face of the newly-founded madrasahs which aimed for renewal in Islamic education. Among the first suraus which implemented the more modern educational system such as utilization of desk, chair and blackboard was Surau Jembatan Besi in Padang Panjang. Surau Jembatan Besi was founded in 1914 by Abdullah Ahmad and Abdul Karim Amrullah, also known as Haji Rasul. After Ahmad moved to Padang, Haji Rasul inaugurated him as the successor of the leadership of the surau and brought many reforms. In 1915, a coop called Koperasi Pelajar was instituted by Haji Habib, and later it was expanded by Haji Hasyim. With the establishment of the coop, Surau Jembatan Besi was considered having open atmosphere and willing to accept innovative methods, as the concept of coop was brought from the West.

In 1913, Zainuddin Labai Al-Yunusi returned to Padang Panjang after studying with Sheikh Abbas Abdullah in Padang Japang, Payakumbuh. Zainuddin became the teacher of Surau Jembatan Besi, and later in 1915 established his own religious school. Inspired by the system of Surau Jembatan Besi, Zainuddin invited several students of the surau and created an association known as Makaraful Ichwan in order to deepen the Islamic knowledge, solve the compatibility between Islam and science, and for the bonding and networking among the Muslim students. In 1918, through the network of Makaraful Ichwan, Zainuddin, Jalaluddin Thaib and Inyiak Mandua Basa renamed Koperasi Pelajar coop into Sumatera Thawalib, and expanded the scope of activity. This renaming was accompanied by the transformation of the surau itself, into Surau Sumetera Thawalib. This reformation was also caught an attention of the youth organization Jong Sumatranen Bond, which recently established their branches in Bukittinggi and Padang.

As Surau Jembatan Besi went through several reforms, in 1918 when Haji Rasul established Surau Sumatera Thawalib, many changes implemented in its predecessor was succeeded on the surau as well. Among the educational system adopted by Surau Sumatera Thawalib were the class system, reconstruction of curriculum and teaching methods, and textbooks teaching more general subjects. Shortly after, Surau Parabek which was founded by Sheikh Ibrahim Musa, also moved toward the reformation in the field of education, Surau Gadang Syeikh Abbas Abdullah become Sumatera Thawalib Padang Japang and this was followed by many other suraus as well.

=== Establishment ===
Surau Parabek was originally named Surau Muzakartul Ikhwan (or Jamiatul Ikhwan), and it was founded by Sheikh Ibrahim Musa on September 20, 1910. On January 15, 1919, at the surau belonged to Muhammad Jamil Jambek in Bukittingi, students of the Sumetera Thawalib and Parabek held a meeting. As a result, Sumetera Thawalib was established as the educational organization that connects the two suraus, with the aim of intensification of Islamic education in West Sumatra. The inauguration was attended by Abdullah Ahmad, Haji Rasul, Muhammad Thaib Ummar and Ibrahim Musa. In 1921, Ibrahim Musa introduced the madrasah system into Surau Parabek emulating the one in Sumatera Thawalib. Subsequently, the surau had renamed itself into Sumatera Thawalib Parabek. This renaming had inspired several other suraus in Padang Japang, Maninjau and Batusangkar area into integration into Sumatera Thawalib system and applying similar educational system onto their respective suraus.

=== Political development and shutdown ===
Soon after the establishment, the organization had developed politically with the integration of all the suraus in West Sumatra, and they encouraged all the students in the suraus to form organizations that connect them all together. On January 22, 1922, at the invitation of the students of Sumatera Thawalib Padang Panjang, a meeting was held between the representatives of all schools of Sumatera Thawalib. The meeting decided to form a unity of Thawalib student organizations under a single Central Council with branches in the regions. The union is called the Student Union of Sumatera Thawalib and its center of activity was in Padang Panjang. In 1923, with the influence of Djamaluddin Tamin and Datuk Batuah, communism was brought to the union and attracted the hearts of the disciples of Sumatera Thawalib. This new idea was thoroughly opposed by the lecturers of the organization, especially Haji Rasul who was then a professor. These political developments had led to the shutdown of the organization by the Dutch East Indies colonial government in 1928.

== Legacy ==
In 1928, the traditionalist ulamas led by the former lecturers of Sumatera Thawalib founded the Union of Islamic Education (Persatuan Tarbiyah Islamiyah, PERTI) to accommodate the Islamic education in West Sumatra. In the same year, former students of Sumatera Thawalib agreed on establishing the Islamic-nationalist organization the Union of Indonesian Muslims (Persatuan Muslim Indonesia, PERMI) which eventually developed into a political party. Notable politicians of the party include Rasuna Said.

Beside establishing union, some of Sumatera Thawalib school transformed into independent political free well known Islamic education institution nowadays. Sumatera Thawalib Ibrahim Musa Parabek transformed become Thawalib Parabek, Sumatera Thawalib Syekikh Abbas Abdullah Padang Japang transformed into Darul Funun.

== See also ==
- Islam in West Sumatra

== Bibliography ==
- Menchik, Jeremy. (2017) Islam and Democracy in Indonesia: Tolerance without Liberalism. Cambridge Studies in Social Theory, Religion and Politics.
- Naim, Mochtar. (1990) Madrasah Sumatera Thawalib Parabek, Bukittingi. Laporan Penelitian Madrasah Bersama Tim Penelitian IAIN Imam Bonjol, Padang.
