= Rasimah Ismail =

Indonesian politician

Rasimah Ismail (born 1911) was an Indonesian activist and women's rights advocate who fought for independence during the Indonesian National Awakening era. Hailing from Bukittinggi, Minangkabau region, she was a friend of Rasuna Said, a National Hero. Both were once members of the Union of Indonesian Muslims (PERMI), a political party that advocated for Islamic-nationalism and opposed to the colonialism.

Due to her persistent resistance against the Dutch colonial government, Rasimah and Rasuna were arrested and later deported to Semarang on June 9, 1933, aboard the SS van Linskhoten from Emma Haven port (today's Teluk Bayur port) in Padang. At the time, the two were around 22 years old, and they were sent off by thousands of supporters who arrived from all over Minangkabau.

Rasimah was a sister of Abdul Gaffar Ismail, an ulama and fighter against the colonialism. She was also an aunt of Taufiq Ismail, a poet.
