= Rahmah el Yunusiyah =

Indonesian activist and politician (1900–1969)

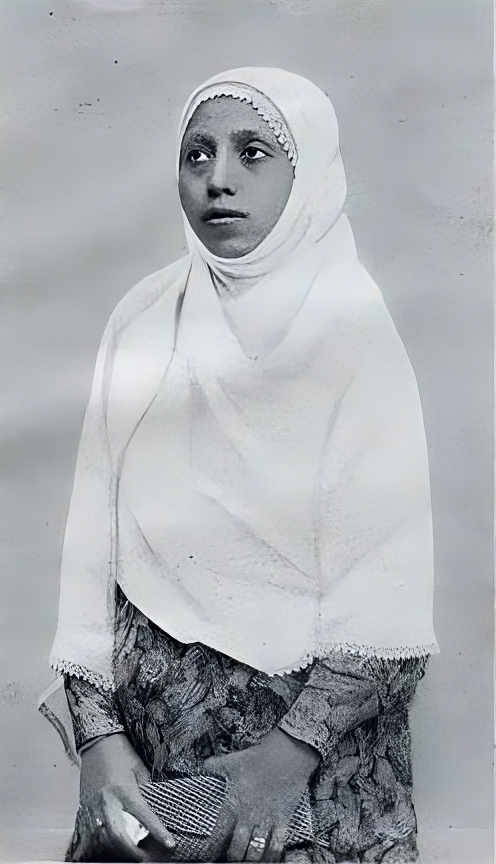
- el Yunusiyah in 1932
- Born: 26 October 1900; Nagari Bukit Surungan, Padang Panjang, Dutch East Indies
- Died: 26 February 1969 (aged 68); Padang Panjang, West Sumatra, Indonesia
- Title: MP of the People's Representative Council
- Term: 1956–1959
- Political party: Masyumi
- Parents: Muhammad Yunis bin Imanuddin; Rafi'ah
- Relatives: Zainuddin Labay el Yunusi (brother); Isnaniah Saleh (cousin)
- Honours: National Hero of Indonesia

Rahmah el Yunusiyah (Van Ophuijsen Spelling: Rachmah el Joenoesijah, 26 October 1900 – 26 February 1969) was a Dutch East Indies and Indonesian politician, educator, and activist for women's education. Born into a prominent family of Islamic scholars, she was made to leave school in order to get married as a teenager. After a few years of marriage, el Yunusiyah obtained a divorce and returned to her education.

In 1923, she founded Diniyah Putri, the first known Islamic school (madrasa) for girls in the Indies. As the school grew and established itself, el Yunusiyah helped found three more schools for women and girls as well as a teacher training institute. An Islamic nationalist, el Yunusiyah was imprisoned by the Dutch authorities before Indonesia's independence. In 1955 she became one of the first women to be elected to the People's Consultative Assembly of independent Indonesia as a member of the Masyumi Party. She died aged 68 in 1969 in her hometown, Padang Panjang.

In 2025, el Yunusiyah was named a National Hero of Indonesia, the country's highest civilian honor.

== Early life ==
El Yunusiyah was born on 26 October 1900 in Bukit Surungan, Padang Panjang, West Sumatra, Dutch East Indies. She was the youngest child of an elite Minangkabau family which belonged to the ulama; her father was a well-known qadi named Muhammad Yunis bin Imanuddin and her mother was named Rafi'ah. Her grandfather, Sheikh Imaduddin, was also a well-known Islamic scholar, astronomer and leader of the local branch of the Naqshbandi order. Although she started to get basic Islamic tutoring from her father, he died when she was only six years old. After that she began to receive an education from some of her father's former students, and learned to read and write. (Note: el Yunusiyah learned Arabic and Latin scripts (most likely the Arabic language as well as the Jawi alphabet and Van Ophuijsen Spelling System for local languages)) She also received some training in midwifery at a local hospital.

=== Marriage ===
Her family arranged for her to be married to a scholar named Bahauddin Lathif in 1916, while she was still a student in Padang Panjang, and she was required to leave school. However, she continued to study Islam in private study circles starting in 1918. In 1922, her husband married two more wives, and el Yunusiyah obtained a divorce before returning to her education; they had not had any children during their marriage.

== Educational activism and leadership ==
El Yunusiyah's family had long been involved in Islamic education in West Sumatra, and in 1915 her brother Zainuddin Labay el Yunusi had founded the Dinayah School; Rahmah became a student there. After returning to study there when her marriage ended in 1922, she led study sessions among the girls outside of class. This study circle was influenced by Ruhana Kuddus' Amai Setia; it was called the Women and Girl's Association. (Note: Dutch: Vrouwenbond dan Meisyeskring, Indonesian: Perkumpulan Wanita dan Kelompok Gadis.)

=== Diniyah Putri ===
El Yunusiyah was unsatisfied with the level of Islamic education for girls in the schools they had access to, as well as the social dynamics that prevented them from fully accessing education in mixed-gender schools. She consulted with local ulema, and with the support of her brother Zainuddin and her study circle, opened a school specifically for girls in November 1923. This school, located in Padang Panjang, was called Diniyah School Putri; (Note: Also known as Madrasah Diniyah Li al-Banat.) it is generally thought to be the first Muslim religious school in the country for young girls.

At first, the school did not have its own building and operated out of a mosque, where she was the main teacher. The initial cohort of students consisted of 71 women, mostly young housewives from the surrounding area; the curriculum consisted of basic Islamic education, Arabic grammar, some modern European schooling, and handicrafts. The existence of a modern school for girls was not fully accepted in the community, and she faced some hostility and criticism. El Yunusiyah, a deeply religious woman, believed that Islam demanded a central role for women and women's education.

In 1924, a permanent classroom for the school was built in a local house. The same year, her brother Zainuddin died; despite fears that the loss of his sponsorship would mean the end of the school, el Yunusiyah continued her efforts. El Yunusiyah also started a supplemental program for older women who had not had proper education, although it was cut short after the 1926 Padang Panjang earthquakes destroyed the Diniyah school building. The classes met in makeshift buildings for several years and Muhammadiyah approached her with an offer to take over the operation of the school and help to reestablish it; she decided not to accept the offer. She toured widely in the Indies to raise money and a new permanent building was built and opened in 1928. The nationalist figure Rasuna Said had been a student in the mixed gender Dinayah school, becoming an assistant teacher in the girls' school in 1923. Said incorporated politics explicitly into her courses, causing a disagreement with el Yunusiyah. Said left the school for Padang in 1930.

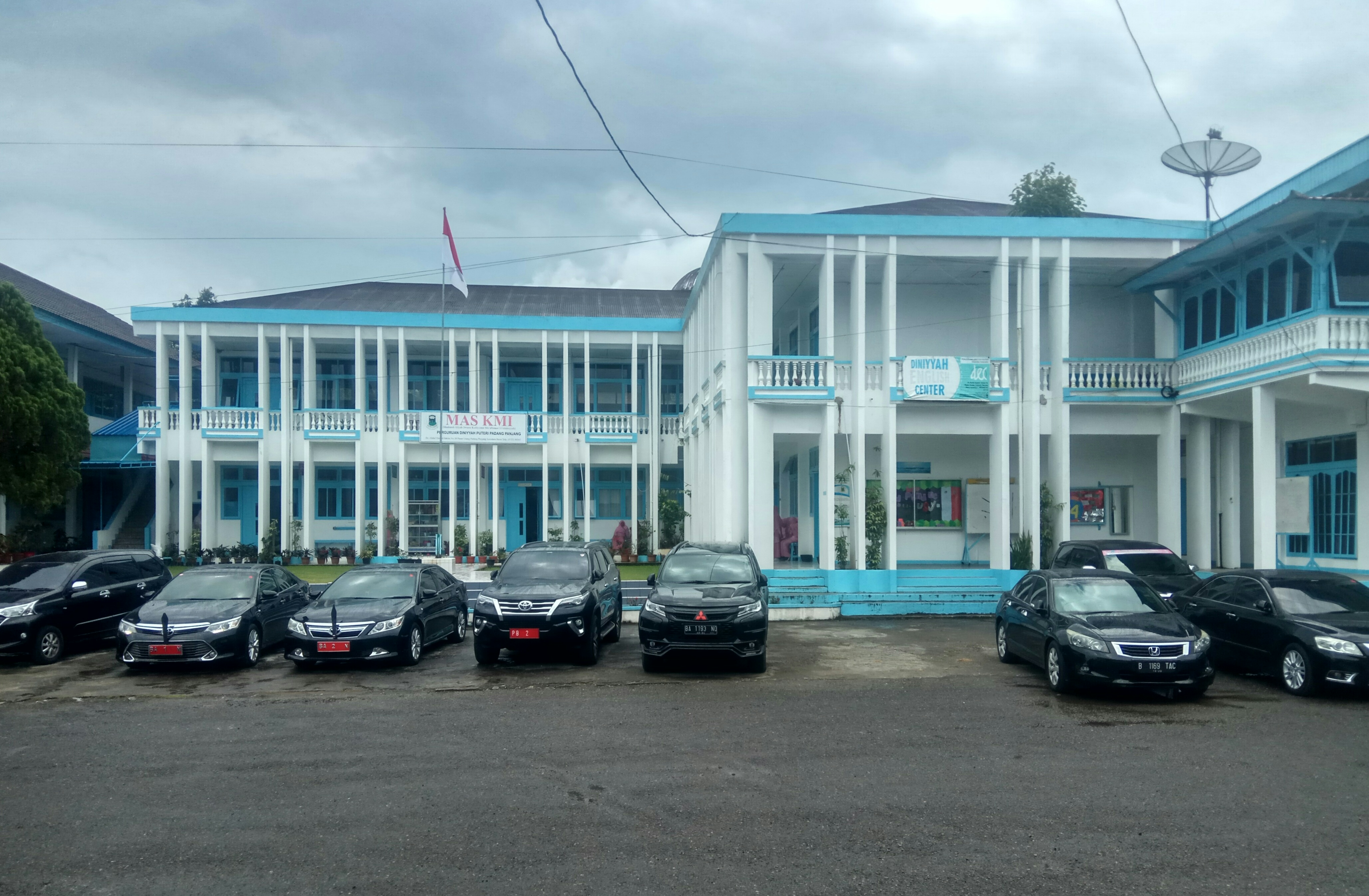
Diniyah Putri school building in 2019

The school continued to gain popularity and by the end of the 1930s had as many as five hundred students. The scholar Audrey Kahin calls Diniyah Putri "one of the most successful and influential of the schools for women" in pre-independence Indonesia.

=== Continued advocacy ===
El Yunusiyah disdained contact with the Dutch; unlike other modernising female figures such as Kartini, she did not have European friends and in turn did not have a high profile among them. She purposefully did not accept government subsidies for her schools, and despite incorporating some elements of European-style schooling, the dress, calendar cycle and curriculum were focused squarely on Islam. Like the Taman Siswa movement of independent schools, she fought hard to avoid being penalised by Dutch regulations against so-called "wild" or illegal schools.

During the 1930s, el Yunusiyah continued to develop the capacity of Islamic women's education in West Sumatra and continued her support for the Indonesian nationalist movement despite its criminalization by the Dutch. In 1933 she established an association of female teachers of Islam, and in 1934 she held a meeting to sign women up for the Indonesian cause. She became involved in the Persatuan Muslim Indonesia, an Indonesian nationalist movement with an Islamic character. During this time she was fined by the Dutch for discussing politics (Note: Specifically, the "wild schools" ordinance.) in illegal meetings. In 1935, el Yunusiyah founded two additional schools in Jakarta, as well as a high school in Padang Panjang in 1938. She also founded a teacher training institute in 1937, the Kulliyatul Muallimat al Islamiyyah (KMI).

== World War II and independence era ==
During the Japanese occupation of West Sumatra, el Yunusiyah collaborated with the Japanese and led a Giyūgun unit in Padang Panjang. However, she opposed the Japanese use of Indonesians as comfort women and campaigned against the practice. During the war, she also made efforts to materially support her former students. In 1945, upon hearing of the proclamation of Indonesian independence, she immediately raised the red-and-white Indonesian flag in the schoolyard at Diniyah Putri. After the end of the war, during the Indonesian Revolution, she set up a supply unit to support the Republican side against the Dutch. She was held prisoner by the Dutch authorities for seven months in 1949, and was released after the Dutch–Indonesian Round Table Conference.

=== Politics ===
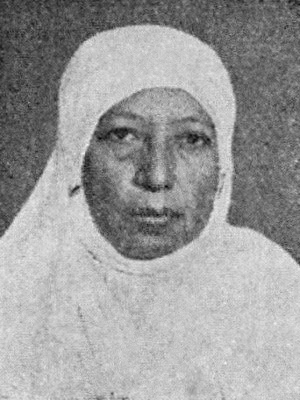
El Yunusiyah in 1956

El Yunusiyah was recruited to participate in the Preparatory Committee for Indonesian Independence. The new Indonesian Republic brought about a complete revolution in education in the country, and she participated in some of the first major conferences about updating the education system in late 1949.

In 1955, el Yunusiyah was elected to the first Indonesian People's Consultative Assembly, one of the first female members of the legislature. She was sworn in in late March 1956. She was elected representing the Islam-oriented Masyumi Party, of which she had been an early supporter in West Sumatra. In late 1956 she also became an advisor to the Banteng Council under Lt. Col. Ahmad Husein. Husein's organization was a local movement against the central government; the council enjoyed broad support in West Sumatra.

In 1958, she came to support the Revolutionary Government of the Republic of Indonesia (PRRI), an anti-government movement largely based in Sumatra. Her support of that movement deepened her schism with her former colleague Rasuna Said, who was now closely allied with Sukarno, the nation's president. Because of her support for the PRRI, el Yunusiyah lost her seat in the Assembly. She was arrested in 1961 but was later freed under an amnesty granted to former PRRI militants by Sukarno.

=== Education ===
In 1950 el Yunusiyah returned to Padang Panjang to supervise the Diniyah Putri school, which was once again in operation after the war. In 1956, Abd al-Rahman Taj, the Grand Imam of Al-Azhar University in Egypt, visited el Yunusiyah's school in Padang Panjang. Taj was impressed, and in 1957, el Yunusiyah was invited to visit Al-Azhar, shortly after she had completed her hajj to Mecca. The faculty of Al-Azhar awarded her the title of Syeikah, which they had never given to a woman before. Subsequently, graduates of Diniyah Putri were granted scholarships to continue their studies at Al-Azhar by the Egyptian authorities. In the 1960s, following her political career, el Yunusiyah returned to her educational activism and pushed for the founding of an Islamic university specifically for women. In 1967, her efforts succeeded, and a women's university was inaugurated by West Sumatra governor Harun Zain.

She died on 26 February 1969, in Padang Panjang. Her grave, located on the grounds of the Diniyah Putri school dormitory, is listed as a cultural heritage site by the Ministry of Culture's Third Regional Cultural Preservation Agency with its seat in Batusangkar, Tanah Datar.

== Recognition ==
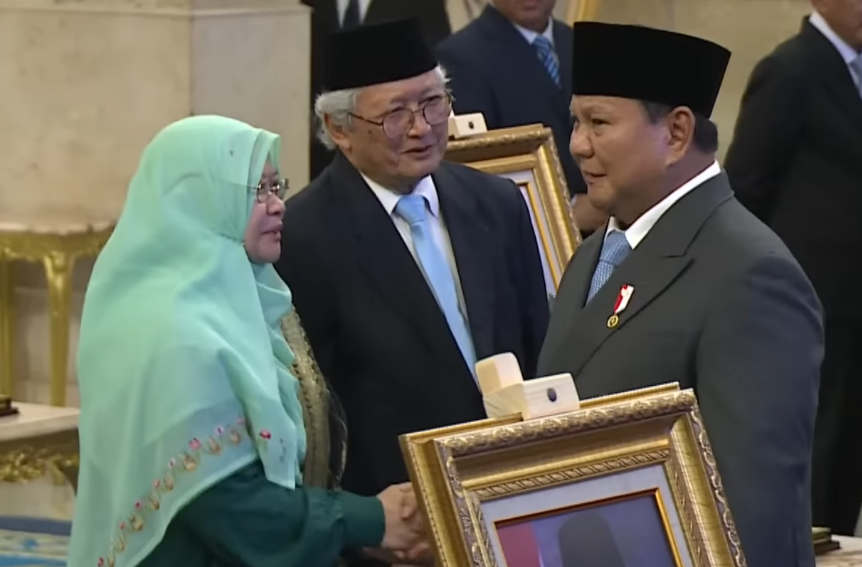
Fauziah Fauzan El Muhammady with Subianto during the conferment of the national hero title to el Yunusiyah.

El Yunusiyah was named a National Hero of Indonesia by President Prabowo Subianto at the State Palace in November 2025. The award was received by Fauziah Fauzan El Muhammady, the head of the Diniyyah Puteri Padang Panjang Institute.
