= Modernism (Islam in Indonesia) =

Religious movement

In the context of Muslim society in Indonesia, Modernism or modernist Islam refers to a religious movement which puts emphasis on teachings purely derived from the Islamic religious scriptures, the Qur'an and Hadith. Modernism is often contrasted with traditionalism, which upholds ulama-based and syncretic vernacular traditions. Modernism is inspired by reformism during the late-19th to early 20th century based in the Middle East, such as the Islamic modernist, Salafiyya and Wahhabi movements. Throughout the history of contemporary Muslim Indonesia, these movements have inspired various religious organizations; from the mass organization Muhammadiyah (1912), political party Masyumi Party (1943), to missionary organization Indonesian Islamic Dawah Council (1967).

== Usage of the term ==
The division between "traditionalism" and "modernism" is widely used by both Indonesians and foreign academics to describe the chasm which has been existed among the contemporary Muslim society in Indonesia. Previously, Muslim society in Java in particular was analyzed through the division of abangan, santri and priyayi popularized by an anthropologist Clifford Geertz based on communal identity. However, this division has already been considered obsolete. Geertz's category of santri is considered referring to modernist Islam. Greg Barton of Monash University states that since the 1950s and 1960s, Indonesian society could be reasonably described based on the traditionalist-modernist dualism.

== Definition ==
Modernism/Reformism in the Indonesian context is defined by its pure adherence toward the Qur'an and Hadith, promotion of ijtihad (individual reasoning), rejection of madh'hab (schools of thought in Islamic jurisprudence) and as well as criticism against taqlid (imitation of judicial precedence) to religious scholars, Sufism, and vernacular traditions based on syncretism with local practices. It is also often discussed in terms of its internal conflict between the tendency inspired by the Enlightenment philosophy, science and rationality, championed by Muhammad Abduh, and the one oriented toward scriptural literalism and unified regulation of formal ritual behavior promoted by Rashid Rida. The latter is considered closer to Salafism. According to Robin Bush of RTI International, modernism initially encouraged ijtihad in order to widen the freedom of individual interpretation, but the rejection of religious sources outside of the scripture has led to the development of a rigid and legalistic tendency.

=== Neo-modernism ===
Since the 1980s and 1990s, attempts to bridge the gap between traditionalism and modernism were made, and progressive intellectuals of both sides have attained interpretational resemblance with common goals of pluralism and interfaith tolerance. These movements are called "neo-modernism" by scholars such as Fachry Ali, Bahtiar Effendy and Greg Barton. Neo-modernism was heavily inspired by the Pakistani Muslim intellectual Fazlur Rahman, and popularized by an intellectual stream called pembaruan (renewal). The most important neo-modernist or pembaruan thinkers including Nurcholish Madjid, Djohan Effendi and Luthfi Assyaukanie. They have cooperated with the reform-minded traditionalists such as Abdurrahman Wahid of Nahdlatul Ulama, holding strong influence during the late 1990s to early 2000s.

== History ==
Islam in Indonesia was spread by Arab traders and Sufi saints after the 16th century. It had legitimated the authority of the ulama and taqlid as a learning system, and prompted incorporation of vernacular Hindu or animist practices into the Islamic tradition. Since the 18th century, the Islamic world was facing European colonization worldwide and philosophical crisis. Islamic modernism was articulated by philosophers such as Jamal ad-din Al Afghani, Muhammad Abduh and Rashid Rida to revive the Islamic civilization. They criticized the ulama's authority and taqlid as blind imitation, as well as Sufism for deviation and blamed them for the demise of Islamic teaching and civilization.

With the increase of Indonesian students studying the Middle East, especially Cairo, Indonesian Muslim such as Abdullah Ahmad, Ahmad Dahlan, Ahmad Hassan, and Moenawar Chalil had brought Islamic modernism into the Indonesian archipelago. In West Sumatra, a reformist youths who called themselves kaum muda ("young generation") held strong influence. Ahmad founded an Islamic magazine Al-Munir in Padang, inspired by Al-Manar published by Rida. In 1912, Dahlan established a socio-religious organization Muhammadiyah, the first religious mass organization in Indonesia. Hassan and Chalil both became prominent members of a modernist organization PERSIS, established in 1923. Other modernist organizations including Al-Irshad Al-Islamiya in Jakarta (1914) and Sumatera Thawalib in West Sumatra (1915).

Modernists were also active on the political arena, establishing Union of Indonesian Muslims (PERMI) in 1930, Masyumi Party in 1943, (Note: While Masyumi Party initially comprised both traditionalists and modernists, traditionalists later increasingly voted for Nahdlatul Ulama party.) and Muslim Students' Association (HMI) in 1947. The leader of the Masyumi Party, Mohammad Natsir, became the most prominent proponent of modernism throughout the Sukarno and New Order era. Through Masyumi Party, Natsir campaigned for implementing sharia on the state level. Following the banning by the Suharto regime, Natsir went underground and founded Indonesian Islamic Dawah Council (DDII) in 1967. DDII built strong relations with the Middle Eastern Muslim scholars of Salafi and Wahhabi brands and played a huge role in importing these doctrines to Indonesia. During the New Order era, HMI built strong relations with the ruling Golkar Party, inducing the changes of Suharto's policy toward Muslims.

During the 1980s and 1990s, the progressive branch of neo-modernism had gained a strong presence thanks to Nurcholish Madjid and his Paramadina University. Madjid and other modernists were active in the political organization Indonesian Association of Muslim Intellectuals (ICMI). ICMI became the main vehicle for the Suharto regime's attempt to obtain Muslim support. However, Madjid later broke off with ICMI for its compromise toward the Suharto regime. Neo-modernists and Madjid had played a major role, along with progressive traditionalists such as Abdurrahman Wahid after the fall of Suharto and the democratic transition in the reformation era. After the reformation, modernists of Muhammadiyah established National Mandate Party (PAN) with Amien Rais as the chairman. Puritan branch of modernists has been absorbed to Jemaah Tarbiyah which founded Prosperous Justice Party (PKS). Neo-modernists influenced the creation of Liberal Islam Network (JIL) and the progressive Muhammadiyah Berkemajuan movement.
