= Sulaiman ar-Rasuli =

Indonesian ulama and founder of PERTI

Syekh Sulaiman ar-Rasuli سليمان الرسولي
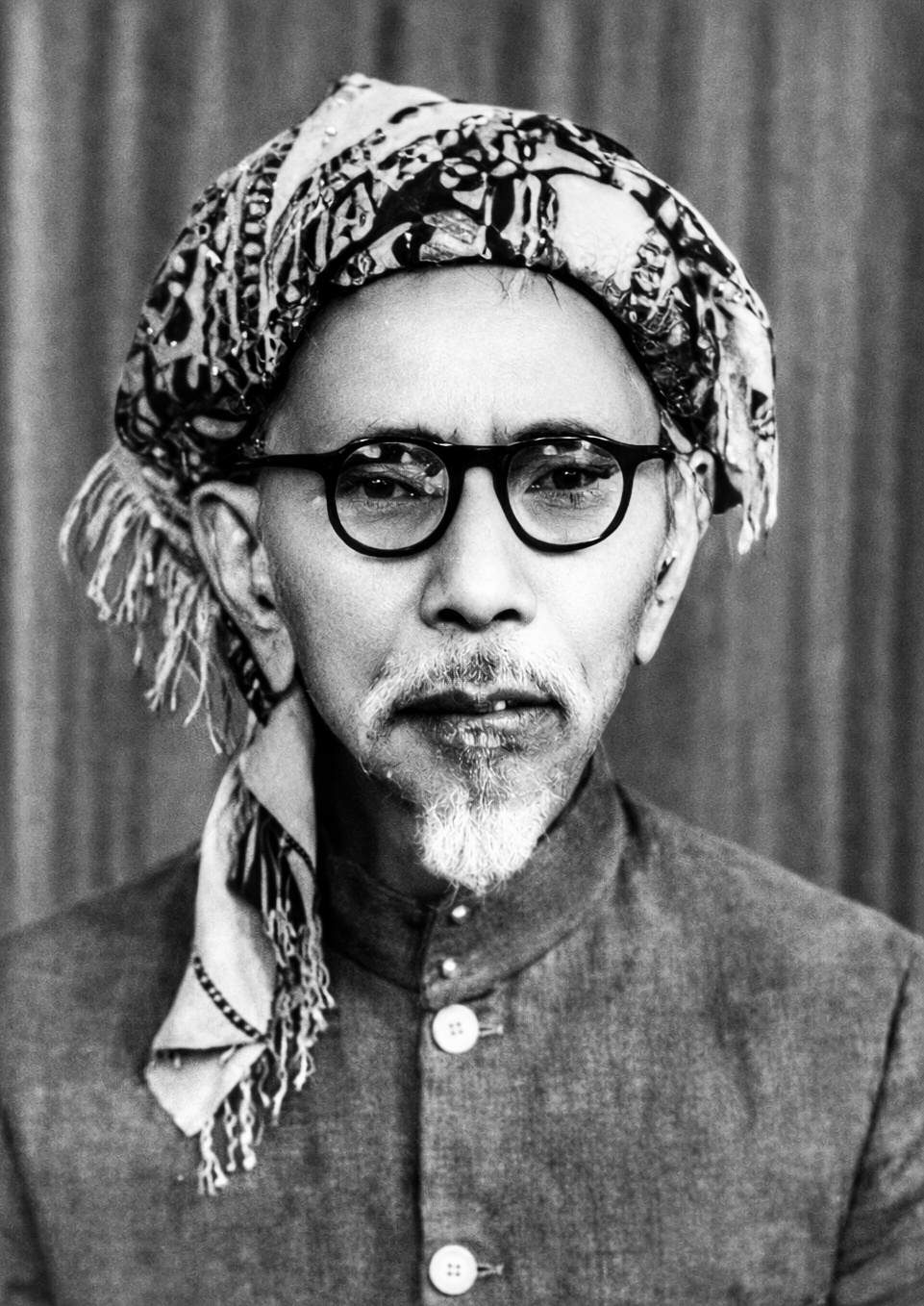
- Sulaiman ar-Rasuli
- Title: Inyiak Canduang

Personal life
- Born: December 10, 1871 Candung, Dutch East Indies
- Died: 1 August 1970 (aged 98) Candung, Indonesia
- Resting place: Madrasah Tarbiyah Islamiyah Candung
- Main interest(s): Fiqh, Aqidah, Tasawwuf, Tafsir, Sirah, Minangkabau Adat
- Notable work(s): Aqwāl al-Marḍiyah, Enam Risalah, Pedoman Hidup di Alam Minangkabau

Religious life
- Religion: Islam
- Denomination: Sunni
- Jurisprudence: Shafi'i
- Tariqa: Naqshbandi-Khalidi
- Creed: Ash'ari
- Movement: PERTI

Muslim leader
- Influenced by: Abdurrahman Batuhampar, Abdullah Halaban, Muhammad Arsyad Batuhampar, Ahmad Khatib al-Minankabawi, Mukhtar Atarid al-Bughuri, Umar Bajunaid al-Hadrami, Ahmad Shata al-Makki
- Influenced: PERTI

Sheikh Sulaiman ar-Rasuli (10 December 1871 – 1 August 1970), known as Inyiak Canduang, was an Indonesian ʿālim and founder of Union of Islamic Education (Persatuan Tarbiyah Islamiyah, PERTI), a kaum tua (traditionalist) Islamic organization from West Sumatra. He was credited for popularizing the famous Minangkabau idiom, adat basandi syarak, syarak basandi Kitabullah (traditions are founded upon the [Islamic] law, and the law founded upon the Qur'an).

== Biography ==
=== Early life ===
Sulaiman was born in Candung, Agam on 10 December 1871 to Muhammad Rasul, a local religion teacher, and Siti Buliah. In 1881, he was taught Qur'an by Abdurrahman Batuhampar, a well-known Naqshbandi murshid and grandfather of Mohammad Hatta, in Batuhampar, Lima Puluh Kota. After completed his study in Batuhampar, he visited various ulama in Minangkabau Highlands. One of those was Abdullah Halaban, a scholar who Sulaiman studied various subjects under him.

In 1903, Sulaiman went to Mecca for hajj and Islamic education. He studied under several scholars such as Ahmad Khatib al-Minankabawi, Mukhtar Atarid al-Bughuri, Umar Bajunaid al-Hadrami, Ahmad Shata al-Makki, and others. After completed his studies, he returned to Candung and opened a surau in 1908.

In 1923, he received Naqshbandi-Khalidi ijazah from Muhammad Arsyad, son of Abdurrahman Batuhampar.

=== Activities during Dutch and Japanese period ===
Sulaiman ar-Rasuli engaged in several political activities in West Sumatra. The first one was in 1918 when he elected as the head branch of Sarekat Islam in Candung. In 1921, he participated in establishing Ittihad Ulama Sumatera (Union of Sumatran Clerics), a kaum tua organization led by Muhammad Saad Mungka.

In 1928, he transformed his surau into madrasa in order to compete with kaum muda (modernist) schools like Sumatera Thawalib. Together with other kaum tua clerics like Muhammad Jamil Jaho, Abbas Qadhi, and Abdul Wahid Saleh, Sulaiman ar-Rasuli founded Persatuan Madrasah Tarbiyah Islamiyah (Union of Islamic Education School) on 5 May 1928. The organization later changed its name to Persatuan Tarbiyah Islamiyah (Union of Islamic Education, PERTI).

During Japanese occupation of West Sumatra, he became one of the founders of Majelis Islam Tinggi (High Islamic Council, MIT), an organization founded by both kaum tua and kaum muda scholars. He was chosen as the Ketua Umum (general chairman) of MIT. In 1943, he became one of the representatives from Minangkabau in conference of ulama in Singapore.

=== After independence of Indonesia ===
When PERTI held a congress on 22–24 December 1945 in Bukittinggi, ar-Rasuli approved the plan to transformed PERTI into political party. He also established Lasykar Muslimin Indonesia, a paramilitary wing of PERTI during the national revolution in 1945–1949.

In the 1955 Indonesian Constitutional Assembly election, he was elected as the member of Konstituante (Constitutional Assembly). When Konstituante held the first session on 10 November 1956, he became the head of the session.

Owing to his experience as a qadi in Candung, he was appointed as the Head of Mahkamah Syariah (Sharia Court) in Central Sumatra on 17 January 1947. He held the position until 1958.

=== Death ===
Sulaiman ar-Rasuli died on 1 August 1970 in Candung, Indonesia. He was buried in his madrasa, Madrasah Tarbiyah Islamiyah (MTI) Candung. Harun Zain, Governor of West Sumatra, instructed flags in West Sumatra to be flown at half-mast.

== Views ==
=== Islam ===
Sulaiman ar-Rasuli was widely known as one of great scholars among kaum tua in West Sumatra. Some of his well known writings are his commentaries about uṣallī recitation before salah, Quran translations, and Ahmadiyya. Two of his books about Ash'ari creed, Jawāhir al-Kalāmiyyah and Aqwāl al-Marḍiyah, are still regularly taught in MTI Candung.

As a Naqshbandi, he became an ardent defender of the Sufi order. He argued that Naqshbandi dhikr practices and rābiṭah do not violate the sharia. On the other hand, he criticized other Sufi masters who he considered had violated the Sunni creed and jurisprudence, such as in his conflict with Haji Jalaluddin of PPTI.

=== Minangkabau adat ===
ar-Rasuli played major role in introducing the relation between Islam and adat. He popularized the idiom adat basandi syarak, syarak basandi Kitabullah (traditions are founded upon the [Islamic] law, and the law founded upon the Qur'an). Six of his writings are related to this theme.

== Personal life ==
Sulaiman ar-Rasuli married 17 times and had 19 children. Three of his children were also Islamic scholars: Baharuddin, Syahruddin, and Muhammad Noer.

== Literary works ==
He wrote several books and articles regarding fiqh, ʿaqīdah, taṣawwuf, tafsīr, sīrah, and Minangkabau adat.

- Aqwāl al-‘Āliyah fī Ṭarīqah al-Naqshabandiyyah
- Aqwāl al-Marḍiyyah
- Aqwāl al-Wāsiṭah fī al-Dhikr wa al-Rābiṭah
- Tablīgh al-Amānāt
- Thamarah al-Iḥsān
- Jawāhir al-Kalāmiyyah
- Dawā’ al-Qulūb
- Sabīl al-Salāmah
- Qaul al-Bayān
- Enam Risalah
- Nasihat Maulana Syekh Sulaiman ar-Rasuli
- Pedoman Islam
- Pedoman Puasa
- Asal Pangkat Penghulu dan Pendiriannya
- Keadaan Minangkabau Dahulu dan Sekarang
- Mari Bersatu dengan Adat dan Syarak
- Pedoman Hidup di Alam Minangkabau
- Pertalian Adat dan Syarak di Minangkabau
- Sari Pati Sumpah Sati Bukit Marapalam
