= Abdullah Ahmad (cleric) =

Islamic cleric (ulama) and reformist

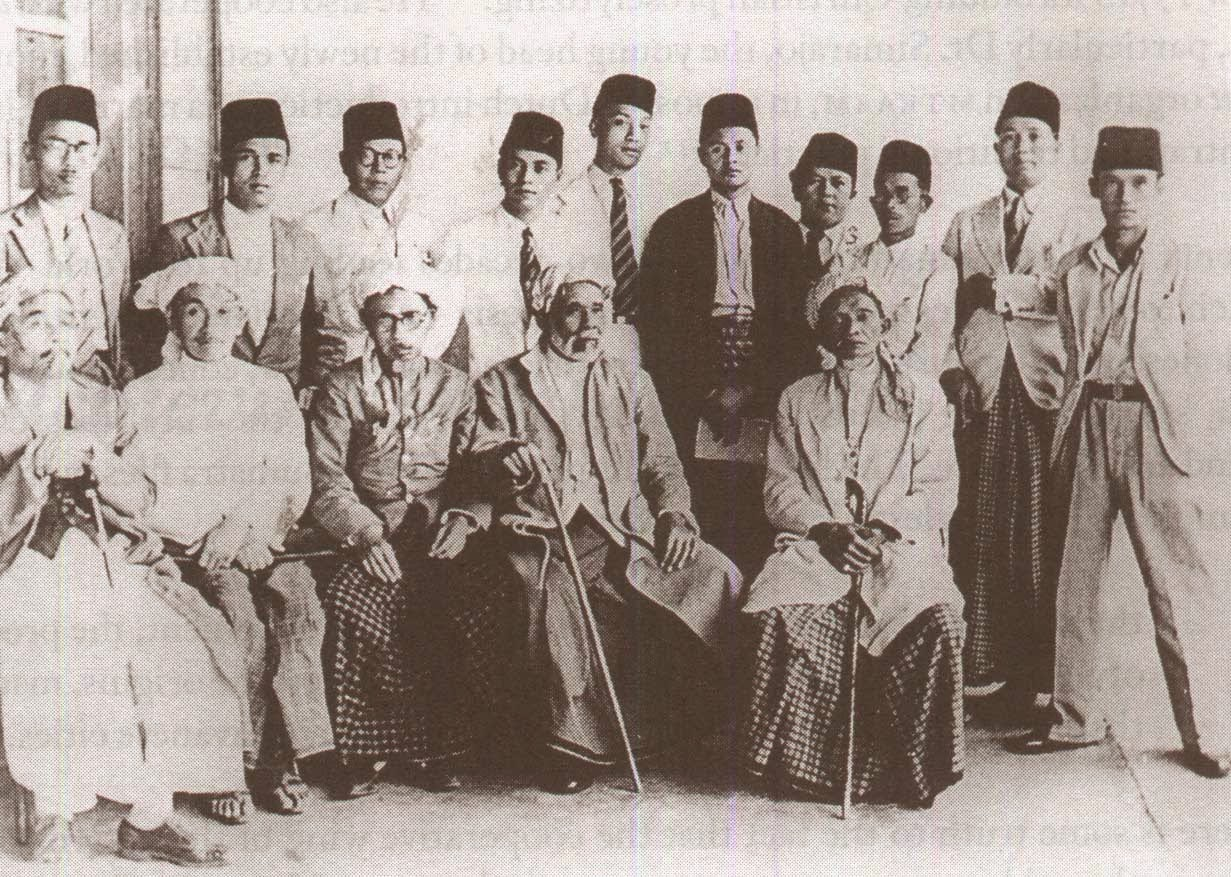
Seated from Right: Sheikh Daud Rasyidi, Sheikh Djamil Djambek, Sheikh Sulaiman Ar-Rasuli (Inyiak Canduang), Sheikh Ibrahim Musa (Inyiak Parabek), Sheikh Abdullah Ahmad

Abdullah Ahmad (1878 - 1933) was an Islamic cleric (ulama) and reformist hailed from Padang Panjang, West Sumatra. He is a founder of Islamic mass organization based in West Sumatra, Sumatera Thawalib. He also founded the Islamic magazine Al-Munir, the first Islamic mass media in the Indonesian archipelago. Together with Abdul Karim Amrullah, he became one of the first Indonesians who received the honorable degree from Al-Azhar University in Cairo.

== Biography ==
Abdullah was born to Haji Ahmad, a renowned Minangkabau ulama and merchant, and a mother from Bengkulu. Abdullah completed his basic education in the public school, however, he also acquired religious education from his family. In 1895, Abdullah went to Mecca for pilgrimage and religious study and returned in 1889. After return from Mecca, he immediately began teaching in Padang Panjang in order to purge the perceived religious non-orthodoxy such as bidah (religious innovation) and tariqa (Sufi order). As he was interested in propagating his idea through publication, later he became the agent of newly-founded Islamic magazines such as Al-Imam in Singapore and Al-Ittihad in Cairo.

In 1906, he moved to Padang for becoming a lecturer, replacing his uncle after his death. In Padang, he held Tabligh Akbar (mass religious meeting), which eventually led to the founding of Jamaah Adabiyah, a religious circle which conducted Pengajian (religious mentoring). Pengajian was held twice every week, moving around different houses.

Seeing the insufficiency of systematic religious education upon all the youths in Padang, Abdullah decided to open a religious school in 1909. He was also an active author. Later he established Al-Munir magazine which modeled after Al-Imam in 1911 and became a journalist based in Padang in 1914. He also maintained tight network throughout the religious schools in Padang, Jakarta and able to extract support from the youth organization Jong Sumatranen Bond. Utilizing this network, he helped to establish Sumetera Thawalib, one of the first modernist mass organizations in West Sumatra. His depth in the religious knowledge was recognized among the Middle Eastern scholars, and he attended the Cairo Caliphate Congress in 1926 where people discussed the aftermath of the abolition of the Caliphate. During the time, he received the honorable degree from Al-Azhar University.

== Bibliography ==
- Ricklefs, Merle Calvin (2001). A History of Modern Indonesia Since C. 1200. Stanford University Press.
