= Ismail al-Khalidi al-Minangkabawi =

Islamic scholar

Sheikh Ismail al-Khalidi al-Minangkabawi
- Born: Simabur, Pariangan, Tanah Datar, Minangkabau, Pagaruyung Kingdom
- Occupation: Ulama
- Known for: Pioneer of the Khalidiyya-Naqshbandi tariqa in Indonesian archipelago

Ismail al-Khalidi al-Minangkabawi was an Islamic scholar who belonged to the Khalidiyya branch of the Naqshbandi tariqa in the 18th to 19th century. He hailed from today's Tanah Datar Regency, West Sumatra. He is regarded as the pioneer of the tariqa in Minangkabau region, as well as the whole Indonesian archipelago. He was also known as a scholar of Islamic jurisprudence, kalam theology and tasawwuf (the science of Islamic mysticism).

== Biography ==
=== Early life ===
Ismail was born in a religious family and environment. He received the religious education since childhood. After studying the Qur'an in several suraus in his village, he learned the basics of Islamic science through kitab kuning written in Arabic-Malay script. Fields of Islamic science he studied include the jurisprudence, tawhid (science of monotheism), tafsir, hadith, and the sciences of the Arabic language.

=== Mecca years ===
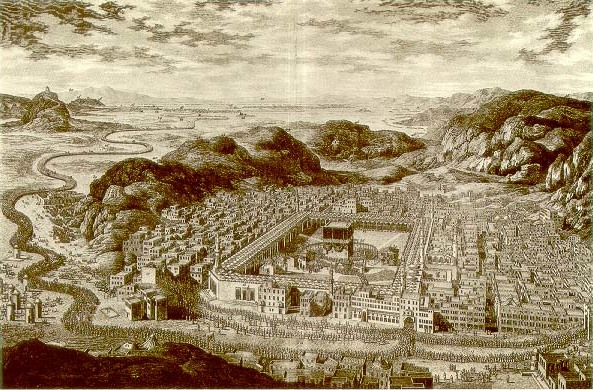
Ismail spent 30 years in Mecca for higher education during the 18th century.

He went to Mecca to perform the pilgrimage as well as to deepen the Islamic sciences he had previously acquired. He also studied in Medina for five years.

In Mecca, Ismail studied under the several renowned scholars who had expertise in their respective fields. He learned kalam theology under Sheikh Muhammad Ibn 'Ali Assyanwani. In the field of jurisprudence, he studied under Sheikh al-Azhar and Sheikh Abdullah ash-Syarqawi, both renowned as scholars of the Shafi'i school of jurisprudence. Ismail also studied the science of Sufism under two great Sufis named Sheikh 'Abdullah Afandi and Sheikh Khalid al-Uthmani al-Kurdi (Sheikh Dhiyauddin Khalid). Both were murshid (teacher of the spirituality) of Naqshbandi order.

=== Returning to Minangkabau ===
After studying in Mecca for 30 years, Ismail went back to West Sumatra and began the dissemination of the teachings of Naqshbandi tariqa. He began from his hometown, Simabur in Tanah Datar. The teachings of Ismail then spread outside Minangkabau, reaching places such as Riau, Sultanate of Langkat, Sultanate of Deli, and Sultanate of Johor. He taught tawheed based on Ash'ari and Sunni conception and jurisprudence based on Shafi'i madhhab. Regarding tasawwuf, Ismail followed the Sunni tasawwuf based on the teaching of al-Ghazali.

He began to spread the Khalidiyya-Naqshbandi tariqa after it was banned in 1827 by Sheikh Khalid al-Kurdi, one of his teachers in Mecca. During the time, Minangkabau region itself had seen the development of Shattari tariqa propagated by Sheikh Burhanuddin Ulakan earlier. Burhanuddin had developed the congregation for the first time in the archipelago in the 17th century. The latter tariqa, however, did not preclude Ismail's efforts in developing the Khalidiyya-Naqshbandi order. Both tariqas had developed in Minangkabau society, in which they gained footholds in different regions, with Shattari tariqa in the coastal regions and Naqshbandi tariqa in inland regions.

== See also ==
- Islam in West Sumatra

== Bibliography ==
- Dobbin, Christine. (1992). Kebangkitan Islam dalam ekonomi petani yang sedang berubah: Sumatra Tengah, 1784–1847. Inis.
