= Hamdan Sheikh Tahir =

Governor of Penang, Malaysia (1923–2005)

Yang Amat Berbahagia Tun Dato' Seri Utama Hamdan Sheikh Tahir SMN DUPN DP PSM DMPN KMN
- حمدان شيخ طاهر جلال الدين الفلکي

6th Governor of Penang
- In office 1 May 1989 – 30 April 2001
- Preceded by: Awang Hassan
- Succeeded by: Abdul Rahman Abbas

Personal details
- Born: 27 April 1921 Kuala Kangsar, Perak, Federated Malay States
- Died: 20 January 2005 (aged 83) George Town, Penang, Malaysia
- Parent: Sheikh Tahir Jalaluddin

Hamdan bin Sheikh Tahir (27 April 1921 – 20 January 2005) was the 6th Governor of the Malaysian state of Penang from 1989 to 2001. He was the son of Sheikh Tahir bin Jalaluddin, an influential Muslim thinker and early advocate of Malayan independence.

== Honours ==
=== Honours of Malaysia ===
- Malaysia
  - Grand Commander of the Order of the Defender of the Realm (SMN) – Tun (1989)
  - Commander of the Order of Loyalty to the Crown of Malaysia (PSM) – Tan Sri (1974)
  - Officer of the Order of the Defender of the Realm (KMN) (1965)
- Penang
  - Knight Grand Commander of the Order of the Defender of State (DUPN) – Dato' Seri Utama
  - Companion of the Order of the Defender of State (DMPN) – Dato' (1977)
- Sarawak
  - Knight Grand Commander of the Order of the Star of Hornbill Sarawak (DP) – Datuk Patinggi (1991)

Preceded by Awang Hassan	Yang di-Pertua Negeri of Penang; 1989–2001	Succeeded by Abdul Rahman Abbas
