= Harun Al Rasyid Zain =

Indonesian politician

Prof. Drs. H. Harun Al Rasyid Zain
- هارون الرشيد زين

14th Minister of Manpower and Transmigration of the Republic of Indonesia
- In office 29 Maret 1978 – 19 Maret 1983
- President: Suharto
- Preceded by: Subroto
- Succeeded by: Martono; Sudomo

3rd Governor of West Sumatra
- In office 1967–1977
- Preceded by: Saputro Brotodirejo
- Succeeded by: Azwar Anas

Personal details
- Born: March 1, 1927 Batavia, Dutch East Indies
- Died: October 19, 2014 (aged 87) Jakarta, Indonesia

Harun Al Rasyid Zain, also known as Datuk Sinaro (Jawi: هارون الرشيد زين; 1 March 1927 – 19 October 2014), was an Indonesian academics, economist and bureaucrat. He served as the Minister of Manpower and Transmigration in the Third Development Cabinet and for two periods (1967-1977) he was the governor of West Sumatra. He was also a Rector of the Andalas University in Padang, Indonesia.

== Personal life ==
Harun Zain is the sixth child of seven brothers from Sutan Muhammad Zain, a Pariangan-birth professor and a prominent language expert. He was born in Jakarta. His childhood was spent in large cities in Java such as Bandung, Batavia (now Jakarta), Yogyakarta and Surabaya as he follows his father who served as a teacher.

Harun Zain died on October 19, 2014, at the age of 87 because of his illness. His body was buried at Kalibata Heroes' Cemetery, Jakarta.

== Career ==
Harun Zain attended the University of California at Berkeley in 1958-1960. He started his career in 1961 as a lecturer at Andalas University, Padang, West Sumatra; he commuted from the University of Indonesia to Andalas. In 1962, Zain was appointed dean of the university's Faculty of Economics. In 1964, he became the rector of the Andalas University until year 1966, which was encouraged by West Sumatran figures Chairul Saleh and Hasyim Ning.

In 1966 he was appointed the Governor of West Sumatra for two periods up to 1977. In 1967, Harun Zain inaugurated an Islamic women's university in West Sumatra, at the urging of Rahmah el Yunusiyah. Harun Zain proposed the Army Brigadier General Azwar Anas to become his successor.

Because of his education in the United States on labor economics as well as his experience as governor in one of the receiving provinces from the Indonesian Transmigration program, in 1978 he was appointed to become the Minister of Manpower and Transmigration in the Third Development Cabinet and served until 1983. After finishing his career in the cabinet, he became one of the member of the Indonesian Supreme Advisory Council (Dewan Pertimbangan Agung) from 1983 to 1988, which at that time was led by Maraden Panggabean. Between 1985 and 1977, Harun Zain was also a rector of the Mercu Buana University, Jakarta.

== Honours ==
=== National ===
- Indonesia
  - Star of Mahaputera (2nd Class) (1982)
  - Guerrilla Star
  - Medal for Contributing in the National Development
  - Medal for Service as a Military Educator

=== Foreign honours ===
- Belgium :
  - Grand Officer of the Order of Leopold II
- Germany :
  - Grand Cross of the Order of Merit of the Federal Republic of Germany

== Cited works ==
- Kahin, Audrey (1999). Rebellion to Integration: West Sumatra and the Indonesian Polity, 1926-1998. Amsterdam: Amsterdam University Press. ISBN 9789053563953.
- Tirtosudarmo, Riwanto (2001). "Demography and Security: Transmigration Policy in Indonesia". In Weiner, Myron; Russell, Sharon Stanton (eds.). Demography and National Security. Berghahn Books. ISBN 9781571813398.
