= Tahir bin Jalaluddin =

Islamic Scholar (1869–1956)

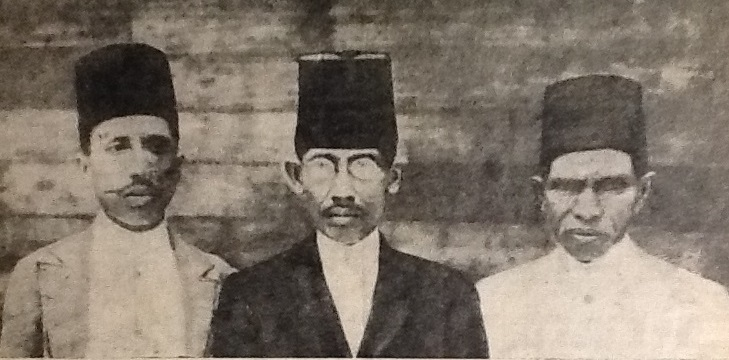
Abdul Karim Amrullah (left), Tahir Jalaluddin (center), and Daud Rasyidi (right).

Tahir Jalaluddin (8 December 1869 in Ampek Angkek, Agam, West Sumatra – 26 October 1956) was a famous Muslim ulama in Southeast Asia.

He became the editor for Al-Imam publication which was published in Singapore between 1906 and 1908.

Tahir published two major treatises on astronomy: Natijatul'Umur (published 1357 H./ 1936 M.) and Kitab Jadual Pati Kiraan (published in 1362 H./ 1941 M.) - logarithms for determining the direction of kiblat and times for prayer.

His son Hamdan bin Sheikh Tahir was a Penang state governor (Yang di-Pertua Negeri) from 1989–2002.
