= Persatuan Muslim Indonesia =

Political party

Persatuan Muslim Indonesia (lit: Union of Indonesian Muslims, or Indonesian Muslim Union), also abbreviated as PERMI, was a political party espoused Islamic-nationalism based in Padang Panjang, founded in 1930. The party was dissolved due to the crackdown by the Dutch East Indies colonial government in 1937. PERMI is regarded as a political party active against the colonial repression by the Dutch. Unlike other political parties, PERMI was unique in its embracing of both political Islam and nationalism and placed them two in a parallel position.

== History ==
PERMI was originated from the mass organization Persatuan Sumatera Thawalib, which was founded in 1928 by the former members of Sumatera Thawalib after its dissolution. At the third congress held in Padang Panjang, Persatuan Sumatera Thawalib had transformed itself into the political party. Initially, the center of activity was placed in its place of origin, however, later it had moved to Padang. Two years after the establishment, PERMI had grown into one of the prominent parties in West Sumatra, and expanded its influence to other regions such as Tapanuli, East Sumatra, Aceh, Bengkulu and South Sumatra. At its peak in December 1932, PERMI held 7,700 members, among them 4,700 men and 3,000 women. Its activity ranged from education, scouting, publishing of news outlets and pamphlets, and holding of public meetings.

=== Repression ===
Since its establishment, PERMI had already reaped suspicion among the Dutch colonial government which saw the organization as a threat. This was due to the PERMI spokespersons and politicians often referred to the Dutch repression during their campaigns. By the end of 1932, its activity began to get restricted and figures were getting apprehended. Rasuna Said, one of the leaders of PERMI who voiced against the Dutch colonization was arrested in December 1932. Other figures who got arrested simultaneously including Rasimah Ismail, a women's rights activist. Muchtar Lutfi, an intellectual of PERMI was arrested in July 1933. Several other PERMI leaders were put under house arrest. Eventually, the party was restricted from the gathering. Under this condition, PERMI leaders had attempted to communicate each other through written methods, however, they also got confiscated. The author Ilyas Ya'kub and the publisher Djalaluddin Thaib were arrested in September. Lutfi, Ya'kub and Thaib were exiled to Boven-Digoel in 1934. These repressions had effectively disabled the party, and the remaining leader Muhammad Sjafei had dissolved the party on October 18, 1937.

== Ideology ==
PERMI's position on both Islam and nationalism reflected the understanding of these issues shared among the Minangkabau society during the time. This position criticized the other nationalist parties which were chiefly modeled after the nationalist movement in India and inclined to be reluctant to see Islam as a unifying factor of the national struggle. In PERMI's view, as a nation whose 90% of the population adheres to Islamic identity, the fear of accepting Islamic principle was as if "tiger is afraid to enter into the jungle, or water refuses to flow into the sea." Because of this, PERMI often challenged both secular nationalist parties and Islamic parties which perceived as taking one-dimensional approach. Mohammed Natsir, a leading figure of PERSIS, an Islamic mass organization founded during the National Awakening Era, scoffed PERMI as Islam in the name only, and he attempted to build the authenticity of PERSIS on the ground of dedication toward Islam in contrast with PERMI. The philosophy of PERMI also differed from the certain Minangkabau figures such as Mohammad Hatta who, albeit himself a Muslim, opposed to the idea of a religious political party from the position of the separation of church and state.

PERMI's ideology was highly influenced by Islamic Modernism promoted by Rashid Rida, who advocated for the return to the Qur'an and hadith, compatibility of Islam and modern scientific education and abolishing of non-orthodoxy and innovations. Modernism in Indonesia was already proliferated among the Muslim society in West Sumatra. However, it was only after the establishment of PERMI that such philosophy had gained the vehicle for political mobilization. PERMI's position was further reinforced by the return of two Minangkabau Islamic intellectuals from Cairo, Iliyas Ya'kub and Muchtar Lutfi. Ilyas Ya'kub, in the header of the February 1931 issue of the political magazine Medan Rakjat, grieved the situation of Indonesian society for what he called a split between the Muslim and nationalist blocs. In his view, although two ideologies have different origins, they have no contradiction in their respective aims. He called for the inclusion of the PERMI slogan "Islam and nationalism" into the political arena in order to solve the crisis.

== See also ==
- Islam in West Sumatra
- Indonesian National Awakening

== Bibliography ==
- Ingelson, John. (1979). Road to Exile: The Indonesian Nationalist Movement 1927-1934. Asian Studies Association of Australia.
