= Muhammad Jamil Jambek =

Indonesian scholar (c. 1860–1947)

Sheikh Muhammad Jamil Jambek
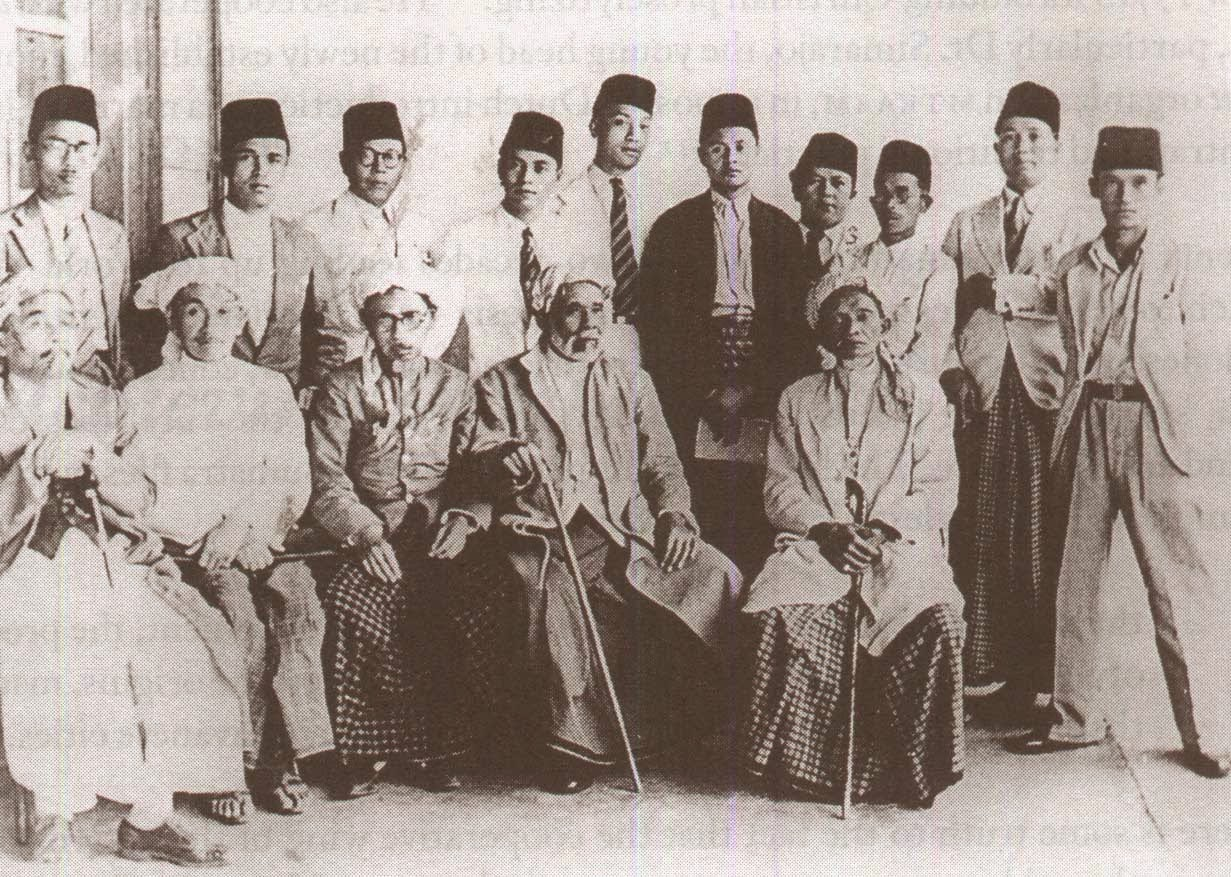
- Seated from Right: Sheikh Daud Rasyidi, Sheikh Djamil Djambek, Sheikh Sulaiman ar-Rasuli (Inyiak Canduang), Sheikh Ibrahim Musa (Inyiak Parabek), Sheikh DR. Abdullah Ahmad
- Born: Mohammad Djamil Djambek; 1860 or 1862; Fort de Kock, Dutch East Indies
- Died: December 30, 1947; Bukittinggi, Indonesia
- Occupation: Ulama
- Children: Saadoeddin Djambek; Dahlan Djambek
- Parent: Saleh Datuak Maleka
- Awards: Bintang Mahaputra Utama (1995)

Muhammad Jamil Jambek (1860 or 1862 - 1947), or better known as Sheikh Muhammad Jambek, was one of the pioneers of Islamic modernist reformers in Indonesia, hailed from Bukittinggi, Minangkabau region in the late 19th century. He was also known as an astronomer. His works criticized the perceived deviation from the Islamic orthodoxy widespread in Minangkabau society, and inspired the subsequent expansion of Islamic modernist movements in West Sumatra.

== Early life ==
Jambek was born of a noble family. His father, Saleh Datuak Maleka, was a penghulu of Kurai village, and his mother was a Sundanese. His childhood is little known, however, it is known that he received his education at the training institution for teachers. Later he was taken to Mecca by his father at the age of 22 to learn Islam.

=== Mecca years ===
When in Mecca, Jambek studied under the prominent Minangkabau Islamic scholar Ahmad Khatib al-Minangkabawi. He was initially interested in learning witchcraft, but al-Minangkabawi repudiated the subject. He learned the fields of Islamic science during the stay, and intensively studied especially about the science of the tariqa, eventually entering the seclusion in Jabal Abu Qubais. Later he obtained the diploma of tariqa from the Khalidiyya-Naqshbandi order. He also built expertise in the field of astronomy and gained wide recognition in Mecca for the knowledge. He managed to teach the fellow Minangkabawi scholars regarding this subject while his stay in the city. Among his disciples are Ibrahim Musa Parabek (the founder of Tawalib Parabek College) and Abbas Abdullah (the founder of Tawalib Padang Japang Lima Pulu Kota College).

== Career ==
In 1903, Jambek returned to his homeland. He chose to apply his knowledge directly to the community, by the teaching of the science of monotheism (tawhid) and recitation (tajwid). Among his students were several tariqa teachers, and he was respected as the "Sheikh of Tariqa". Until the time, he founded two suraus, Surau Tengah Sawah and Surau Kemang, both of which are known as Surau Inyik Jambek. Within the surau, he introduced several new methods and approaches of education, namely tablig, a storytelling regarding the birth of the prophet in the Malay language, replacing marhaban (praise) which was the recitation in Arabic during the commemoration of the Islamic prophet Muhammad, for the purpose of further propagating Islam in all the societal classes.

Over time, his attitude and views on tariqa began to change. At the beginning of 1905, when a clerical meeting was held to discuss the legitimacy of the tariqa which took place at Bukit Surungan, Padang Panjang, Jambek was on the opposing side against the tariqa, confronting several well-known figures such as Hajji Abbas. He then authored a book titled Penerangan Tentang Asal Usul Thariqatu al-Naksyabandiyyah dan Segala yang Berhubungan dengan Dia (Introduction to the Origin of Naqshbandi Tariqa and the whole Connections to it) on criticism of tariqa consisting of two volumes. In the publication, he accused Naqshbandi tariqa as a specific creation by Persian and Indian civilizations, which were mired in superstition distant from the original teaching of Islam. Another book he wrote entitled Memahami Tasawuf dan Tarekat (Understanding Sufism and the Tariqa) was intended to bring about the renewal of Islamic thought. In general, however, he did not take a hostile approach toward Minangkabau customs (adat). In 1929, Jambek established an organization called the Minangkabau National Association with the purpose of nurturing, respecting and embracing local customs. During the Japanese occupation, Sheikh Muhammad Jambek established the Upper Islamic Council (MIT) centered in Bukittinggi.
