= Lake Maninjau =

Maninjau
- Danau Maninjau (Indonesian) دانااو مانينجاو (Jawi)
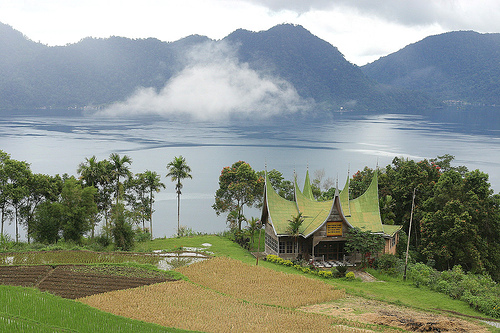

- Location within Sumatra
- Location: West Sumatra, Indonesia
- Coordinates: 0°19′S 100°12′E
- Type: Caldera lake
- Part of: Antokan basin
- Primary outflows: Antokan River
- Basin countries: Indonesia
- Max. length: 16 km (9.9 mi)
- Max. width: 7 km (4.3 mi)
- Surface area: 99.5 km^{2} (38.4 sq mi)
- Average depth: 105 m (344 ft)
- Max. depth: 165 m (541 ft)
- Water volume: 10.4 km^{3} (8,400,000 acre⋅ft)
- Shore length^{1}: 52.68 km (32.73 mi)
- Surface elevation: 459 m (1,506 ft)
- ^{1} Shore length is not a well-defined measure.

Lake Maninjau (Indonesian: Danau Maninjau, meaning "overlook" or "observation" in the Minangkabau language) is a caldera lake in West Sumatra, Indonesia. It is located 36 kilometres (22 mi) to the west of Bukittinggi, at 0°19′S 100°12′E.

== Formation ==
The Maninjau caldera was formed by a volcanic eruption estimated to have occurred around 52,000 years ago. Deposits from the eruption have been found in a radial distribution around Maninjau extending up to 50 kilometres (31 mi) to the east, 75 kilometres (47 mi) to the southeast, and west to the present coastline. The deposits are estimated to be distributed over 8,500 square kilometres (3,300 sq mi) and have a volume of 220–250 cubic kilometres (53–60 cu mi). The caldera has a length of 20 kilometres (12 mi) and a width of 8 kilometres (5.0 mi).

== The lake ==
Lake Maninjau has an area of 99.5 square kilometres (38.4 sq mi), being approximately 16 kilometres (9.9 mi) long and 7 kilometres (4.3 mi) wide. The average depth is 105 metres (344 ft), with a maximum depth of 165 metres (541 ft). The natural outlet for excess water is the Antokan river, located on the west side of the lake. It is the only lake in Sumatra which has a natural outlet to the west coast. Since 1983, this water has been used to generate hydroelectric power for West Sumatra, generated around 68 MW at maximum load.

Most of the people who live around Lake Maninjau are ethnically Minangkabau. Villages on the shores of the lake include Maninjau and Bayur.

Maninjau is a notable tourist destination in the region due to its scenery and mild climate. It is also a site for paragliding.

== Local fishing and agriculture ==
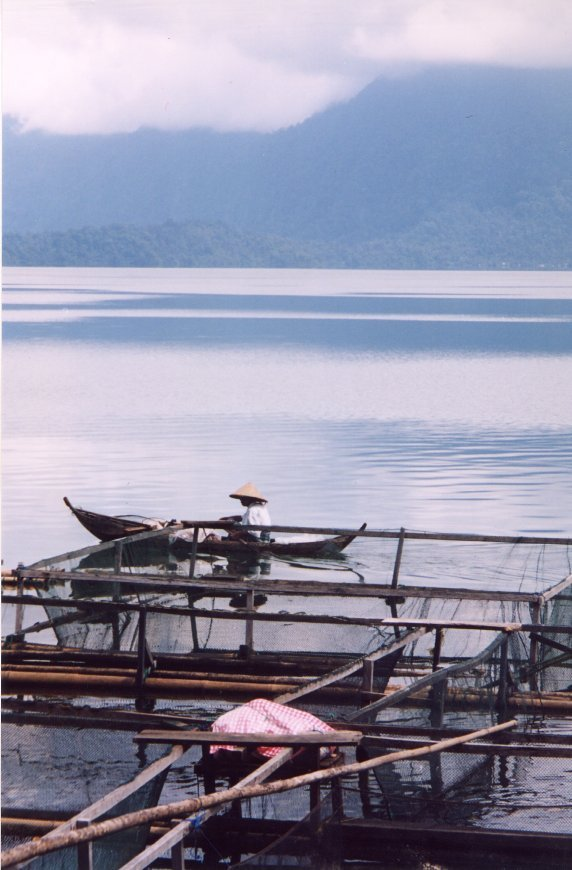
Fisherman on Lake Maninjau

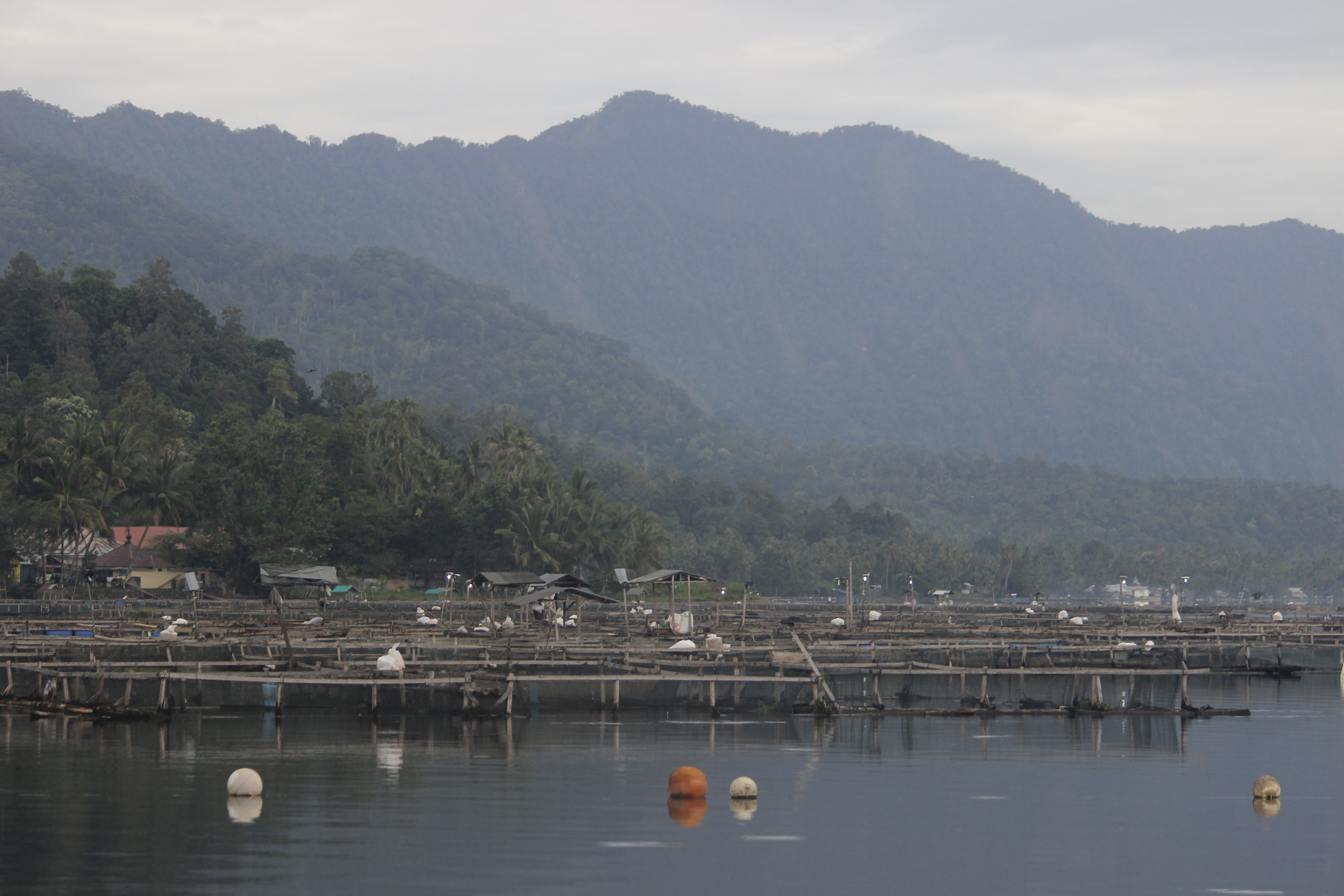
Fish embankment in the lake

Two endemic species collected from the lake for local consumption and for export to markets outside the crater are pensi, a species of small mussel, and palai rinuak, a type of small fish. One method of preparing palai rinuak is to grill a mixture of the fish along with coconut and spices, wrapped in a banana leaf.

The lake is used for aquaculture, using karamba floating net cages. The technique was introduced in 1992 and, by 1997, there were over 2,000 cage units with over 600 households engaged. Each cage may have 3-4 production cycles each year. There is evidence of pollution around some karamba areas.

On the edge of the lake, land use includes rice fields in the swamps and the lower slopes. The villages are bordered uphill by a large belt of forest-like tree gardens, which dissolve into the upper montane forest on the steepest parts of the slopes up to the ridge of the caldera.

The tree gardens include three typical components:

- Fruit trees including durian, jack fruit, cempedak, rambutan, langsat, golden berries and water apples.
- Timber species including Toona sinensis and Pterospermum javanicum.
- Spice trees including cinnamon, coffee, nutmeg and cardamum.

== Sukarno's pantun ==
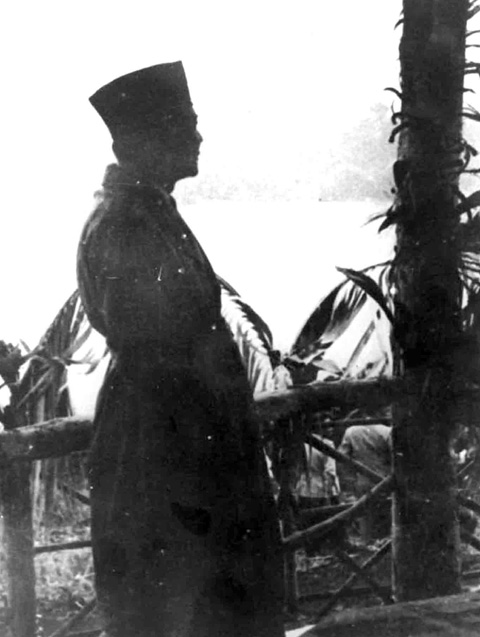
President Sukarno and his entourage visited the Maninjau area, West Sumatra on June 10, 1948, for a working visit to the island of Sumatra.

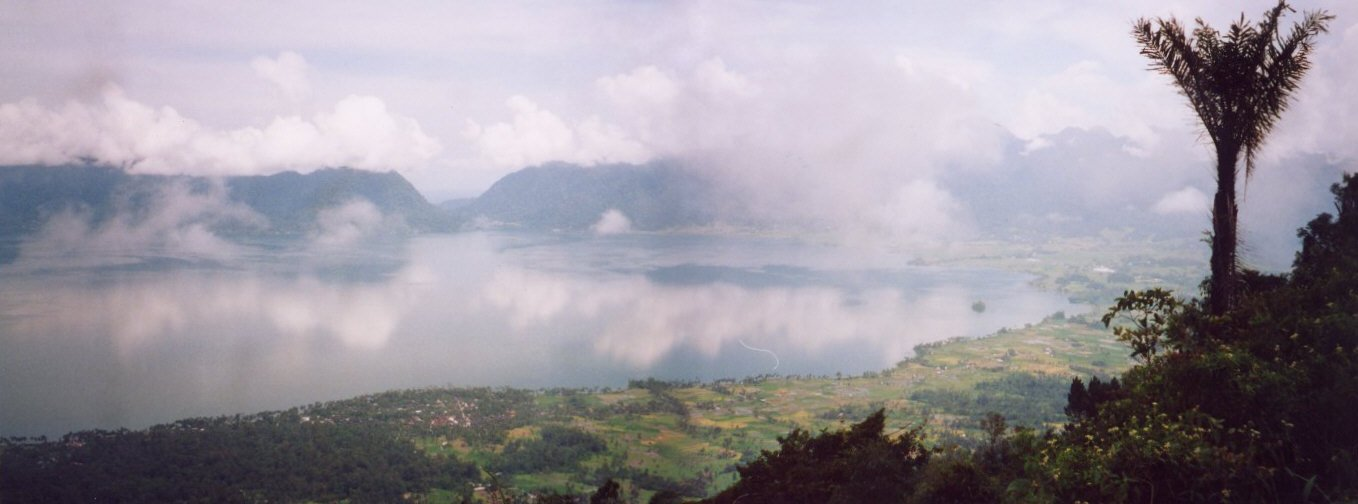
Panorama of Lake Maninjau from the caldera rim

The first president of Indonesia, Sukarno, visited the area in early June 1948. A pantun he wrote about the lake reads:

Jangan dimakan arai pinang,
Kalau tidak dengan sirih hijau.
Jangan datang ke Ranah Minang,
Kalau tidak singgah ke Maninjau.

Translation:

Do not eat arai nut,
If not with a green betel.
Do not come to Minang lands,
If you do not stop at Maninjau.

== See also ==
- List of lakes of Indonesia
