= Rasuna Said =

Indonesian independence activist

Hajjah Rangkayo Rasuna Said
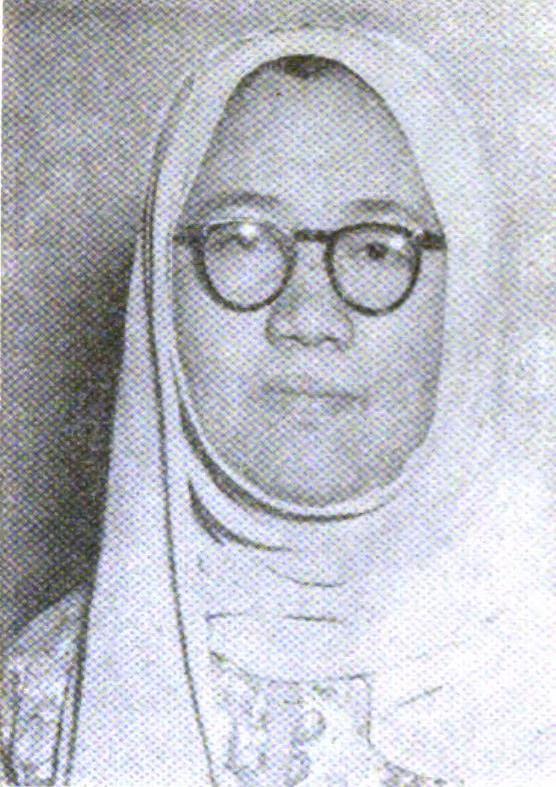
- Rasuna Said c. 1954
- Born: 14 September 1910; Maninjau, Agam, Dutch East Indies
- Died: 2 November 1965 (aged 55); Jakarta, Indonesia
- Other name: H.R. Rasuna Said
- Known for: National Hero of Indonesia

Hajjah Rangkayo (Note: Hajjah is a title which is term of respect for women who have completed the Hajj pilgrimage to Mecca, while 'Rangkayo' is a traditional title referring to a person of good character and wealth.) Rasuna Said (Indonesian pronunciation: [rasuna 'saʔid], 14 September 1910 – 2 November 1965) was a campaigner for Indonesian independence and women's rights, particularly their rights to education and participation in politics. Being politically active herself prior and after Indonesia's independence, Rasuna Said became a member of various political organizations and later served as a member of the Provisional People's Representative Council and the Supreme Advisory Council under Sukarno's tenure. Due to her involvement in Indonesia's struggle for independence, she was recognized posthumously as an Indonesian national heroine.

== Early life ==
Rasuna Said was born in Maninjau on 14 September 1910. Her family were devout Muslims. She grew up in the house of her uncle as her father's work often took him away from home. Unlike her siblings, she attended a religious, rather than secular, school and later moved to Padang Panjang, where she attended the Dininyah school, which combined religious and secular subjects. In 1923, she became an assistant teacher at the newly established Diniyah Putri girls' school, founded by Rahmah el Yunusiyah, but returned to her hometown three years later after the school was destroyed by an earthquake. The scholar Peter Post states that Said was asked to resign by Yunisyah because she was teaching political subjects to the students, which Yunisiyah forbade. She then studied for two years at a school linked to political and religious activism, and attended speeches given by the school director about nationalism and Indonesian independence.

== Pre-independence political activities ==
In 1926, Rasuna Said became active in the communist-affiliated Sarekat Rakyat (Peoples Union) organization, which was dissolved following a failed communist uprising in West Sumatra in 1927. The following year, she became a member of the Islamic Union Party, rising to a position in the leadership of the Maninjau branch. Following its establishment in 1930, she joined the Union of Indonesian Muslims (Persatuan Muslim Indonesia, Permi), an organization based on Islam and nationalism. That following year, Rasuna who was once again teaching in Padang Panjang, left her job after a disagreement with her employer as Rasuna had been teaching her students about the need for political action to bring about Indonesian independence, and moved to Padang, where the Permi leadership was based. There, she established a school for girls.

On 23 October 1932, at a public meeting of the Permi women's section in Padang Panjang, Rasuna made a public speech entitled "Steps to the Independence of the People in a Greater Indonesia" in which she condemned the ruination of people's livelihoods and the damage done to the Indonesian people by colonialism. She also said that the Quran condemned colonialism. A few weeks later, in another speech in Payakumbuh before a thousand people, she said the Permi's policy was to treat imperialism as the enemy. Despite a warning from an official, she continued by once again saying the Quran called imperialism the enemy of Islam. She proclaimed, "We must achieve Indonesian independence, independence must come." Shortly afterwards she was arrested and charged with "sowing hate", becoming the first Indonesian woman to be charged with a Speekdelict – speaking offense. She was subsequently sentenced to 15 months in jail, which gave her national prominence as her trial and sentencing were widely reported. She used her trial to call for independence, and attracted widespread support. She was jailed in Semarang, Central Java. More than a thousand people came to witness the departure of the ship taking her to Java.

We struggle with conviction! If we win in our struggle, we will get two benefits. First, Indonesia will be free; second, paradise as promised by God. And if we fail – but we are not allowed to – then indeed a free Indonesia will not be achieved, but paradise still awaits. This is our conviction!

— Letter sent by Rasuna Said to the Permi board while awaiting trial.

Rasuna was released from jail in 1934. She studied at a Permi teacher training college in Padang for four years. She also worked as a journalist, writing articles criticizing Dutch colonialism in the Raya college journal. In 1938 she moved to Medan, then returned to Padang after the Japanese invasion of the Dutch East Indies. She was arrested by the Japanese because of her membership of a pro-Indonesian independence organization, but was released after a short time as the authorities feared causing public discontent. In 1943 she joined the strongly nationalist Giyūgun military volunteer force, which had been established by the Japanese occupation government in West Sumatra. She helped to establish the women's section, Hahanokai.

== Post-independence political career ==
After the 17 August 1945 proclamation of Indonesian independence, Rasuna worked with pro-republic organizations, and in 1947 became a senior member and head of the women's section of the National Defense Front (Fron Pertahanan Nasional). She later joined Volksfront, which was a component of the Struggle Union established by nationalist-communist Tan Malaka. As a result of friction between this organization and the regional government, Rasuna was placed under house arrest for a week. Rasuna was also a member of the Sumatra Representative Council (Dewan Perwakilan Sumatra), and in July 1947 became a member of the Central Indonesian National Committee (KNIP), the provisional legislature. Ahead of the body's sixth session in 1949, she was appointed to the KNIP Working Committee representing Sumatra. In 1950, she became a member of the Provisional People's Representative Council. In 1959 she was appointed a member of the Indonesian Supreme Advisory Council (Dewan Pertimbangan Agung), a position she held until her death in Jakarta in 1965.

== Women's rights campaigner ==
A devout Muslim, Rasuna campaigned actively for women's educational and political rights, believing that her reformist convictions provided a basis for advocating for women. Her religious beliefs convinced her that women should be educated. When she moved to Padang in 1931, she was dismayed to find that women were barred from education and active politics. There she founded a school and established a Permi section for women and girls. By 1933, Permi, which had been founded by younger activists who supported women's right to religious education, had thousands of female members. Unlike other Islamic organizations, women were not sidelined in a subordinate section, but had key roles in the party leadership. However, she defended Islamic marriage laws, including polygamy, arguing that the problems it caused were the result of problems with society, not the law itself.

== Personal life ==
In 1929, Rasuna married Duski Samad, a teaching colleague and political activist. Her parents did not approve of the marriage. They had a daughter, but the marriage ended in divorce early in the 1930s. She later secretly married Bariun AS, although she said that the independence struggle was more important than her husband.

== Death and aftermath ==
Rasuna died in Jakarta of breast cancer on 2 November 1965. She is buried in the Kalibata Heroes' Cemetery in South Jakarta. On 13 November 1974 was declared a National Hero of Indonesia for her services to the struggle for independence by president Suharto, only the ninth woman to be accorded this honour. Jalan H.R. Rasuna Said, one of the main arteries in Jakarta, is named after her.

== Works cited ==
- Cribb, R.B; Kahin, Audrey (2004). Historical Dictionary of Indonesia. Scarecrow Press. ISBN 9780810849358.
- "HR Rasuna Said, Sang Orator Ulung" [HR Rasuna Said, the Gifted Orator]. Republika (in Indonesian). Jakarta: PT Republika Media Mandiri. 3 October 2014.
- Indrawati, Nita (12 November 2019). "Walikota Sawahlunto Deri Asta Sandang Gelar Sangsako Adat" [Mayor of Sawahlunto Deri Asta gives tranitional Rangkayo Mudo Dirajo honour]. Padangmedia.com (in Indonesian). PT Padang Media Press.
- Tim Penyusun Sejarah (1970), Seperempat Abad Dewan Perwakilan Rakyat Republik Indonesia [A Quarter Century of the People's Representative Council of the Republic of Indonesia] (PDF) (in Indonesian), Jakarta: Sekretariat DPR-GR, archived from the original (PDF) on 7 April 2023
- White, Sally (2013). "Rasuna Said: Lioness of the Indonesian Independence Movement". In Blackburn, Susan; Ting, Ting (eds.). Women in Southeast Asian Nationalist Movements (PDF). NUS Press. pp. 98–123. doi:10.2307/j.ctv1qv1g3.9. ISBN 978-979-96532-1-5. JSTOR j.ctv1qv1g3.9.
- Winda, D.A., ed. (2009). Profil 143 Pahlawan Indonesia [Profiles of 143 Indonesian Heroes] (in Indonesian). Yogyakarta: Pustaka Timur. ISBN 978-979-3837-31-4.
