= Abdul Karim Amrullah =

Muslim reformer (1879–1945)

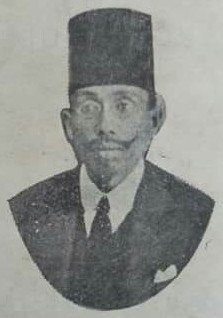
Abdul Karim Amrullah

Abdul Karim Amrullah (born as Muhammad Rasul; 10 February 1879 – 2 June 1945), known as Haji Rasul, was a Muslim reformer from Sumatra, Dutch East Indies (now Indonesia).

== Personal life ==
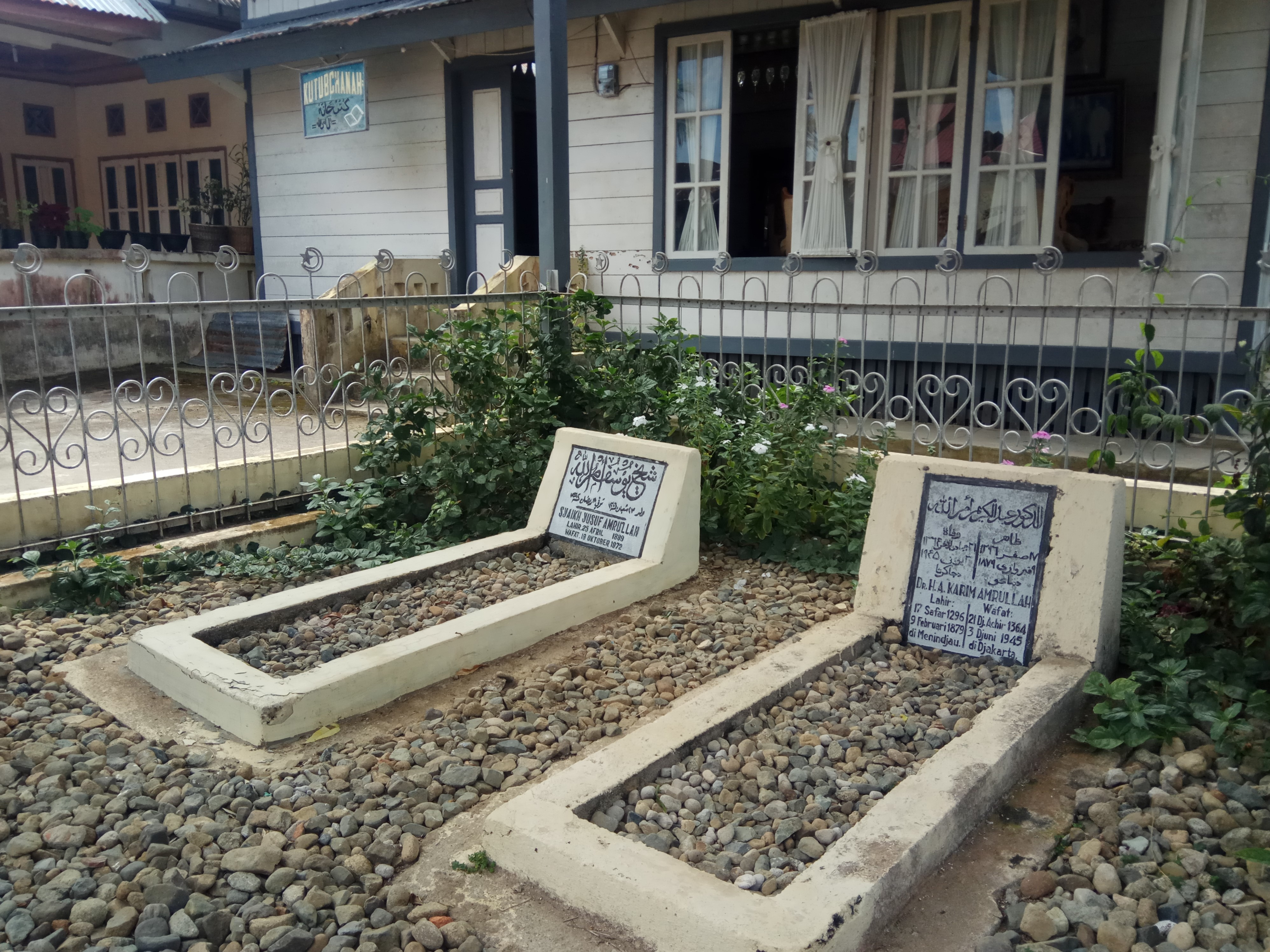
Tomb of Yusuf Amrullah and Abdul Karim Amrullah in Maninjau

Haji Rasul was born in Sungai Batang, Maninjau, West Sumatra on February 10, 1879. His father was Muslim ulema, Syekh Muhammad Amrullah Tuanku Kisai and his mother Andung Tarawas. In 1894, he went to Mecca, studying Islamic law under Shaikh Ahmad Khatib. After he graduated, he taught Islam in Mecca until 1906. Upon his return to the Dutch East Indies (now Indonesia), he founded an Islamic organization known as Muhammadiyah in West Sumatra. In 1915, Haji Rasul founded Sumatera Thawalib in Padang Panjang. Thawalib was an Islamic school that produced many progressive students. He died in Jakarta before independence day on June 2, 1945.

== Family ==
Haji Rasul's son Hamka was also a prominent ulama, politician, and author. Rusdi Hamka, his grandson, is a politician, a member of DPR from United Development Party. His grandchild, Sutan Amrull, is a noted makeup artist and drag performer in the United States, known by the stage name Raja Gemini who won the third season of RuPaul's Drag Race and returned to compete on the winners-only seventh season of RuPaul's Drag Race All Stars.

== See also ==
- Islam in Indonesia
- List of Minangkabau people
