= Tuanku Tambusai =

Indonesian national hero

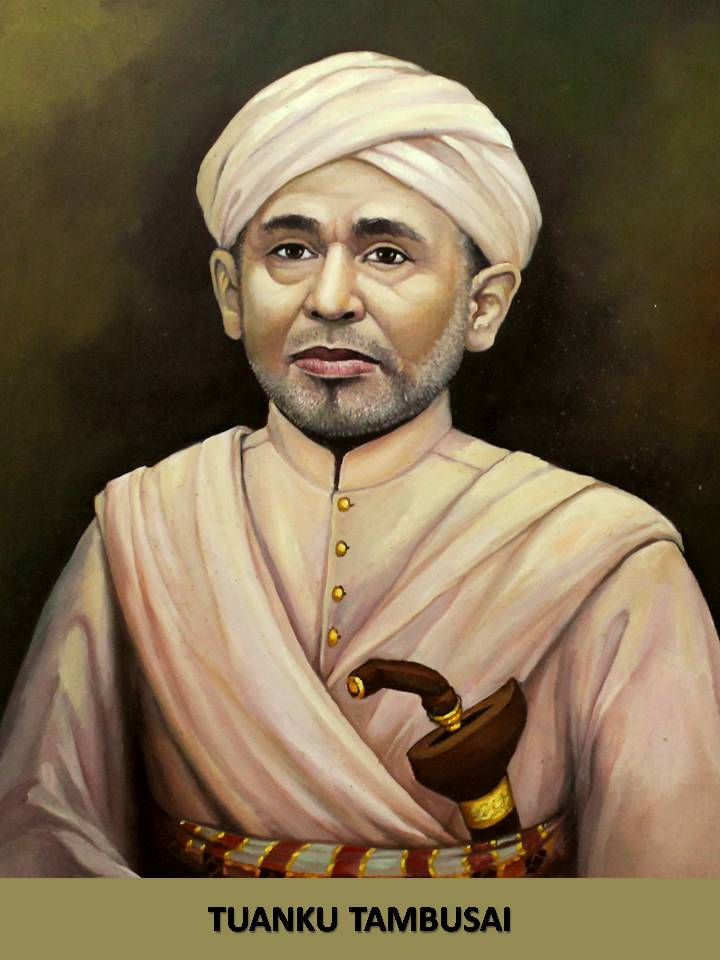
- Born: Muhammad Saleh bin Maulana Kadhi; November 5, 1784; Dalu-dalu, Rokan Hulu, Kingdom of Tambusai
- Died: November 12, 1882 (aged 98); Rasah, Sungai Ujong
- Resting place: Rasah, Seremban, Negeri Sembilan, Malaysia
- Other names: De Padrische Tijger van Rokan (by the Dutch); Tok Ungku
- Known for: Padri War
- Awards: National Hero of Indonesia

Sheikh Haji Muhammad Saleh bin Imam Maulana Kadhi (5 November 1784 – 12 November 1882), better known as Tuanku Tambusai, was an Islamic leader in the Padri movement. He fought the Adat and Dutch colonists during the Padri Wars in 1838, along with his contemporaries, Tuanku Imam Bonjol and Tuanku Rao.

== Early life ==
Muhammad Saleh was born in Dalu-dalu, a village in Tambusai (today part of Riau Province, Indonesia) on 5 November 1784. He was the son of an Islamic teacher from Rambah, Minang in western Sumatra, and a woman named Munah, who came from a village in Tambusai called Kandang Kopuh. Prior to his birth, his father was appointed chief imam by the King of Tambusai.

During Muhammad Saleh's childhood, his father taught him martial arts and horseback riding. He also learned from Islamic scholars in Bonjol and Rao. He was also inspired by the understanding of salaf from the teaching of Muhammad ibn Abdul Wahab during his time in Mecca. Muhammad Saleh became the leader of the Padri movement in Tambusai and was granted the title Tuanku Tambusai – meaning – Lord of Tambusai, by the King.

== Padri Wars ==
Tuanku Tambusai began his campaign against the Dutch in his native Rokan Hulu and surrounding vicinities, centred at the Dalu-dalu fort. Then he expanded his operations in Natal in 1823. In 1824, he led the combined troops from Dalu-dalu, Lubuksikaping, Padanglawas, Angkola, Mandailing and Natal to fight the Dutch. He had time to perform the Hajj and was also asked by Tuanku Imam Bonjol to study the development of Islam in the Arab world.

In 1833, Tuanku Tambusai began gaining a following in the valley of Rao.

In May and June 1834, Tuanku Tambusai and his forces besieged two Dutch ports, in Huta Nopan and slightly further south.

Over a period of 15 years, Tuanku Tambusai was quite troublesome for the Dutch troops that they frequently asked for military backup from troops in Batavia. Thanks to his ingenuity, Fort Amerongen, a Dutch fortress, was destroyed. Bonjol, which had fallen into Dutch hands, could be recaptured although it did not last long. Not only facing the Dutch, Tuanku Tambusai also braved the troops of Raja Gedombang, regent of Mandailing, and Tumenggung Kartoredjo who sided with the Dutch. For his constant resilience in resisting the Dutch and his lack of intention of pacifying with them, the Dutch nicknamed him the "Padri Tiger of Rokan" (Dutch: De Padrische Tijger van Rokan). His firmness was shown by refusing Colonel Elout's invitation to make peace.

On 28 December 1838, the Dutch eventually prevailed when they captured his stronghold in Dalu-dalu. Through a secret door, he managed to escape from getting besieged by the combined forces of the Dutch troops and their allies. He travelled along the Batang Sosah river towards the Strait of Malacca until he reached Rasah, a village in the chiefdom of Sungai Ujong, British Malaya (now comprising Seremban and Port Dickson Districts, Negeri Sembilan, Malaysia) where he also involved in the resistance against the British until he died of old age in 1882.

== Honours ==
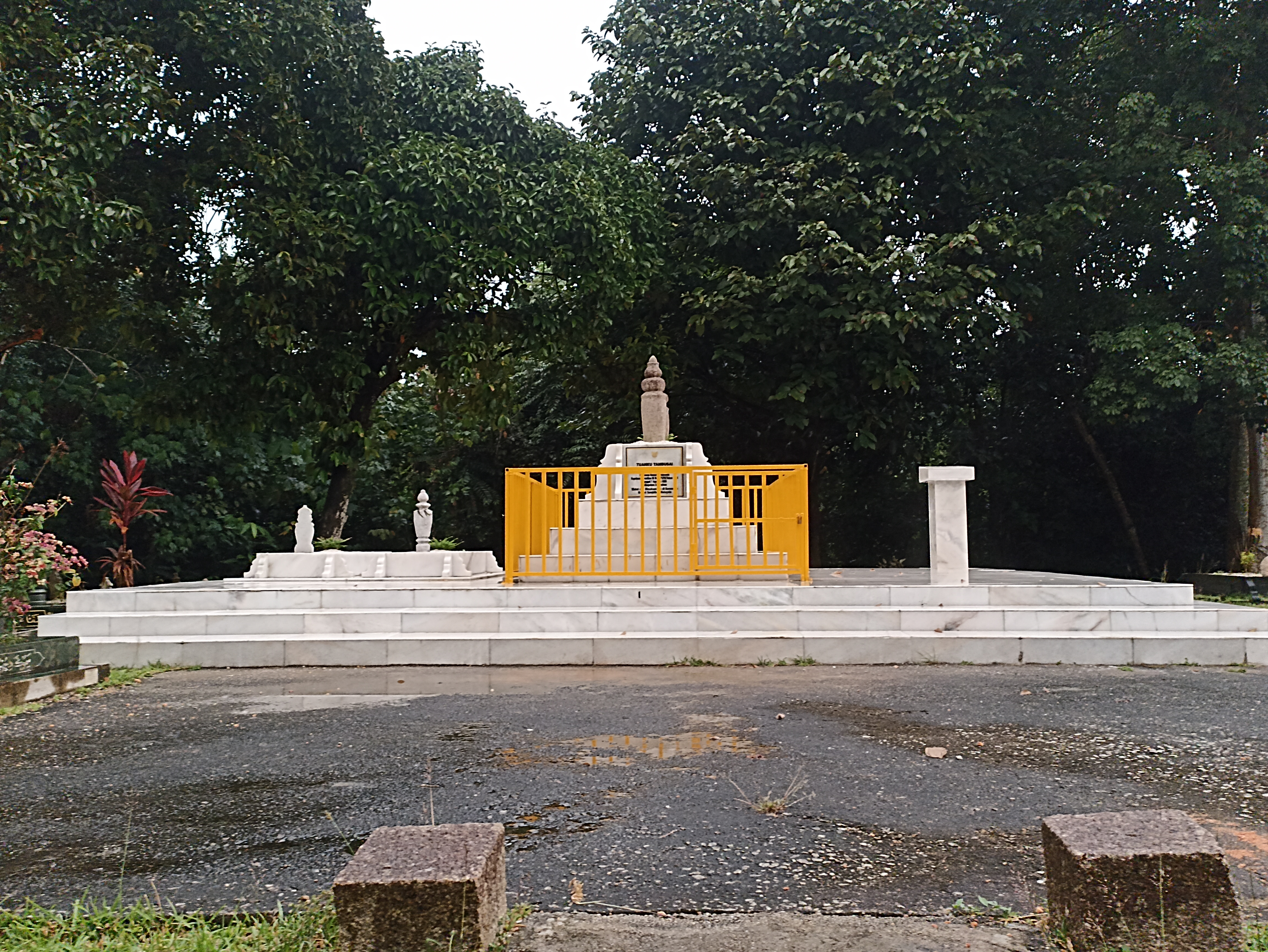
Tuanku Tambusai's grave in Rasah, Seremban, Negeri Sembilan, Malaysia.

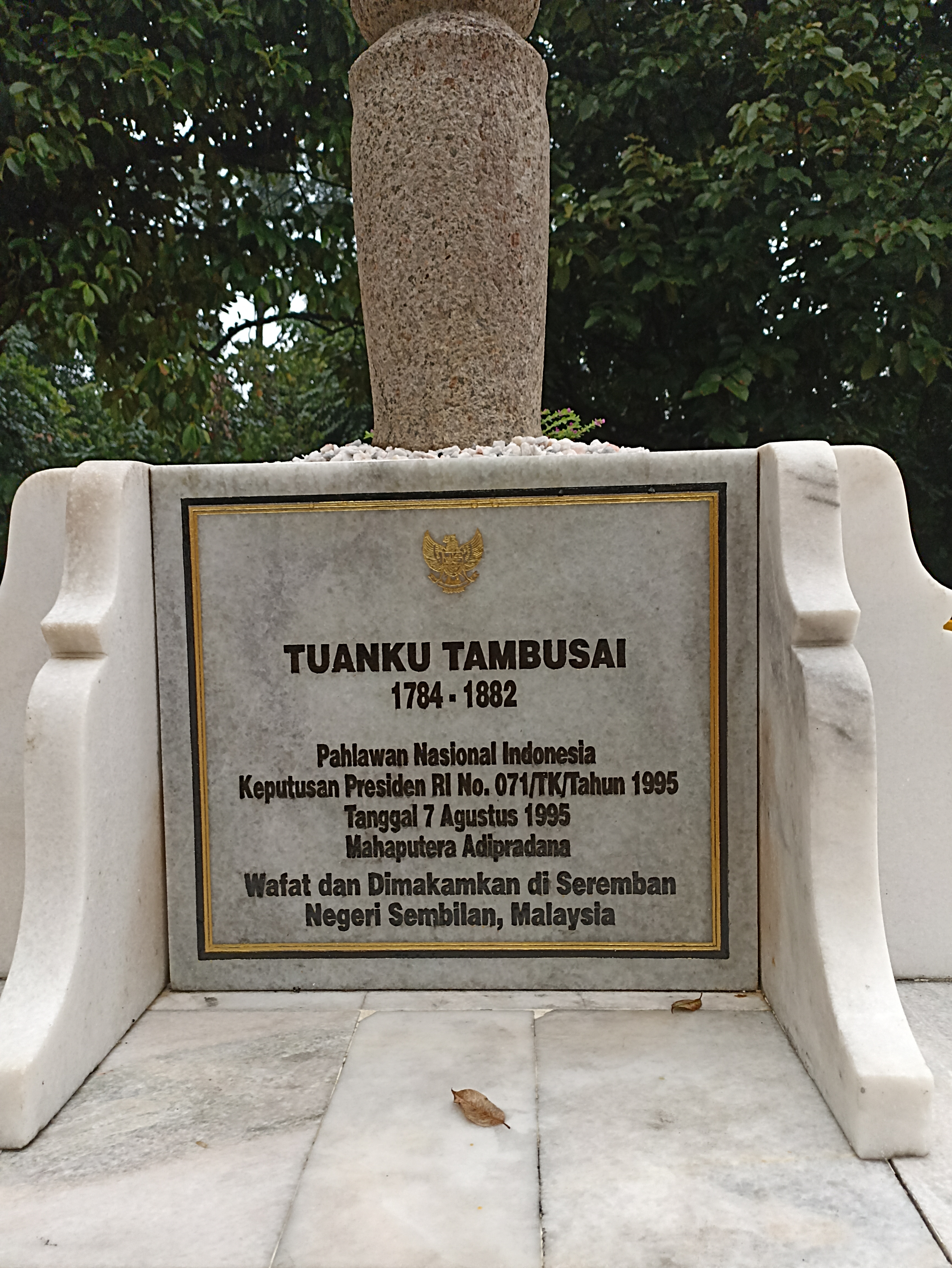
Closeup of grave

For his services in opposing the Dutch colonialists in the Dutch East Indies and his contributions to nationalism in Indonesia, on 7 August 1995, the Indonesian government appointed him a national hero, posthumously bestowed the title of Mahaputera Adipradana.

== Legacy ==
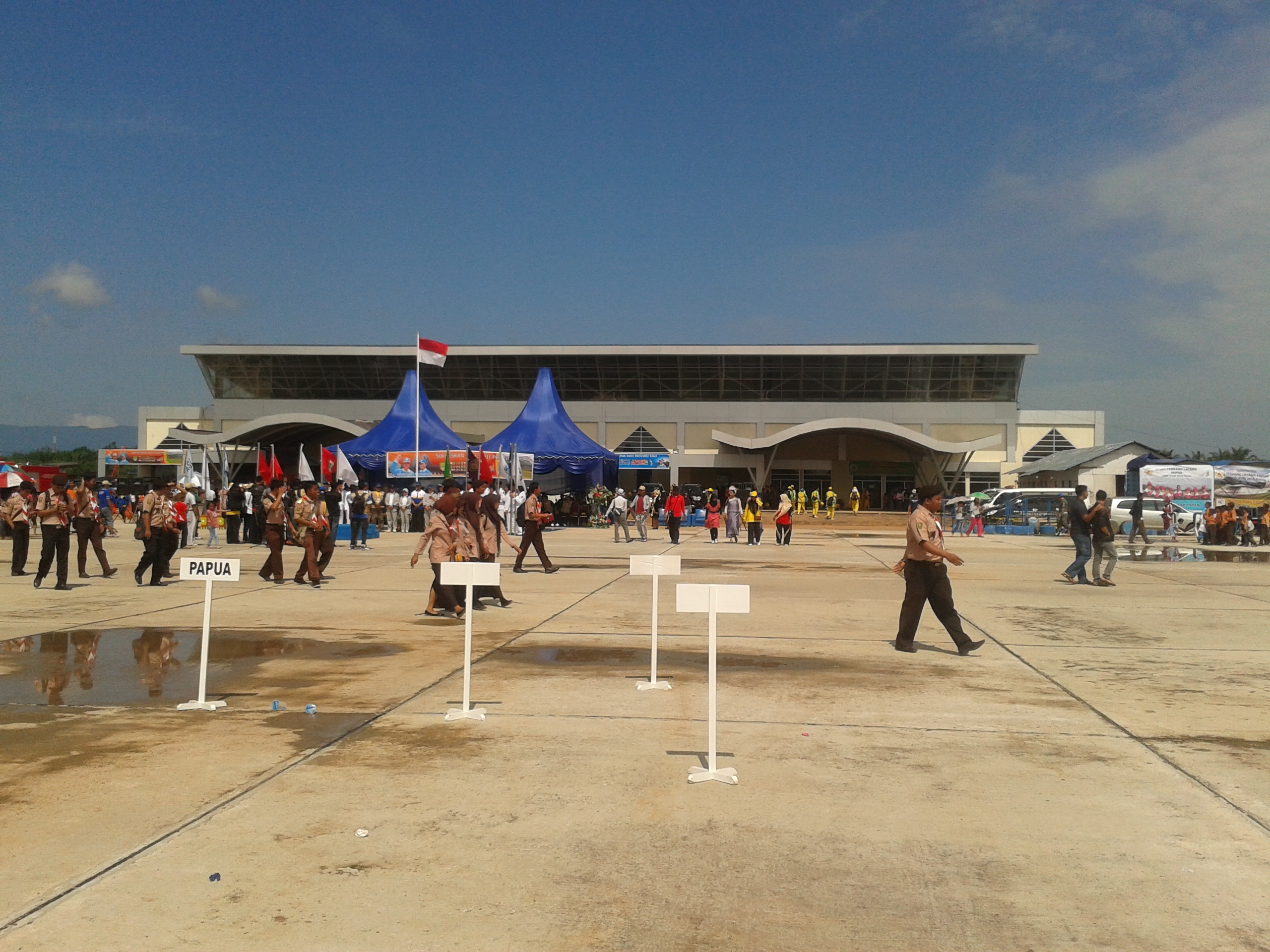
Tuanku Tambusai Airport, Rokan Hulu

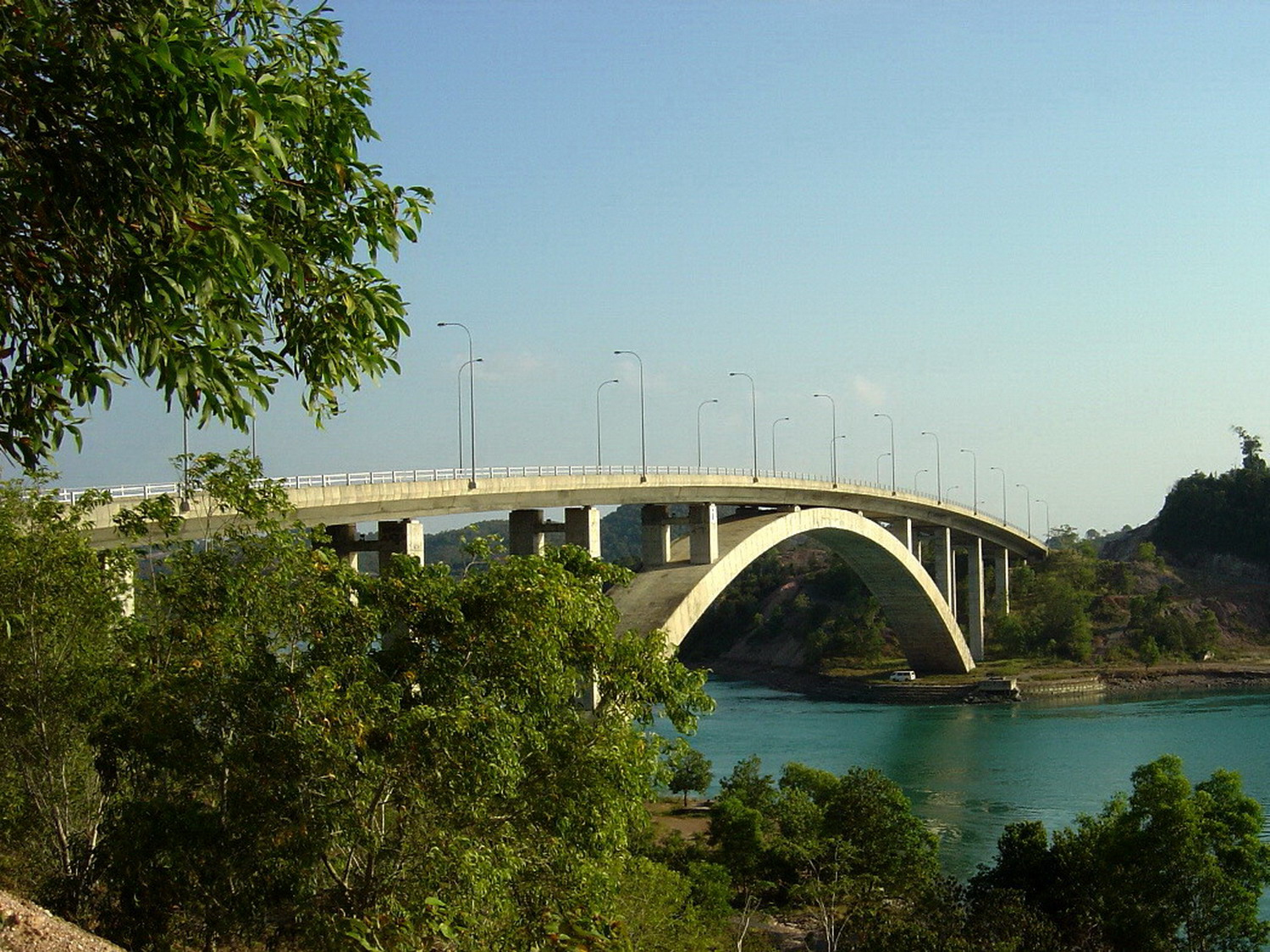
Tuanku Tambusai Bridge, Batam

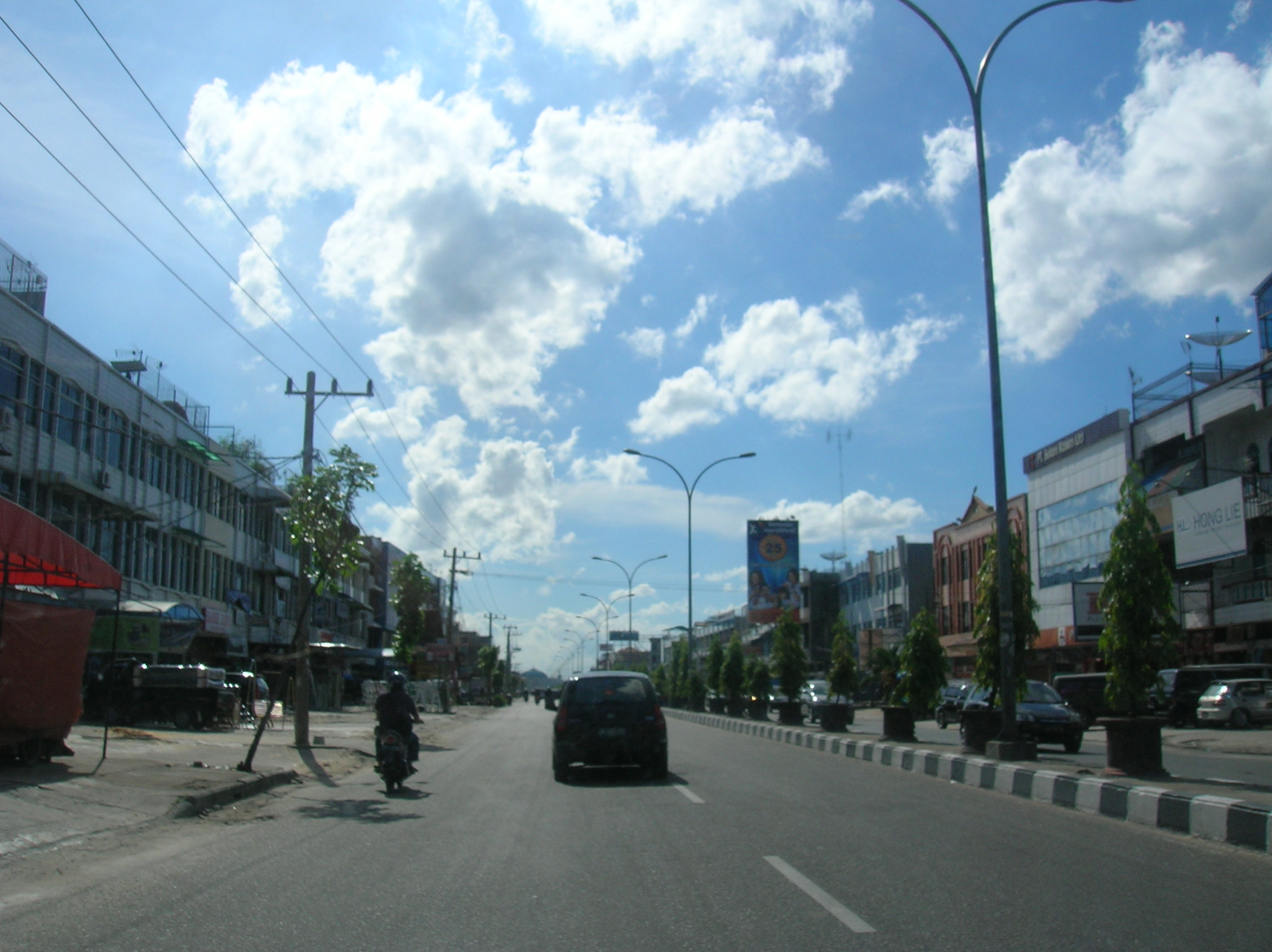
Jalan Tuanku Tambusai, Pekanbaru

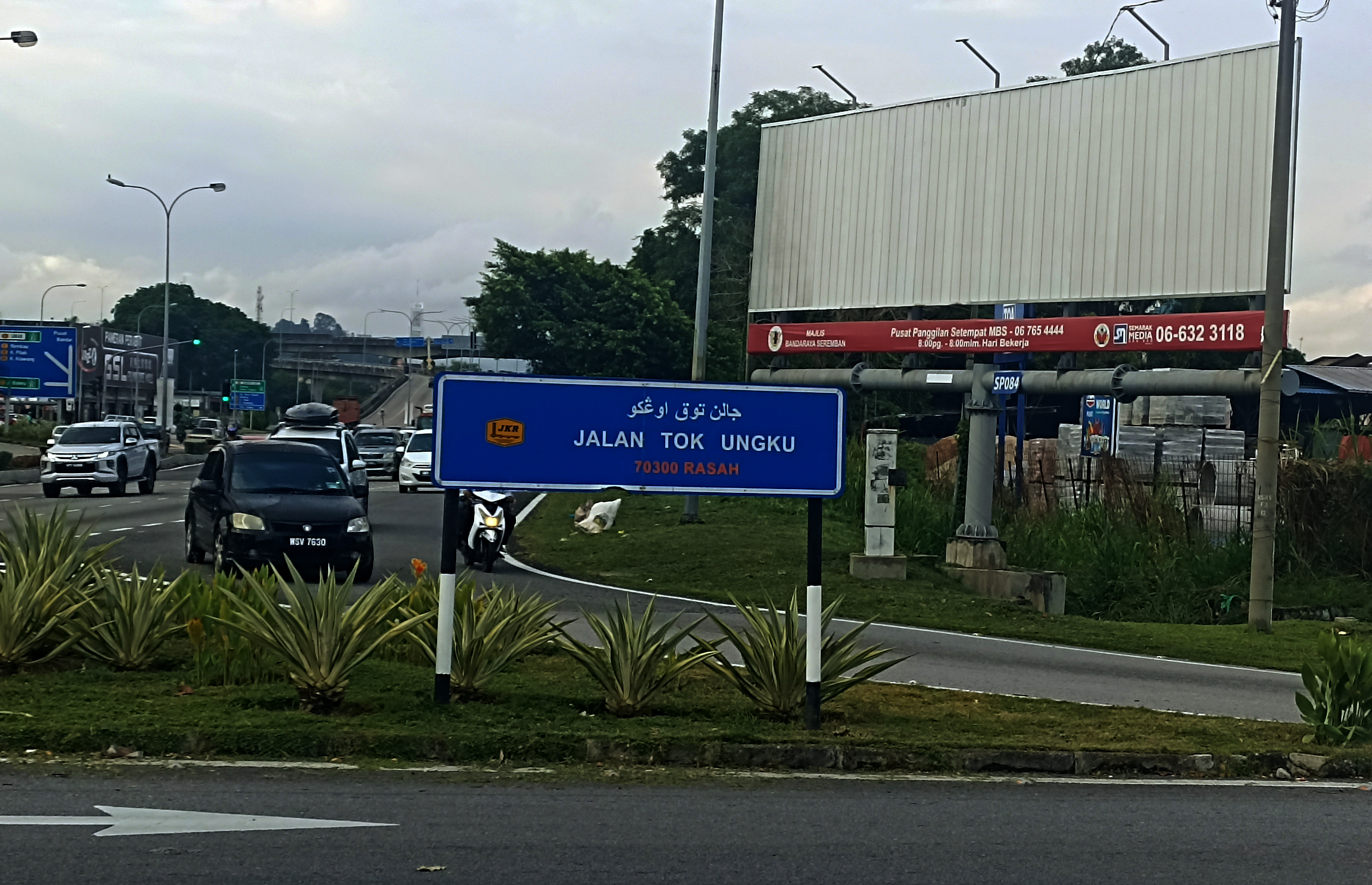
Jalan Tok Ungku, Seremban

=== Places named after Tuanku Tambusai ===
There are many places in Riau that are named after Tuanku Tambusai, such as Tuanku Tambusai Airport and Tuanku Tambusai University in Rokan Hulu, Tuanku Tambusai Stadium in Bangkinang, and Jalan Tuanku Tambusai in the provincial capital of Pekanbaru.

Tuanku Tambusai Bridge, a part of the larger Barelang Bridge in Batam, Riau Islands, is named after him.

In Seremban, Negeri Sembilan, Malaysia, a road that connects Rasah on Federal Route 53 with Rahang is renamed Jalan Tok Ungku (former name: Jalan Loop) in his honour.

=== In other media ===
Tuanku Tambusai is a subject of an eponymous Riau folk song composed by Husni Thamrin in 1995.
