= Tuanku Nan Tuo =

Indonesian Islamic scholar (1723–1830)

- Born: 1723; Koto Tuo, IV Angkek, Agam, Minangkabau, Pagaruyung Kingdom
- Died: 1830 (aged 106–107)
- Occupation: Ulama
- Children: Siti Saerah

Tuanku Nan Tuo (1723–1830) or Tuan Ku Nan Tua was one of the leading Minangkabau ulamas. He was known as a wasatiyyah (moderate) cleric, who took syncretic approaches in the religious outlook, and was a Sufi and aspired for reformation and purification of Islam in the Agam region of West Sumatra at the same time. He also played a crucial role in the birth of Minangkabau Islamic reformers known as padri. Tuo however, disagreed with the more radically puritanical views espoused by padris including Tuanku Nan Renceh and Tuanku Imam Bonjol.

== Early life ==
Tuanku Nan Tuo was born in Koto Tuo, IV Angkek, Agam, in 1723. During his youth, he was a passionate teenager about studying the Islamic sciences. He studied Islam from Tuanku Mansiangan Nan Tuo in Paninjau, Tanah Datar. He also acquired ilmu mantiq (logic) and ilmu ma'ani (kalam) from Tuanku Nan Kaciak in Koto Gadang, studied the discipline of Sharaf and nahwu (sciences of Arabic comprehension) from Tuanku in Talang and Tuanku in Salayo respectively, as well as sciences of hadith, tafsir, and usul al-fiqh such as faraidh (Islamic inheritance jurisprudence) from Tuanku in Sumanik.

== Career ==
In 1784, Tuanku Nan Tuo became the head of Tarekat Syattariyah surau in Koto Tuo of IV Angkek. When he became the principal of the surau he managed to attract thousands of students from the surrounding villages. Education taught in his surau other than sharia was martial arts pencak silat. The discipline was given so that each student was skilled and able to use weapons in a combative situation. One of his outstanding students, Haji Miskin, followed him in the propagation of sharia in the area of Agam Tuo. In addition, some of his militant students were assigned to preach in IV Angkek, especially to the nagari of trade ventures. Some of his students who continued their efforts in instilling sharia in Minangkabau were Jalaluddin Fakih Shagir who founded surau in Campak Koto Laweh, Agam, Tuanku Bandaro from Alahan Panjang who struggled with Tuanku Imam Bonjol, Tuanku Rao in Rao who took over the nagari leadership and preached in his homeland, and Saidi Muning who held the area in Lintau, Tanah Datar. His efforts of expounding sharia were further accelerated by the demand by the local traders surrounding the suraus for security under the sharia regulations. By the 1790s in the IV Angkek region, Agam, regulations regarding trade affairs had advanced greatly and as a result, he had been known as the "patron of traders."

== Padri War ==
Tuan Ku Nan Tuo disagreed with the extremist fanaticism and militant violence: Especially of Tuan Ku Nan Renceh, Tuan Ku Lintau, and Tuan Ku Pasaman. Tuan Ku Nan Tuo was a highly respected authority on Islam and the Padri desperately needed his blessing. Nan Tuo refused and he held steadfast to the Middle Way. In this rift, Nan Renceh would declare himself Imam Besar (great leader) and belittle his teacher Nan Tuo as Rahib Tua (old monk).

Despite Nan Tuo being the mentor and teacher of the main Padri leaders, they then wreaked revenge upon the Syattariyah order for Nan Tuo's insolence. Syattariyah centres like Paninjauan were razed to the ground. The area around Ampat Angkat (in Agam) was savagely attacked. They murdered the ulama and urang cerdek (intelligentsia). Any wealth was looted and plundered. The captured women were forced to be their wives and concubines.

The Padri warred against Koto Tuo for 6 years during which Nan Tuo's sons were killed in battle. Koto Tuo held out until 1821 when the Dutch won back the area. Even before the Dutch offensive, Nan Tuo had managed to rally support against the Padri in villages from Candung to Padang Tarab. Tuan Ku Nan Tuo died in 1824.
