= Tuanku Rao =

Tuanku Rao (1790-1833) was an Islamic cleric (ulama), leader and commander. He was a prominent figure among the Kaum Padri, a group of Islamic reformists who advocated for a puritanical approach in Islam inspired by Muhammad ibn Abd al-Wahhab in the early 18th century West Sumatra. He also contributed to the proselytization of Islam among the Batak people. He died during the Padri War in 1833.

== Biography ==
=== Early life ===
Rao was born to a Minangkabau family, hailed from Rao, Pasaman in West Sumatra. His father was from Tarung-Tarung, Rao, and his mother was from Padang Mantinggi, Rao. During his adolescence, Rao deepened the knowledge of Islam at the surau of the prominent ulama Tuanku Nan Tuo in Koto Tuo, Agam, and then proceeded to the surau in Bonjol. He completed the science of Islamic jurisprudence with the honorable title thayyib jiddan (very satisfying), awarded by Fakih Muhammad.

=== Padri Movement ===
Rao was one of the Padri warlords, fighting against the Dutch East Indies colonial government in Pasaman, Kotanopan, Padang Lawas and Padang Sidempuan. After the Dutch troops conquered Matur and Lubuk Sikaping in October 1832, Rao was surrounded. Lieutenant Bevervoorden, a commander of the Dutch forces, met Rao and persuaded him to surrender. During the meeting, Rao argued that he would go to Hajj and hand over the leadership of his government to his father-in-law, Yang Dipertuan Rao.

After the meeting, Rao withdrew and hid in the forest. However, inspired by Tuanku Tambusai, who had just returned from Mecca, he was encouraged to continue fighting against the Dutch. To initiate the propagation of padri movement in Batak land, Rao attacked the Dutch defense in Air Bangis with the help of Tuanku Imam Bonjol. On January 29, 1833, Rao was intercepted by Dutch troops. His resistance was pierced after he was severely injured by bullet wounds. He was then sent by the Dutch to exile, during which he died shortly after. His body was allegedly dumped into the sea by Dutch troops.

== Posthumous controversy ==
The association between the history of Tuanku Rao, padri movement and the Indonesian patriotism was briefly challenged by the so-called amateur historians who criticized the ideology of padris during the Sukarno regime era. The scrutiny was held by a Mandailing writer Mangaradja Onggang Parlindungan in his work Tuanku Rao: Hambali Islamic Terror in the Batak Lands (1816-1833). The revisionism was criticized by the prominent Indonesian Islamic intellectual Hamka in his work Tuanku Rao’ Between Fact and Fantasy, and the retired Indonesian official Rusli Amran through the vigorous references to the historical archive.
