= Ruit van Bonjol =

Ruit Bonjol
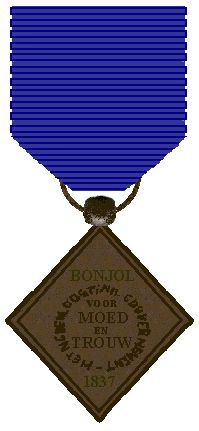
- The medal
- Awarded for: conquest of the fortress Bonjol
- Country: Netherlands
- Motto: Voor Moed en Trouw
- First award: 1838

The Ruit Bonjol commemorates the conquest of the fortress Bonjol in the former Dutch East Indies in 1837 after the prolonged Padri War against Tuanku Imam Bonjol and his followers.

== Sources ==
- P.J.d'Artillac Brill Sr., "Beknopte geschiedenis der Nederlandse Ridderorden", 1951
- H.G. Meijer, C.P. Mulder en B.W. Wagenaar, "Orders and Decorations of The Netherlands",1984
- J.A. van Zelm van Eldik, Moed en Eer, 2003
