= Tuanku Pasaman =

Tuanku Pasaman was an Islamic cleric (ulama) and leader of West Sumatra, Indonesia. He was a prominent Padri, who were a group of Islamic reformists who advocated for the puritanical approach in Islam inspired by Muhammad ibn Abd al-Wahhab in the early 18th century in West Sumatra. Little is known of Pasaman, apart from his role during the Padri War.

In 1815, he led a Padri group and stormed the government office of Pagaruyung Kingdom, and toppled the Sultan Arifin Muningsyah who escaped to Lubuk Jambi. Stamford Raffles, who traveled around Pagaruyung in 1818, recorded that Pasaman looted the remains of the burned-down castle.

== See also ==
- Islam in West Sumatra
