= Padri Wars =

1803–1837 armed conflict in Sumatra, Indonesia

- Part of Dutch Colonial campaigns
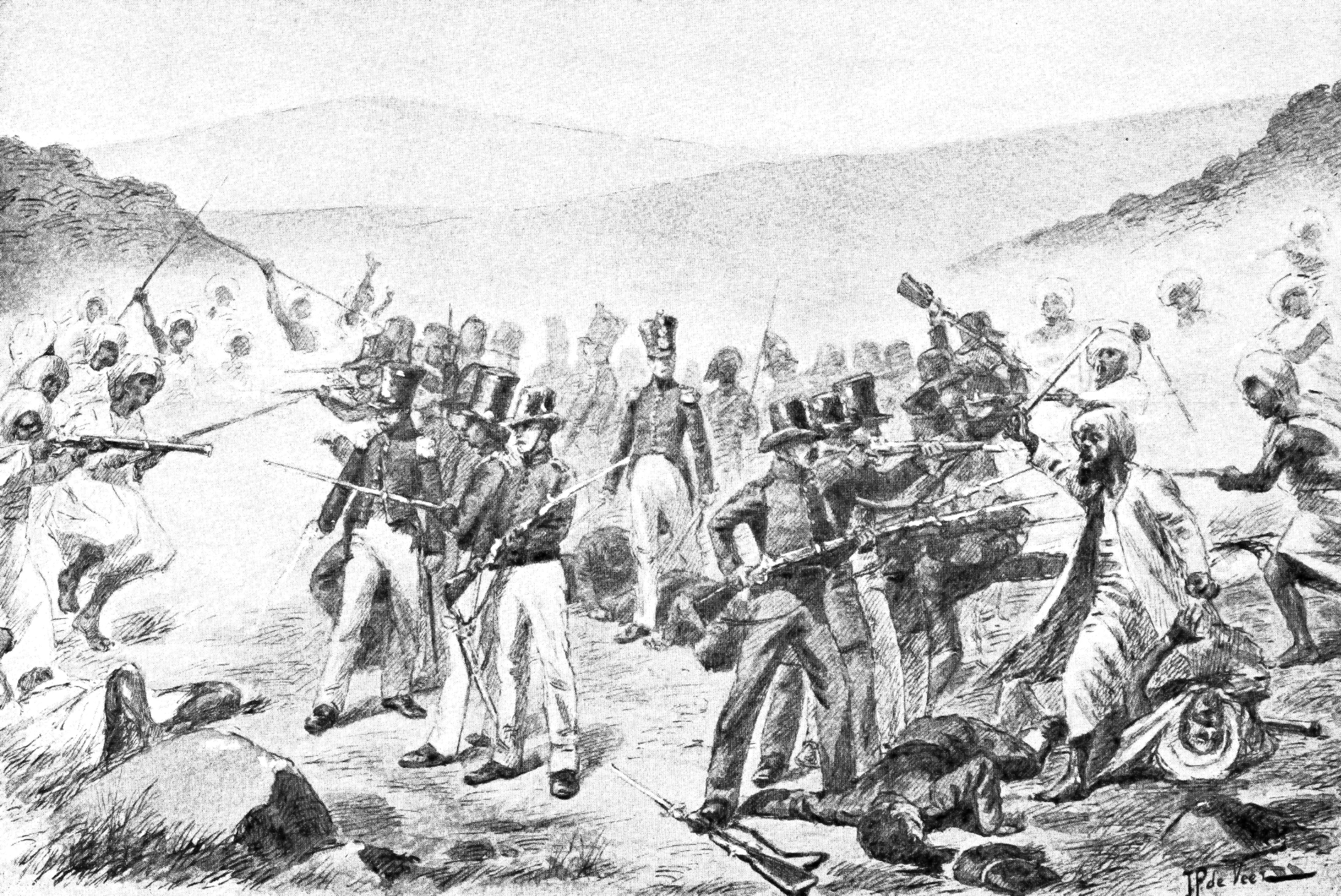
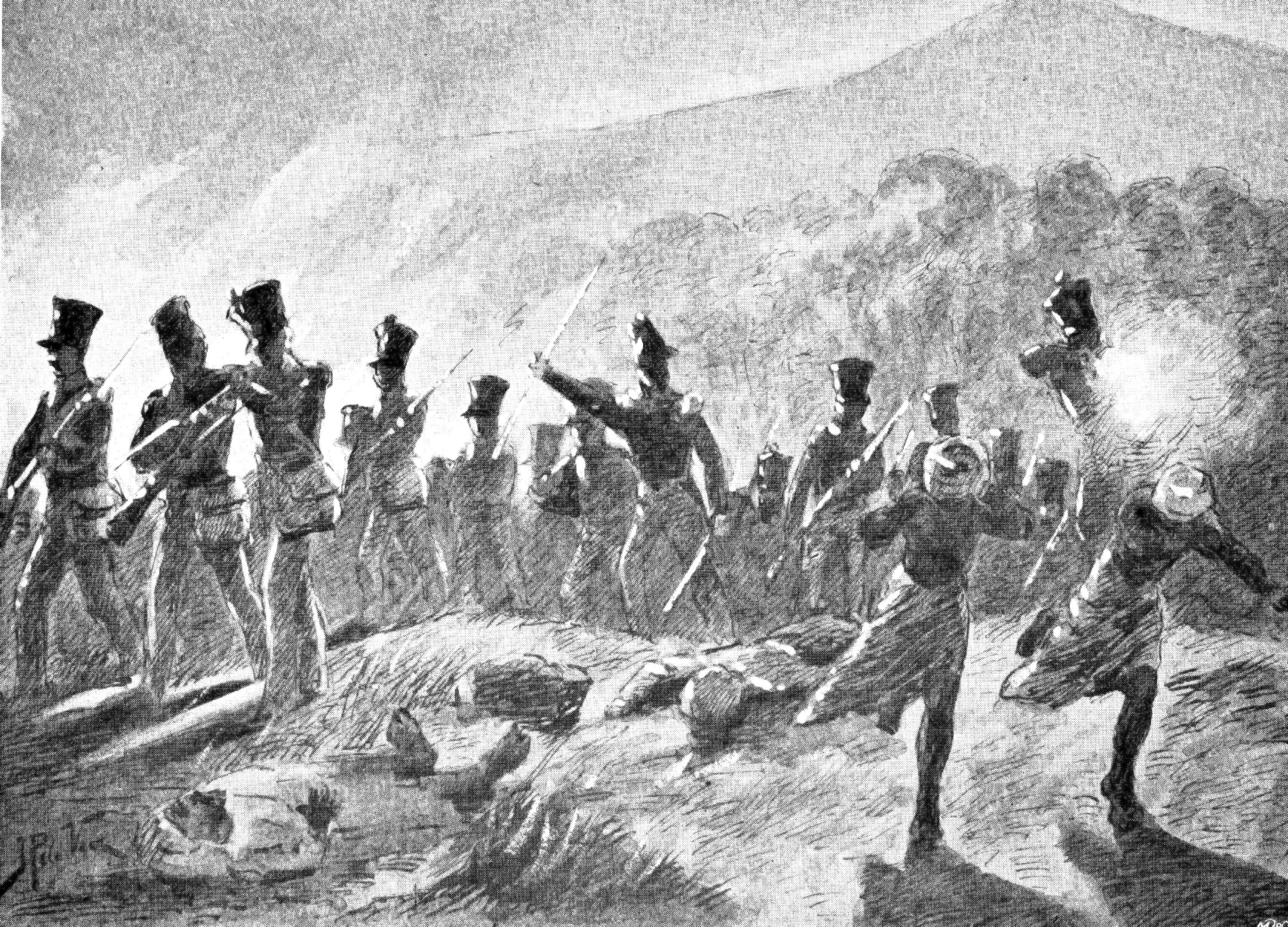
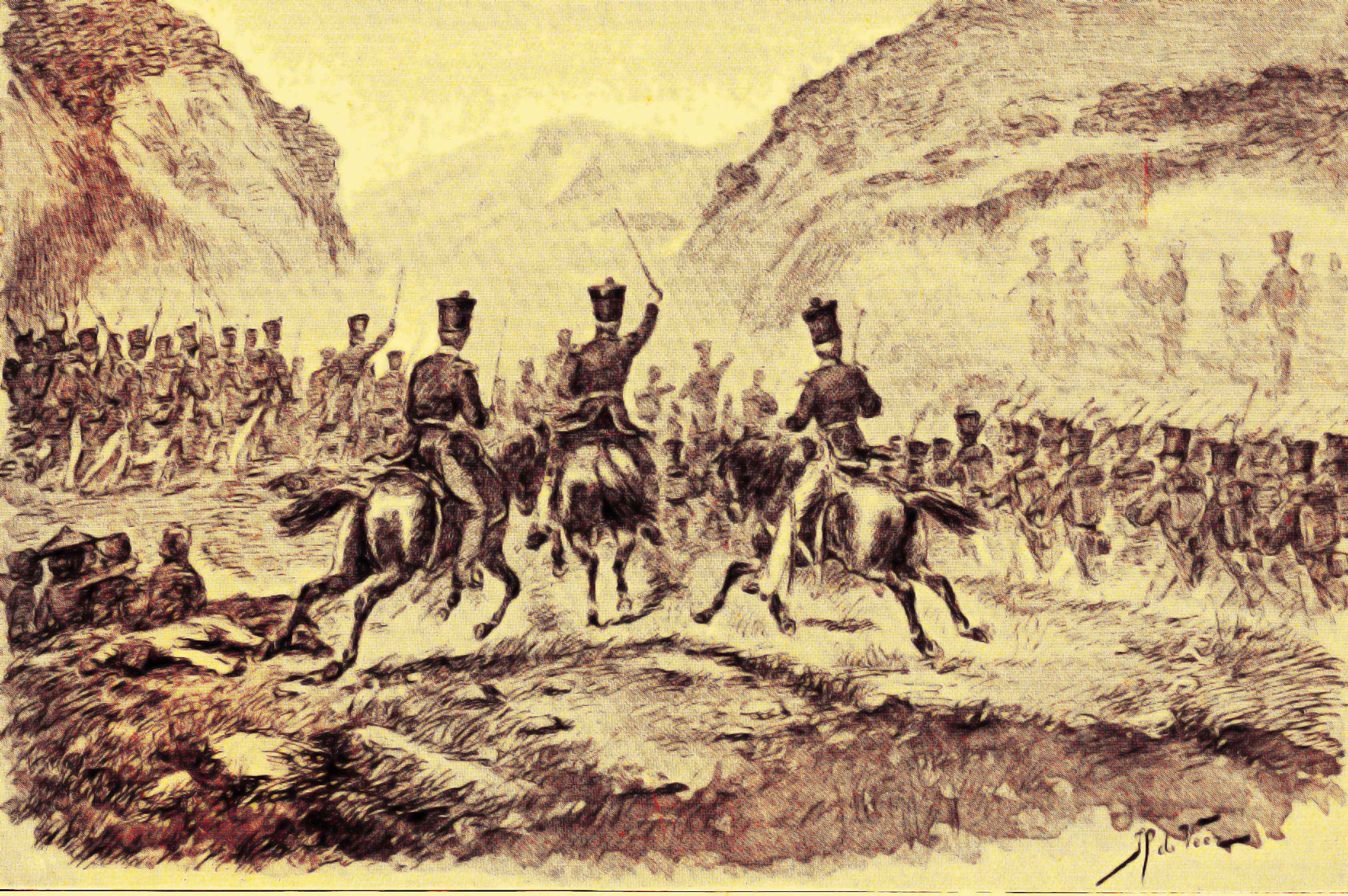
- Battle engagements between Padri and the Dutch, 1830s
Date	1803–1837
Location	West Sumatra, North Sumatra, and Riau
Result	First Padri War (1803–1825): Padri victory; Treaty of Masang; Second Padri War (1831–1837): Dutch victory; Imam Bonjol was exiled to Cianjur in West Java, then to Ambon, and later to Manado in Sulawesi

Belligerents
Adat (1803–1833); Dutch East Indies	Padri (Ulama of Minangkabau); Adat (1833–1837)

Commanders and leaders
Sultan Arifin Muningsyah; Sultan Tangkal Alam Bagagar; (exiled to Batavia in 1833); Frans Cochius; Hubert Stuers; Antoine Raaff; Pieter Elout; Ferdinand Krieger; Johan Bauer; Andreas Michiels; Frans Laemlin †; Franciscus Prager; Leonardus du Bus; Toontje Poland; Hendrik Lange	Tuanku Imam Bonjol; Tuanku Rao †; Tuanku Tambusai; Tuanku Nan Renceh; Tuanku Lintau; Tuanku Pasaman; Tuanku Nan Alahan

The Padri Wars (also called the Minangkabau War) was fought from 1803 until 1837 in West Sumatra, Indonesia between the Padri and the Adat. The Padri were Muslim clerics from Sumatra who wanted to impose Sharia in Minangkabau in West Sumatra, Indonesia. The Adat comprised the Minangkabau nobility and traditional chiefs. They asked for the help of the Dutch, who intervened in 1821 and helped the nobility defeat the Padri faction.

== Background ==
It can be considered that the Padri Wars began in 1803, before Dutch intervention, and was a conflict that had broken out in Minangkabau country when the Padri started to suppress what they saw as un-Islamic customs, i.e., the adat. But after the occupation of the Pagaruyung Kingdom by Tuanku Pasaman, one of the Padri leaders in 1815, on 21 February 1821, the Minangkabau nobility made a deal with the Dutch in Padang to help them fight the Padri.

Adat, as customary law is called in Indonesia, includes indigenous, pre-Islamic religious practices and social traditions in local customs. The Padri, like contemporaneous jihadists in the Sokoto Caliphate of West Africa, were Islamist purists who had made the hajj to Mecca and returned inspired to bring the Qur'an and sharia to a position of greater influence in Sumatra. The Padri movement had formed during the early 19th century and sought to purge the culture of traditions and beliefs its partisans viewed as un-Islamic.

In the 1820s, the Dutch had yet to consolidate their possessions in some parts of the Dutch East Indies (later Indonesia) after that were returned to them by the British after the Napoleonic Wars.. This was especially true on the island of Sumatra, where some areas would not come under Dutch rule until the 20th century.

== The Padri movement ==
From c. 1692, Islam was propagated to the Minangkabau areas of West Sumatra by Sheikh Burhanuddin Ulakan in the Shattari school of Sufism. In 1784, the Sufi ulama called Tuanku Nan Tuo was appointed as the religious head of the Koto Tuo region. He appointed a large number of his students to head various surau surrounding the region. A great number of his students were hajj returnees and were influenced by the ideals of the Wahabi movement. They called themselves Padri. The Padri movement is considered one of the major precursors of the Salafiyya movement of the 19th century; and influenced the Salafi reformist Muhammadiyyah movement of South East Asia.

The Padri upheld Sharia, the Islamic law, strictly which they would implement through violent upheaval to replace the existing Adat. Historical accounts of the Padri Wars reveal several different ideologies. The most influential were by Tuanku Nan Tuo, Tuan Ku Nan Renceh, and Imam Bonjol.

Tuanku Nan Tuo was a Shattari Sufi leader and reformist, not a Padri. He would convince villagers to rid their society of vices like cock-fighting, gambling, and opium. His methods would be through discussion, education, and also public protest. All the Padri leaders were once his students and he continuously disagreed with their extremist fanaticism and militant violence. In revenge for this insolence, the Padri attacked and burnt down numerous villages which were Shattari centers; instigated mass murder of the ulama and rang cerdek (intelligentsia) as well as rape and plunder. The Padri waged war against Nan Tuo's village of Koto Tuo from 1815. Nan Tuo's sons died in battle. Koto Tuo held on until the Dutch arrived in 1821.

Tuanku Nan Renceh with Tuanku Lintau and Tuanku Pasaman were at war with the Adat and would forbid cock-fighting, gambling, and sireh; and forced women to cover up. Any that disagreed with their interpretation of Islam were punishable by death. They grew wealthy by enslaving the population to grow coffee and other agriculture. While forcing residents to wear white and grow beards, they would wear red.

Imam Bonjol was a mystic, strategist, and visionary. Imam Bonjol with Tuanku Rao and Tuanku Tambusai were based in the northern areas where the Padri Wars evolved differently. Many in the north were early Padri sympathisers. While they were as militant and extremist as Nan Renceh initially, their roles were quite different. While Nan Renceh was punishing the Adat population, Imam Bonjol and Rao were developing trading routes and fortresses against the Dutch. He also enslaved the Batak people. In January 1824, he signed a peace treaty with the Dutch but a new commander arrived and dishonoured it. In 1831, Imam Bonjol attacked a Dutch garrison killing off 2 thirds of the soldiers. Later, as Imam Bonjol met numerous Hajj returnees who contested the Padri and Wahabbi extremism, he began to have misgivings, doubts, and regrets. By September 1832, Imam Bonjol was disillusioned and, perhaps seeking repentance, he walked out of his village fort and left the Padri.

== First Padri War 1803–1825 ==
=== Beginning 1803–1821 ===
Upon the return of three alim ulama from Mecca around 1803, namely Haji Miskin, Haji Sumanik and Haji Piobang, they expressed their wish to perfecting the application of Islamic law in Minangkabau society. Knowing this, Tuanku Nan Renceh was very interested and supported the wishes of the three scholars. Together with other scholars, these eight figures are known as Harimau Nan Salapan (Tigers of Eight).

Harimau Nan Salapan then asked Tuanku Lintau who has closeness and kinship with Yang Dipertuan Pagaruyung Sultan Arifin Muningsyah to invite the Indigenous People to abandon several habits that are contrary to the teachings Islam. In several negotiations there was no agreement between the Padri and the Indigenous People. This conflict led to turmoil among several nagari in the Pagaruyung Kingdom, until in 1815, the Padri under the leadership of Tuanku Lintau attacked the Pagaruyung Kingdom and war broke out in Koto Tangah. This attack caused Sultan Arifin Muningsyah to be forced to step aside and flee the royal capital. Notes of Thomas Stamford Raffles who visited Pagaruyung in 1818, stated that he only found the remains of Pagaruyung Royal Palace which was burned down. As part of the Dutch aid agreement, the Indigenous People surrendered the areas of Simawang and Sulit Air, by order of resident James du Puy in Padang. Then on 8 December 1821 additional troops arrived led by Lieutenant Colonel Raaff to strengthen the position in the area that had been controlled.

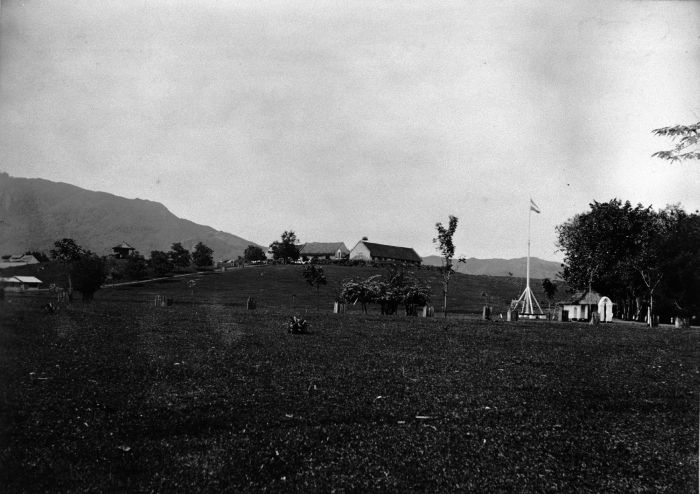
Fort van der Capellen

On 4 March 1822, Dutch troops under the command of Lieutenant Colonel Raaff succeeded in pushing the Padri people out of Pagaruyung. Then the Dutch built a defensive fort in Batusangkar with the name Fort Van der Capellen, while the Padri gathered strength and defended themselves in Lintau.

=== Battle of Baso (1822) ===
On 14 August 1822, Padri Ulama forces faced battle with Dutch forces, the Padri Ulama succeeded in defeating the Dutch and their commander was wounded in action.

=== Battle of Batusangkar (1822) ===
The battle occurred in 1822 in Batusangkar, where the Padri raided the Dutch. The Dutch suffered heavy casualties including the destruction of the Dutch unit, and their commander was killed in action.

=== Battle of Lintau (1823) ===
After the Dutch obtained support, they attacked Lintau but the Padri Ulama forces successfully defended, defeating the Dutch forces, causing them to withdraw to Batusangkar.

=== Battle of Bukittinggi (1825) ===
Padri troops carried out a well-planned frontal attack, surprising the Dutch troops, who were not fully prepared for a large-scale attack. This attack inflicted heavy losses on the Dutch.

=== Battle of Sulit Air (1825) ===
The Battle of Sulit Air was also one of the Padri's victories, where they succeeded in expelling the Dutch troops from the area and also sacked the Dutch headquarters.

== Treaty of Masang ==
Dutch involvement in the war came about because it was invited by the Adat faction, and in April 1821, Dutch troops attacked Simawang and Sulit Air under captains Goffinet and Dienema on the orders of James du Puy, the Dutch Resident in Padang. Between 1821 and 1824, skirmishes broke out throughout the region, ended only by the Treaty of Masang. The war cooled down during the next six years, as the Dutch faced larger-scale uprisings in Java.

== Second Padri War 1831–1838 ==
=== The fall of Luhak Nan Tigo 1831–1833 ===
After the end of the Diponegoro War and the restoration of Dutch East Indies power in Java, the Dutch East Indies government again tried to subdue the Padri. This is very much based on a strong desire to control coffee cultivation which is expanding in the interior of Minangkabau (the Darek region). Until the 19th century, coffee was one of the mainstay products of the Dutch in Europe. Christine Dobbin calls it more of a trade war, this is in line with the dynamics of social change in Minangkabau society in the twists and turns of trade in the interior and on the west coast or east coast. Meanwhile, on the one hand, the Dutch wanted to take over or have a monopoly.

Furthermore, to weaken the opposing forces, the Dutch violated the ceasefire agreement by attacking the nagari Pandai Sikek which was one of the areas capable of producing gunpowder and firearms. Then to strengthen its position, the Dutch built a fort in Bukittinggi which was known as Fort de Kock. At the beginning of August 1831, Lintau was successfully conquered and put Luhak Tanah Datar under Dutch control. However, Tuanku Lintau still continued to fight from the Luhak Limo Puluah area.

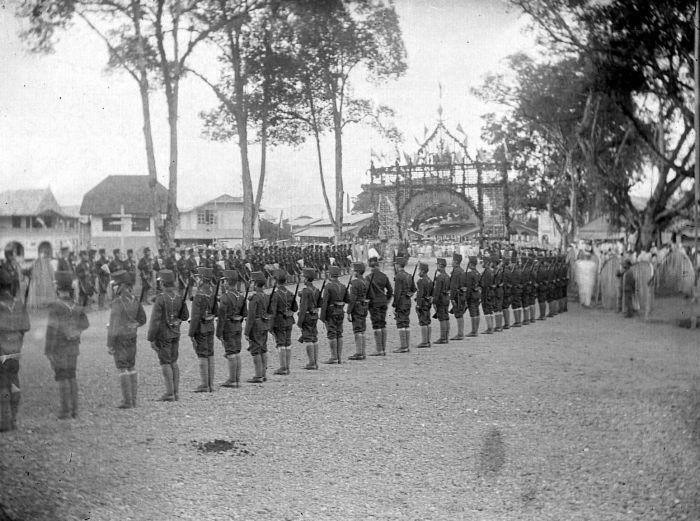
Preparations of Dutch troops at Fort de Kock

Meanwhile, when Lieutenant Colonel Elout carried out various attacks against The Padri between 1831 and 1832, he obtained additional strength from the troops of Sentot Prawirodirdjo, one of the commanders of Prince Diponegoro who had defected and served in the Dutch East Indies government after the war in Java ended. However, then Lieutenant Colonel Elout argued that the presence of Sentot who was stationed in Lintau actually created new problems. Several official Dutch documents prove that Sentot was guilty of conspiring with the Padri so that Sentot and his legions were then returned to Java. In Java, Sentot also failed to dispel Dutch suspicions about him and sent him back to Sumatra. Sentot was exiled and detained in Bengkulu, while his troops were disbanded and then recruited back into the Dutch army.

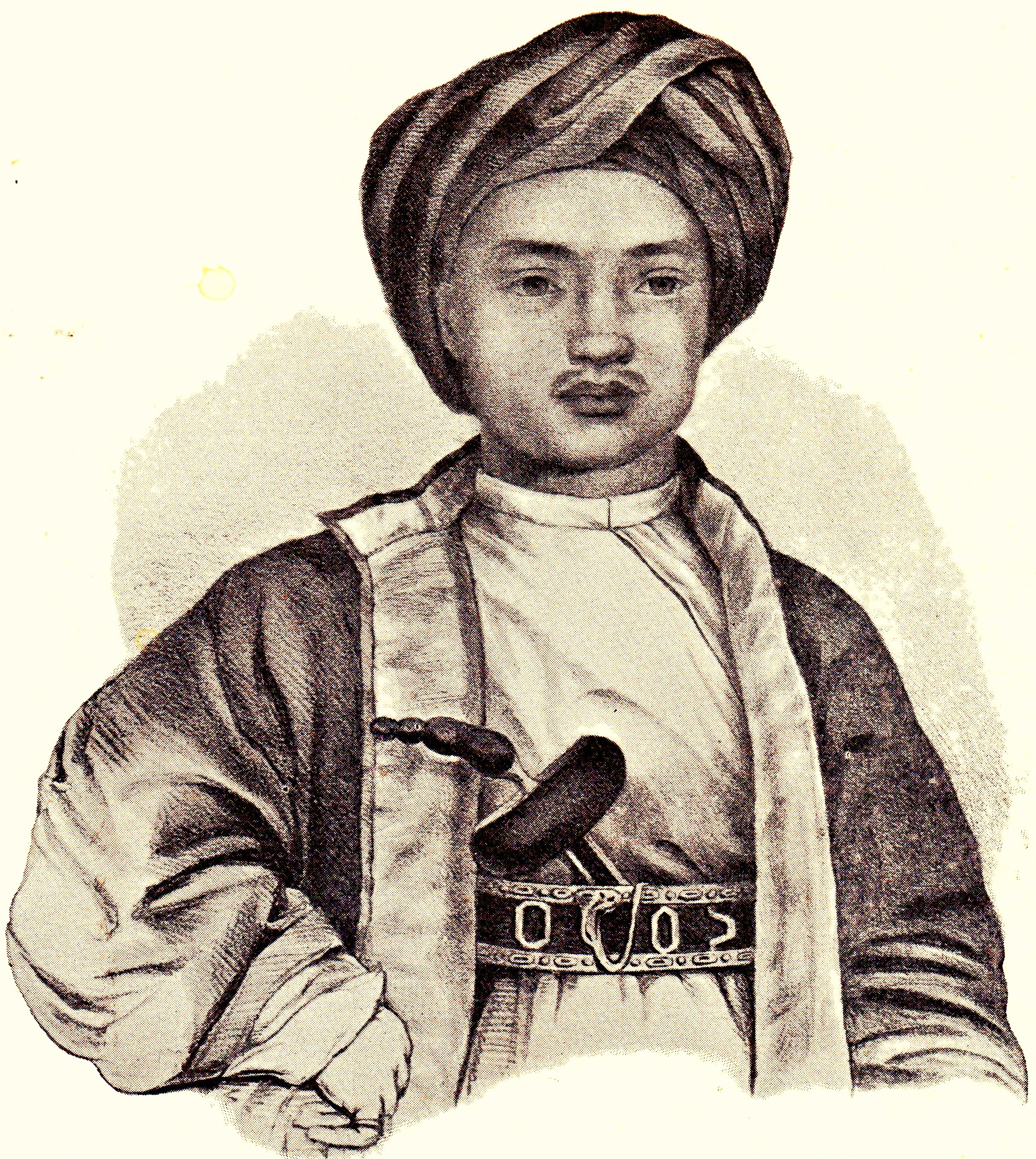
Sentot Prawirodirdjo, illustrated by Justus Pieter de Veer.

In July 1832, from Batavia a large infantry force was sent under the leadership of Lieutenant Colonel Ferdinand P. Vermeulen Krieger, to speed up the completion of the war. In October 1832, Luhak Limo Puluah was under Dutch rule at the same time as Tuanku Lintau died. Then The Padri continued to consolidate and entrench themselves in Kamang, but the entire strength of the Padri in Luhak Agam also was conquered by the Dutch after the fall of Kamang Magek, Agam Kamang at the end of 1832, so that the Padri were again forced to withdraw from Luak Luhak area and defend themselves in Bonjol.

=== Consolidation of indigenous peoples and Padri 1833 ===
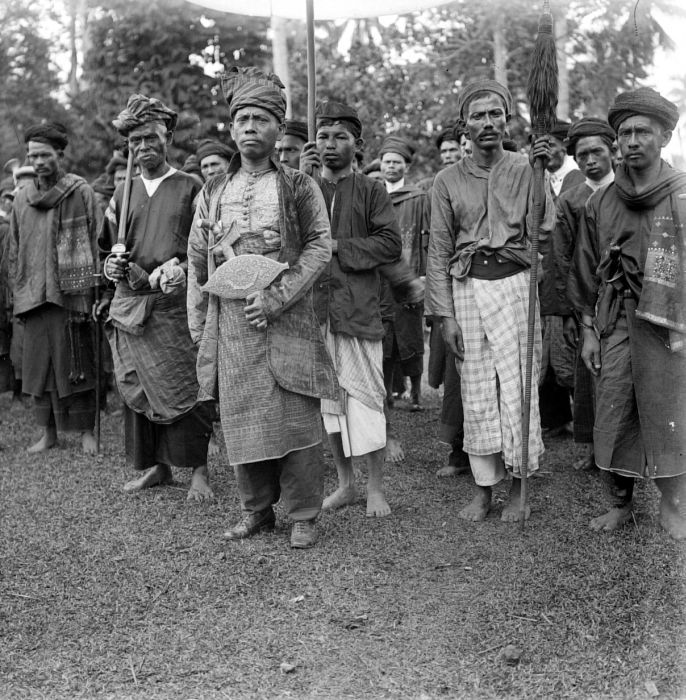
Indigenous People

Since 1833 a compromise began to emerge between Indigenous People and Padri People. On 11 January 1833, several strongholds of the Dutch garrison were suddenly attacked, making the situation chaotic; mentioned there were around 139 European soldiers and hundreds of native soldiers were killed. Sultan nggul Alam Bagagar who was previously appointed by the Dutch as Regent of Tanah Datar, was captured by the troops of Lieutenant Colonel Elout on 2 May 1833 in Batusangkar on charges of treason and exiled to Batavia. In Dutch records Sultan nggul Alam Bagagar denied his involvement in the attack on several Dutch posts, but the Dutch Indies government also did not want to take the risk of rejecting the reports from its officers. The position of Regent of Tanah Datar was then given to Tuan Gadang in Batipuh. Then the Dutch troops began conducting searches in several areas which were still the base of the Padri tribe. In January 1833, Dutch troops built a fortification in Padang Matinggi, but before they could strengthen their position, the fortification was attacked by the Padri under the leadership of Tuanku Rao which resulted in many Dutch casualties. However, in the battle at Air Bangis, on 29 January 1833, Tuanku Rao suffered serious injuries as a result of being hit by bullets. Then he was put on board the ship for exile. Not long after he was on the ship, Tuanku Rao met his death. It is suspected that his body was then thrown into the sea by Dutch soldiers. Realizing this, now the Dutch are not only facing the Padri but the entire Minangkabau community. So the Dutch East Indies Government in 1833 issued an announcement called "Long Plaque" containing a statement that the arrival of the Dutch to Minangkabau did not intend to control the country, they only came to trade and maintain security, the Minangkabau population would continue to be ruled by the Dutch East Indies, their chief and are not required to pay tax. Then the Dutch argued that to maintain security, build roads, open schools, and so on required money, so the people were obliged to grow coffee and had to sell it to the Dutch.

=== Attack on Fort Amerongen ===
In January 1833, the forces led by Tuanku Tambusai launched the storming attacks on Dutch fort in Sepisang, Bonjol. In the battles the Dutch forces did not expect the surprise attack by Padri forces, the Padri forces effectively attacked the fort and inflicted heavy losses to Dutch sides and killed 11 Dutch troops, and 24 other Dutch troops were wounded.

=== Attack on Bonjol 1833–1835 ===
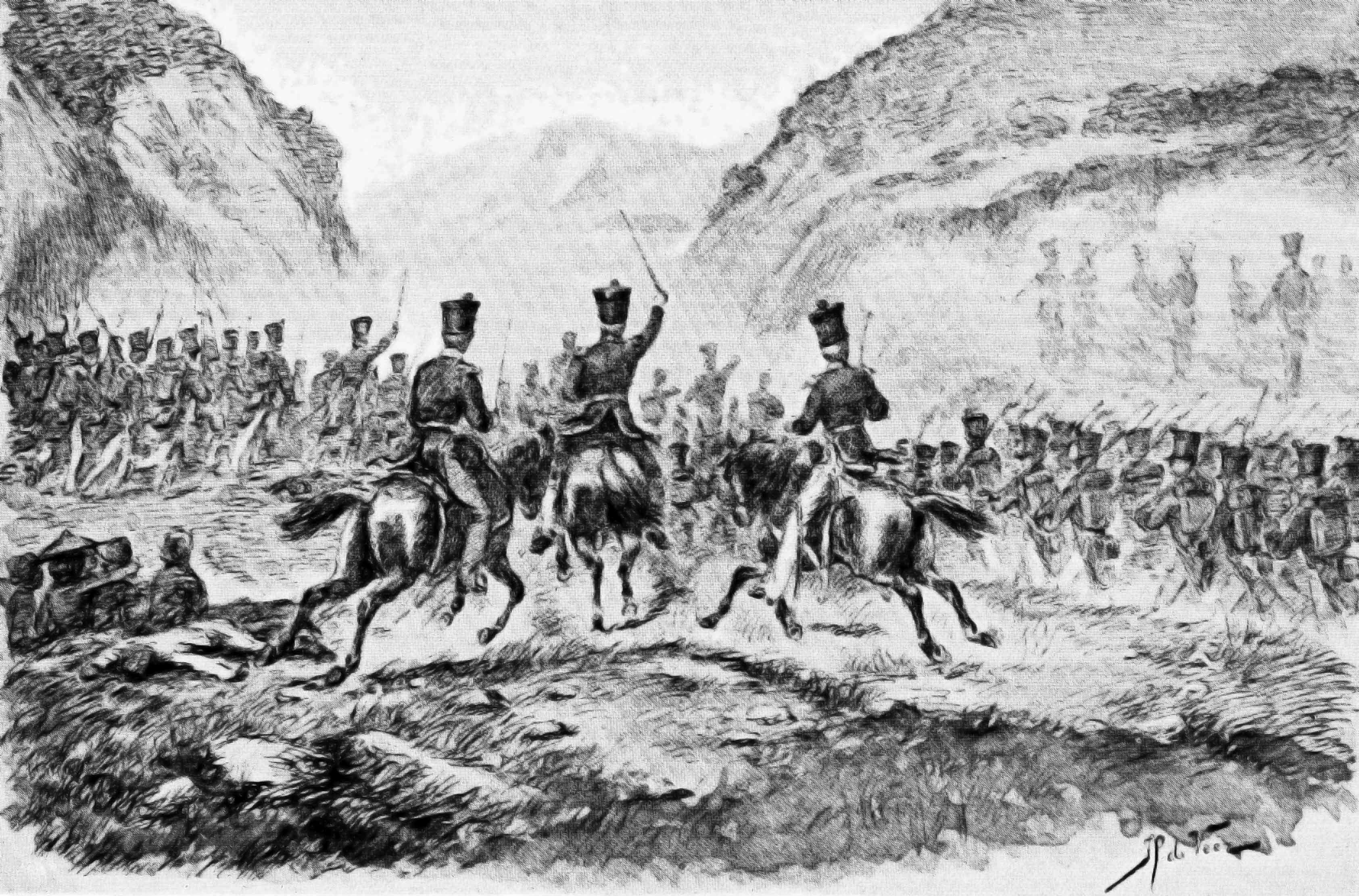
Lieutenant Colonel Raaff and his troops, depicted by Justus Pieter de Veer. Raaff died before the end of the Padri Wars.

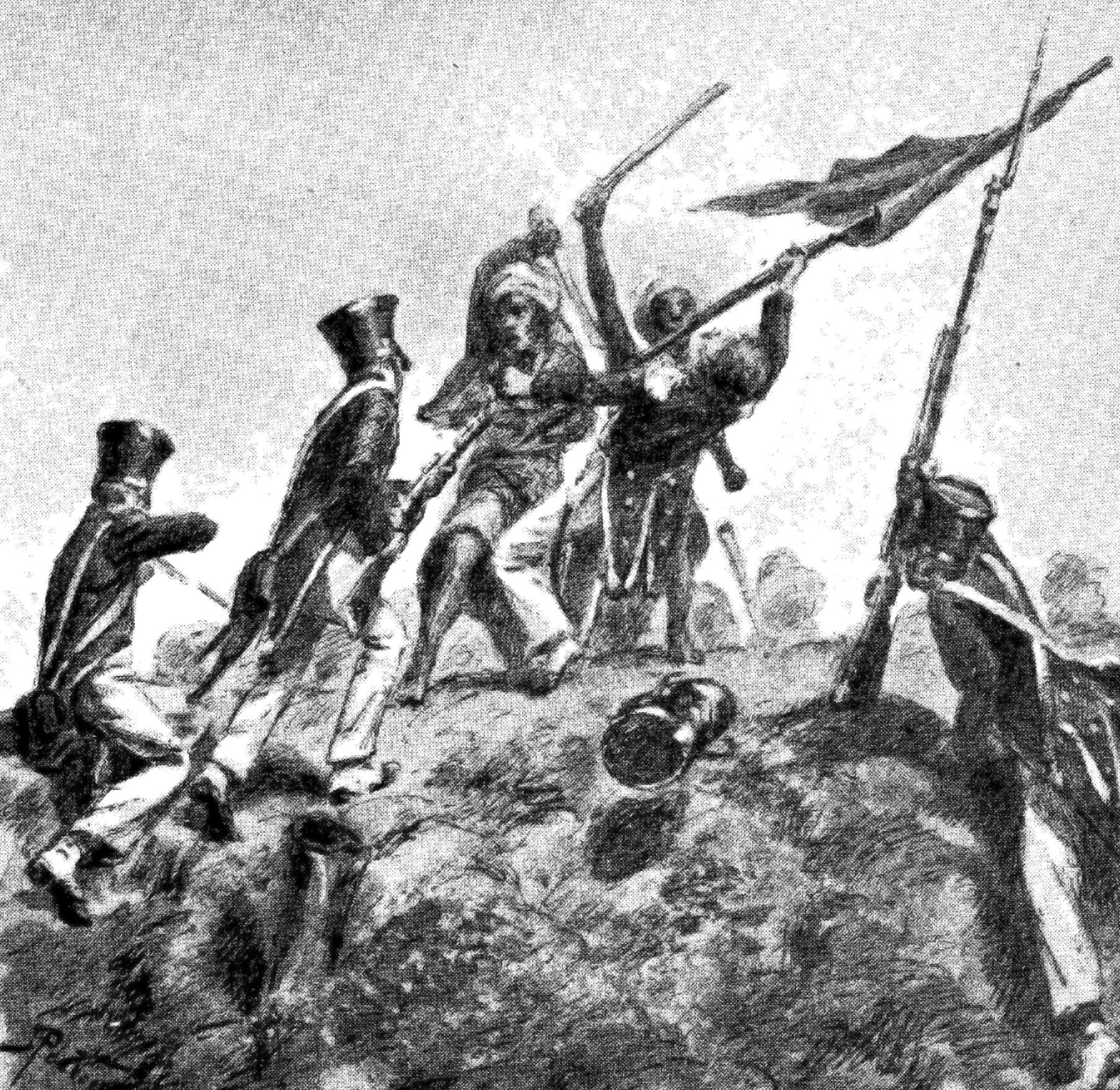
Romanticism of heroism in the Padri Wars, illustrated by Justus Pieter de Veer.

This war took a long time to complete, forcing Governor General of the Dutch East Indies Johannes van den Bosch on 23 August 1833 to go to Padang to see up close the process of military operations carried out by Dutch troops . Arriving in Padang, he held negotiations with Commissioner Pesisir Barat Sumatra, Major General Riesz and Lieutenant Colonel Elout to immediately conquer Fort Bonjol, the command center of the Padri troops. Riesz and Elout explained that the right time had not yet come to carry out a general attack on Fort Bonjol, because of the loyalty of the people of Luhak Agam is still doubtful and it is very possible that they will attack the Dutch troops from behind. But van den Bosch insisted on immediately conquering Fort Bonjol no later than 10 September 1833, the two officers asked for a six-day delay so that the fall of Bonjol was expected on 16 September 1833. Even though the movement of Dutch troops towards Bonjol was still very slow, it took almost a month to approach the area Alahan Panjang Valley. As the leading front of Alahan Panjang is the area Padang Lawas which is still fully controlled by The Padri. However, on 8 June 1835, Dutch troops succeeded in controlling this area. The very dense bushes and forests around Bonjol made it difficult for the Dutch troops to see the Padri strongholds. This situation was put to good use by the Padri to build a strategic stronghold, as well as being the main headquarters of Tuanku Imam Bonjol. The tactics of guerilla attacks applied by The Padri succeeded in slowing down the Dutch attack on Fort Bonjol, even in several resistances almost all of the Dutch troops' war equipment such as cannons and their supplies were able to recover. confiscated. Dutch troops could only carry weapons and clothing attached to their hands and bodies. So on 21 September 1833, before the Governor General of the Dutch East Indies was replaced by Jean Chrétien Baud, van den Bosch made a report that the attack on Bonjol had failed and efforts were being made to consolidate for the next attack.

During 1834, the Dutch focused on building roads and bridges leading to Bonjol, Pasaman|Bonjol by mobilizing thousands of forced laborers. This was done to facilitate the mobility of his troops in conquering Bonjol. Apart from that, the Dutch also continued to try to exert influence in several areas close to their strongholds. Then, on 11 June 1835, the Dutch troops moved again to the east of Batang Alahan Panjang and built a fortification there, while the Padri troops remained on standby on the other side. Dutch troops managed to approach Bonjol, Pasaman|Bonjol] within a distance of approximately only 250 steps at midnight on 16 June 1835, then they tried to build a fortification. Next, using howitzers, mortars and cannons, the Dutch troops fired at Fort Bonjol. However, the Padri did not remain silent by firing cannons from Tajadi Hill. So with a less favorable position, the Dutch troops suffered many casualties.

=== Fort Bonjol ===
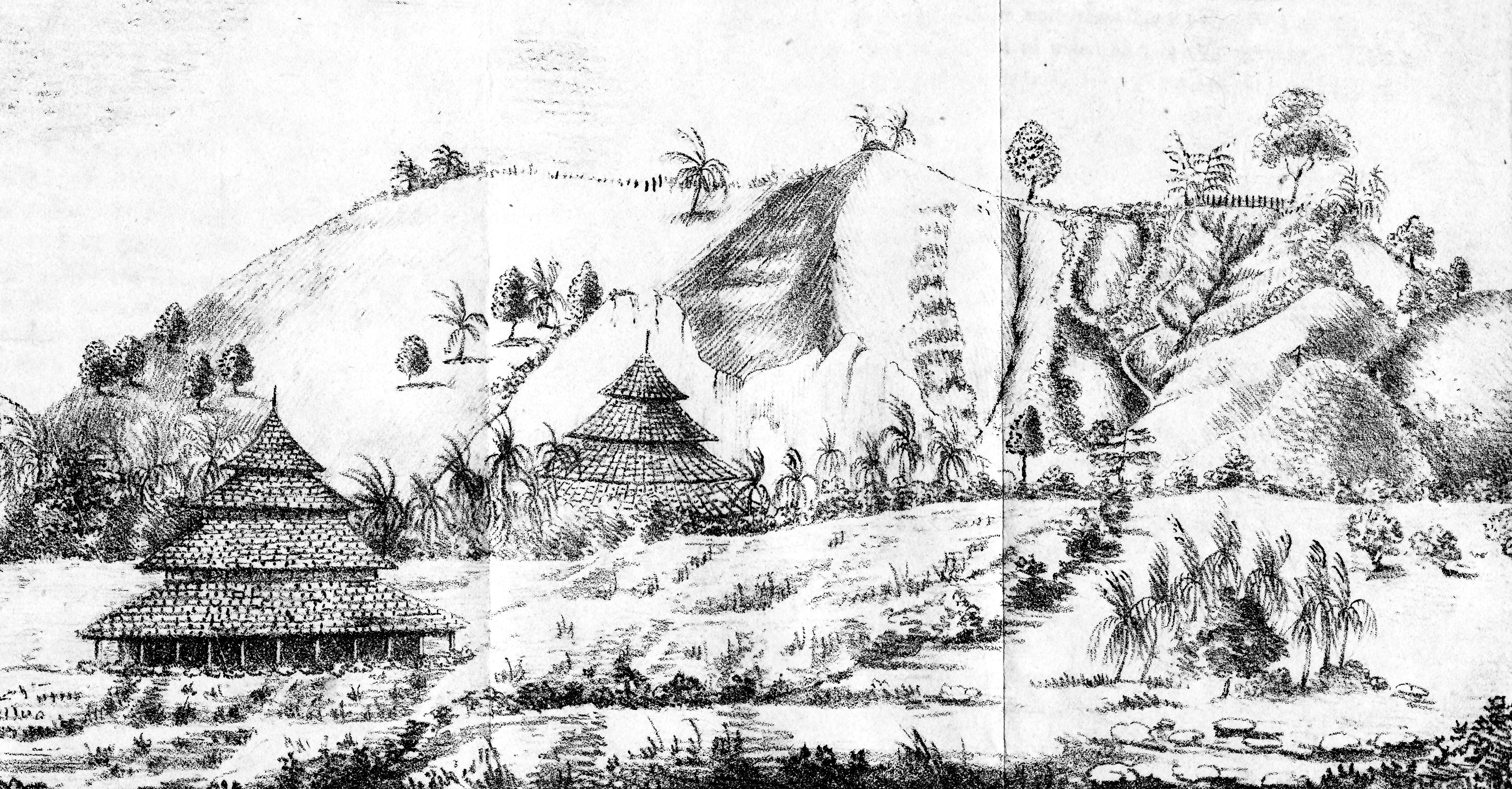
Painting of Bonjol in 1839.

Fort Bonjol is located on a hill which is almost straight up, known as Bukit Tajadi. Not so far from this fort flows Batang Alahan Panjang, a river in the middle of the valley with a fast flow, winding from north to south. This fort is shaped like a long rectangle, surrounded on three sides by two layers of defensive walls approximately 3 meters high. Between the two layers of wall a deep trench was made with a width of 4 meters. The outer wall consists of large stones with almost the same construction technique as fortresses in Europe and on top of it is planted bamboo with long thorns which are planted very close together so that the Padri can observed and even fired cannons at the Dutch troops. The very dense bushes and forests around Bonjol made it difficult for the Dutch troops to see the Padri strongholds. This situation was put to good use by the Padri to build a strategic stronghold, as well as being the main headquarters of Tuanku Imam Bonjol.

=== Siege of Bonjol 1835–1837 ===
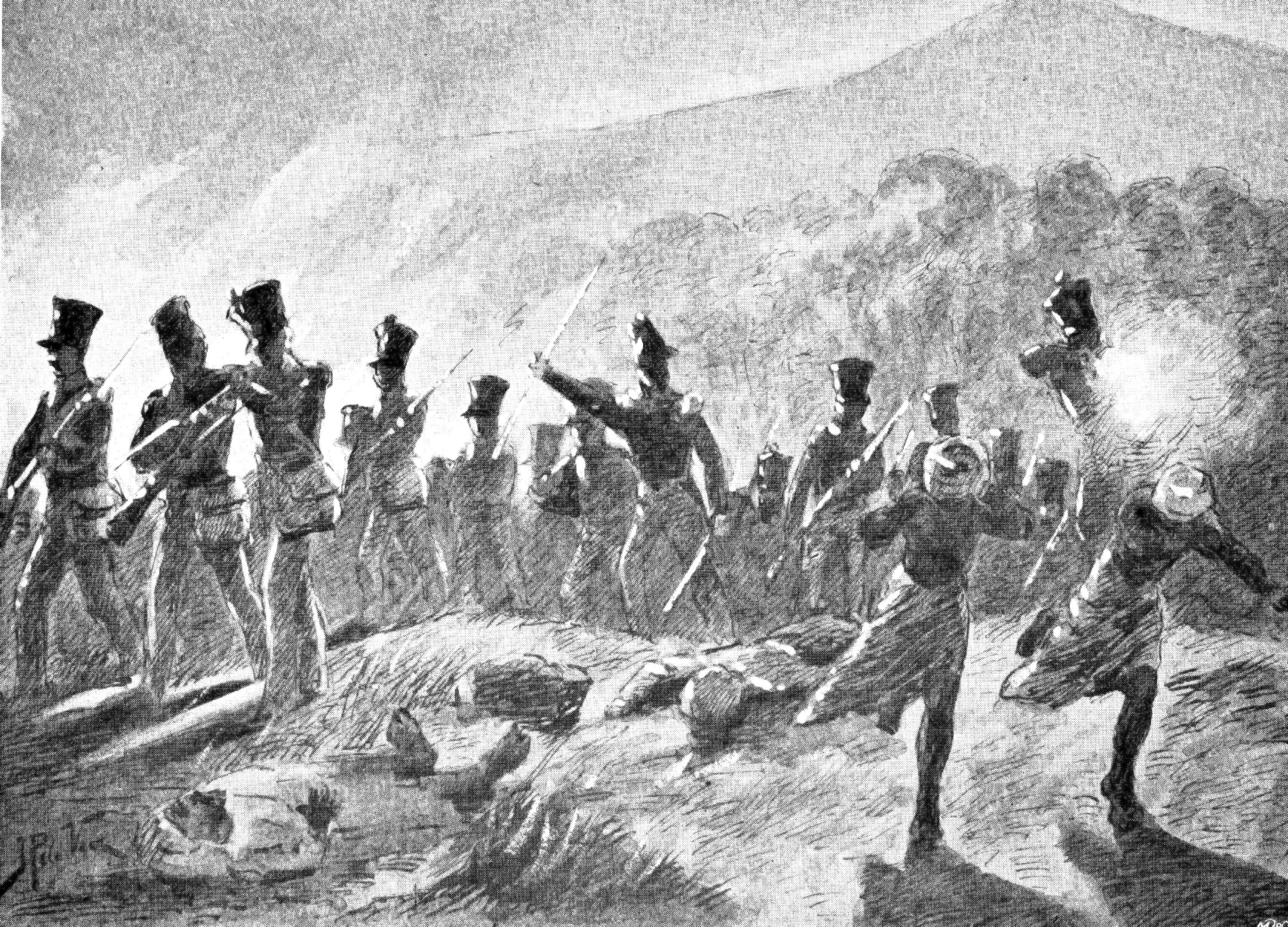
The Fall of Tajadi Hill, illustrated by Justus Pieter de Veer.

Seeing the strength of Fort Bonjol, the Dutch troops tried to carry out a blockade against Bonjol with the aim of paralyzing the supply of food and weapons for the Padri troops. This blockade turned out to be ineffective, because it was the Dutch troops' strongholds and supplies that were attacked by Padri troops in a guerilla manner. At the same time, all Padri troops began to arrive from areas that had been conquered by Dutch troops, namely from various countries in Minangkabau and surrounding areas. Everyone is determined to defend the Bonjol headquarters until the last drop of blood, live a noble life or die martyrdom. Efforts to carry out an offensive attack on Bonjol were only made again after army reinforcements consisting of Bugis troops arrived, so in mid-August 1835 attacks began to be carried out against the Padri strongholds in Fort Fort. Bukit Tajadi, and these Bugis troops were at the front of the Dutch troops in capturing one by one the strategic strongholds of the Padri people around Bukit Tajadi. However, until early September 1835, the Dutch troops had not succeeded in controlling Mount Tajadi, instead on 5 September 1835, The Padri came out of their strongholds and stormed outside the fort destroying the Dutch fortifications built around Mount Tajadi. After the attack, the Padri troops immediately returned to Bonjol Fort. On 9 September 1835, Dutch troops tried to attack from the direction of Luhak Limo Puluah and Padang Bubus, but the results failed, even causing many losses to the Dutch troops. Lieutenant Colonel Bauer, one of the commanders of the Dutch troops, suffered from illness and was forced to be sent to Bukittinggi and then his position was replaced by Major Prager. The protracted blockade and the courage of the Padri, aroused the courage of the surrounding people to rebel and attack the Dutch troops, so that on 11 December 1835, the people of Simpang and Alahan Mati took up arms and attacked the strongholds. Dutch defense.

The Dutch troops were unable to overcome this resistance. However, after assistance arrived from Madura soldiers who served in the Dutch troops, this resistance was overcome.

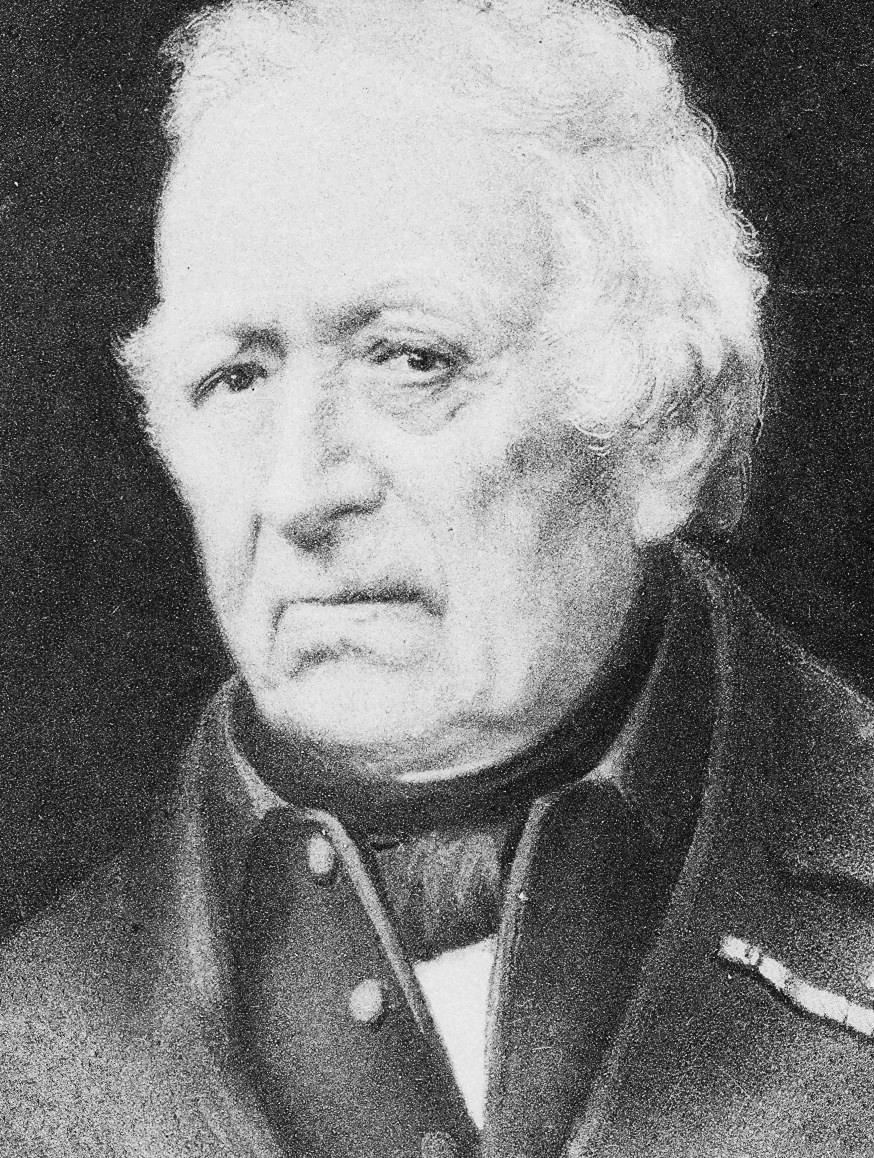
Frans David Cochius, commander conquest of Fort Bonjol.

Almost a year after besieging Bonjol, on 3 December 1836, Dutch troops again carried out a large-scale attack on Fort Bonjol, as a final attempt to conquer Bonjol. This powerful attack was able to breach part of Fort Bonjol, so that Dutch troops could invade and succeed in killing several families of Tuanku Imam Bonjol. However, with tenacity and high fighting spirit, the Padri again managed to ravage the enemy so that the Dutch were expelled and forced to leave the fort again, leaving behind many casualties on each side.

The failure of this conquest really hit the policy of the Governor General of the Dutch East Indies in Batavia which at that time had been held by Dominique Jacques de Eerens, then at the beginning of 1837 he sent a warlord named Major General Cochius to directly lead a massive attack on Fort Bonjol for the umpteenth time. Cochius was a high-ranking Dutch officer who had expertise in the war strategy of Fort Stelsel. Next, the Dutch intensively surrounded Bonjol from all directions for about six months (16 March–17 August 1837) led by a general and several officers. This joint army mostly consisted of various tribes, such as Java, Madura, Bugis and Ambon. There were 148 officers European, 36 officers indigenous, 1,103 soldiers European, 4,130 soldiers indigenous, including Sumenapsche hulptroepen hieronder begrepen (auxiliary troops of Sumenap aka Madura). In the list of names of Dutch troop officers include Majjen Cochius, Lieutenant Colonel Bauer, Major Sous, Major Prager, Captain MacLean, Lieutenant van der Tak, Peltu Steinmetz, etc. Then there are also "Inlandsche" (indigenous) names such as Kapitein Noto Prawiro, Indlandsche Lieutenant Prawiro di Logo, Karto Wongso Wiro Redjo, Prawiro Sentiko, Prawiro Brotto, Merto Poero and others. From Batavia, additional Dutch troops were imported, who arrived on 20 July 1837 on the Perle Ship in Padang, a number of Europeans and Sepoys, soldiers from Africa who served in the Dutch army, recruited from Ghana and Mali, consisting of 1 sergeant, 4 corporaals and 112 flankeurs, and led by Kapitein Sinninghe. Waves and continuous attacks and rain of bullets from artillery troops armed with large cannons, for approximately 6 months, as well as infantry and cavalry troops who continued to arrive. On 3 August 1837, led by Lieutenant Colonel Michiels as the foremost field commander, he began to control the situation little by little, and finally on 15 August 1837, Tajadi Hill fell, and on 16 August 1837, Fort Bonjol was completely conquered. However, Tuanku Imam Bonjol was able to withdraw from the fort accompanied by several of his followers and continued towards the Marapak area.

== Impact ==
With the victory, the Dutch tightened their hold on West Sumatra. Yet, the traditional and religious leaders increasingly reconciled their visions after the war. This helped promulgating the new view of "adat basandi syara', syara' basandi Kitabullah" ("tradition founded upon Islamic law, Islamic law founded upon the Qur'an").

== See also ==
- Ruit van Bonjol
- Tuanku Imam Bonjol, leader in the Padri movement
