= Suhendri =

Indonesian police general (born 1971)

- Born: August 17, 1971 (age 55); Padang Panjang, West Sumatra, Indonesia
- Education: Indonesian Police Academy ? (S.H.); College of Police Sciences (S.IK.); Airlangga University (M.PSDM.)
- Spouse: Dhenty Marthania (m. 2007)
- Children: 4
- Military career
- Allegiance: Indonesia
- Branch: Police
- Service years: 1993 – now
- Rank: Inspector general
- Service number: 71080347
- Unit: Mobile Brigade
- Commands: Riau Islands Provincial Police; Student and Cadet Development Corps, Police Academy; Bali Police Mobile Brigade Unit; Jambi Police Mobile Brigade Unit; Riau Islands Police Mobile Brigade Unit; C Detachment, Pioneer Unit, Mobile Brigade Corps

Suhendri (born 17 August 1971) is an Indonesian police general currently serving as the police chief of the Riau Islands province. Suhendri was notable for commanding two major national ceremonies, the 2014 flag lowering ceremony in the presidential palace and the 2026 police anniversary ceremony in the mobile brigade corps training ground.

== Early life, education, and personal life ==
Suhendri was born on 17 August 1971 in Padang Panjang as the third of five children born to Sarjim and Nurlis. He grew up with his family in Pitalah, a nagari within the Tanah Datar regency. He completed his primary education at the 13th Padang Panjang Elementary School in 1984, before continuing his secondary education at the 2nd Padang Panjang Middle School in 1987 and Padang Panjang State High School in 1990. Suhendri practiced karate and represented his province, West Sumatra, as an athlete in provincial competitions.

Suhendri was admitted into the police academy on the same year after graduating high school, becoming the only member of his family to not work in the private sector. He later remarked that he had no idea of the corps that he wants to be in after being admitted. He graduated from the academy in 1993 as a police second lieutenant (equivalent to the current rank of second inspector) and underwent specialized training for Sabhara (public order) unit the next year. Suhendri has a bachelor's degree in law, obtained in 2001, and another on police sciences from the Police Sciences College in 2003. He received his master's degree in human resources development from the Airlangga University in 2024. Throughout his career, Suhendri had undergone police trainings overseas in Japan, Thailand, and Italy.

Suhendri is married to Dhenty Marthania, whom he met as a middle school student in Surabaya while he was in an internship for his final year in the police academy. He met Dhenty again, who was then in college, during his second deployment in East Java in 1999 and proposed to her after six months. The couple was married in 2007 and has three daughters and a son.

== Police career ==
Suhendri began his career as a platoon commander in the mobile brigade unit of the East Java police, effective 1 October 1993. He was reassigned to the police academy as a cadet platoon commander on 1 October 1995 and was promoted to police first lieutenant (currently police inspector) the year after. On the first year of 1998 Suhendri was promoted to cadet company commander, with his rank being increased to police captain (currently adjunct police commissioner) a year later. During his tenure in the academy, Suhendri completed advanced training on corruption as a criminal offence in 1997. He was deployed to East Timor in 1995, where he recalled the local populace being resistant to military and police personnel, and attempted to suppress revolts by fraternizing with them.

Suhendri returned to the mobile brigade unit of the East Java police on 1 May 1999, becoming the commandant of the 3/A company within the unit. During his tenure, protest broke out in Surabaya in opposition of President Abdurrahman Wahid's impeachment, with regional offices of parties supporting his impeachment being torched by the protesters. Suhendri, whose company was guarding the Golkar party office—the only one remaining—ignored orders to remain in the building for fear of casualties. The building was eventually burned down by the protesting mass, and Suhendri was blamed for negligence by his superior and government officials. Suhendri later stated that it was "the bravest decision he ever made".

Suhendri was rotated to the Gresik regency police on 3 September 2003 as its chief of operations. He was promoted to the rank of police commissioner in 2004, and on 3 March 2006 became the deputy chief of the Gresik police. In the course of his service in East Java, Suhendri completed a course on mobile brigade unit in 2000, on English language in 2001, and a comparative study overseas in 2005. Suhendri was deployed to Aceh to take part in the disaster recovery process following the earthquake and tsunami that decimated the province.

Suhendri was discharged from his leadership of the Gresik police and returned to the East Java police as a non-service policeman. He attended the police leadership school for a few months in 2007, and upon its completion became the commandant of the C detachment of the mobile brigade corps pioneer unit on 9 July 2008. His rank was raised to adjunct police chief commissioner on the same year. Suhendri's detachment was deployed to safeguard the gubernatorial elections in North Maluku province that year. The following year, on 9 September 2009 he became the chief of the mobile brigade unit in the Riau Islands police. Upon undergoing a preparatory course for police chief, on 29 September 2010 he was named as the police chief of Tanjungpinang, the Riau Islands' capital. He officially took office in an inauguration ceremony on 15 November of that year.

During his tenure as Tanjungpinang police chief, Suhendri threatened to fire and prosecute police personnel involved in fuel embezzlement and to arrest members of the Islamic Defenders Front in the city conducting unauthorized, vigilant crackdown on gambling machines. In March 2011, Suhendri led the interrogation of the Riau Islands acting provincial secretary Arifin and his wife Herlina Wati after he was named as a suspect in a corruption case. Suhendri returned to the mobile brigade unit of the East Java police as its deputy chief on 23 November 2012.

Suhendri was named as the chief of the Jambi police mobile brigade unit on 30 August 2013, with him being inducted into office on 19 September. He was promoted to police chief commissioner on 1 January 2014, and was selected to command that year's flag lowering ceremony at the Presidential Palace on the occasion of Indonesia's independence, which was the last to be led by Susilo Bambang Yudhoyono as president. During his tenure, he oversaw the construction of a new mosque in the unit's headquarters and deployed troops to quell inter-village riots in Kerinci. After about two years in Jambi, Suhendri was reassigned for the same position in the Bali police, where he was appointed on 13 May 2015 and inducted on 27 May.

From Bali, Suhendri underwent further police education at the senior staff and leadership school in 2016, with him being functionally assigned to the mobile brigade corps as a policy analyst. On 22 May 2017, Suhendri was appointed to command the student and cadet development corps in the police academy, replacing Djoko Hari Utomo who was sidelined following the death of a cadet. Suhendri received the National Police Meritorious Service Star, 2nd class, on the occasion of the police's 72nd anniversary ceremony on 11 July 2018. He was named the human resources chief of the mobile brigade corps on 1 January 2019, and on 15 September 2020 was appointed to the one-star position of director of vital objects security on 15 September 2020. He was promoted accordingly to the rank of police brigadier general on 19 October 2020 and reported his promotion to the national police chief a day after. Throughout his career, Suhendri was responsible for the security of national-level events, including the 2021 National Sports Week in Jayapura and the 2023 ASEAN Summit in Labuan Bajo. He also commanded the security details for candidates in the 2024 presidential election.

After about half a decade serving in the position, on 27 February 2026 Suhendri was appointed as chief (first grade) bomb disposal technician of the police mobile brigade corps, a two-star technical position within the corps. Suhendri, who acted as the principal advisor to the police mobile brigade corps commander on bomb disposal matters, was installed for the position on 2 April 2026. After he was promoted to the rank of inspector general on 19 March 2026, he was discharged from his old directorship on 31 March. On 1 July 2026, Suhendri became the commander of the 80th police anniversary ceremony, which was held at the mobile brigade corps training ground. Suhendri returned to the Riau Islands with his appointment as the police chief of the province on 2 September 2026, and was inducted for the new position the day after.
