= Tuanku Nan Renceh =

19th century Indonesian religious leader and revolutionary

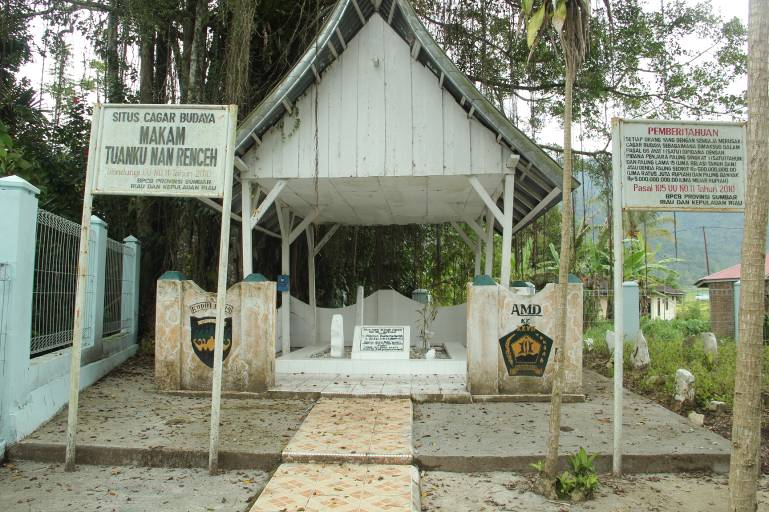
Tomb of Tuanku Nan Renceh in Kamang Mudiak, Kamang Magek, Agam Regency

Tuanku Nan Renceh was an Islamic cleric, leader and commanding figure highly regarded in Indonesia as a fighter against the Dutch colonialism in the battle known as the Padri War from 1803-1838. Not much is known about this figure, other than his charismatic status. He is also known for his commitment to upholding the Shari'a. From the Dutch record, he was considered an antagonist figure, who was responsible for the violence in the Plateau of Padang.

The real name of Tuanku Nan Renceh was Abdullah. He was born in Nagari Kamang in 1780 and died during the Padri War. He was a disciple of the prominent ulama of his time, Tuanku Nan Tuo. After receiving Tuo's teaching, he became a padri, a group of people who advocated for the puritanical approach in Islam inspired by Muhammad ibn Abd al-Wahhab. He later became the teacher who gave birth to many padri warfighters.

The arrival of three pilgrims from Mecca in 1803 inspired Tuanku Nan Renceh. He then began to initiate jihad against all the perceived heresy practiced in Minangkabau society by promoting and the propagation of the Sunnah. His reformist vision on the societal custom including the matriarchal adat (local customary) system was challenged by the penghulus (headman of the traditional Minangkabau society) in some nagaris (traditional settlement), who insisted on fighting for the Minangkabau hereditary tradition, thus giving birth to the branch of padris with the conflicting approach toward the Islamic reform.

== Padri War ==
Tuan Ko Nan Renceh was an extremist Wahabbi puritan. Nan Renceh with Tuan Ku Lintau and Tuan Ku Pasaman were at war with the Adat and would forbid cock-fighting, gambling and sireh; and forced women to cover up. Any that disagreed with their interpretation of Islam were punishable by death. They grew wealthy by enslaving the population to grow coffee and other agriculture. While forcing residents to wear white and grow beards, they would wear red.
