= Bonjol =

- Location within Indonesia
- Coordinates: 0°0′0″S 100°13′0″E
- Country: Indonesia
- Province: West Sumatera
- Regency: Pasaman

Population (2020)
  - Total: 26,282
  - Density: 135/km^{2} (350/sq mi)
- Time zone: UTC+7 (WIB)

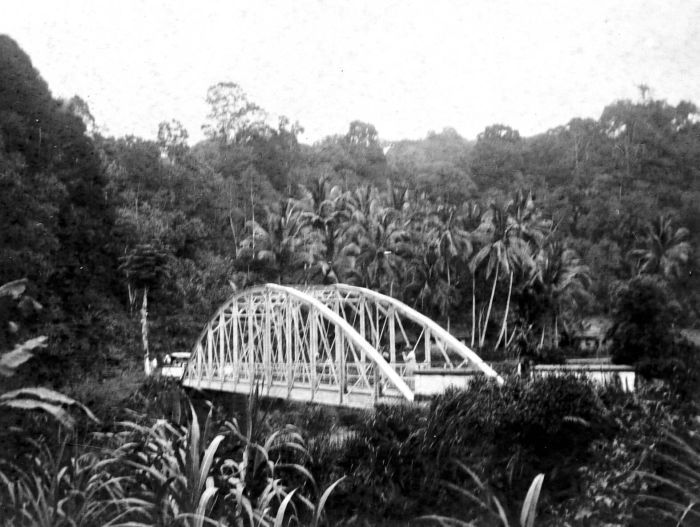
bridge in Bonjol

Bonjol is name of a district (kecamatan) in the Pasaman Regency (kabupaten Pasaman), province West Sumatera, Indonesia. It is famous especially for its location as it lies just at the equator line. Bonjol is also the place of birth of Tuanku Imam Bonjol, a national hero in the struggle against Dutch rule. Almost 75% of the population are farmers.

Bonjol lies around the Trans-Sumatran Highway, approximately 60 km north of Bukittinggi. Every bus going on the route between Medan and Bukittinggi (or Padang) goes through it and crosses the equator there.

== See also ==
- Ruit van Bonjol
