= Tuanku Imam Bonjol =

Indonesian Islamic leader (1772–1864)

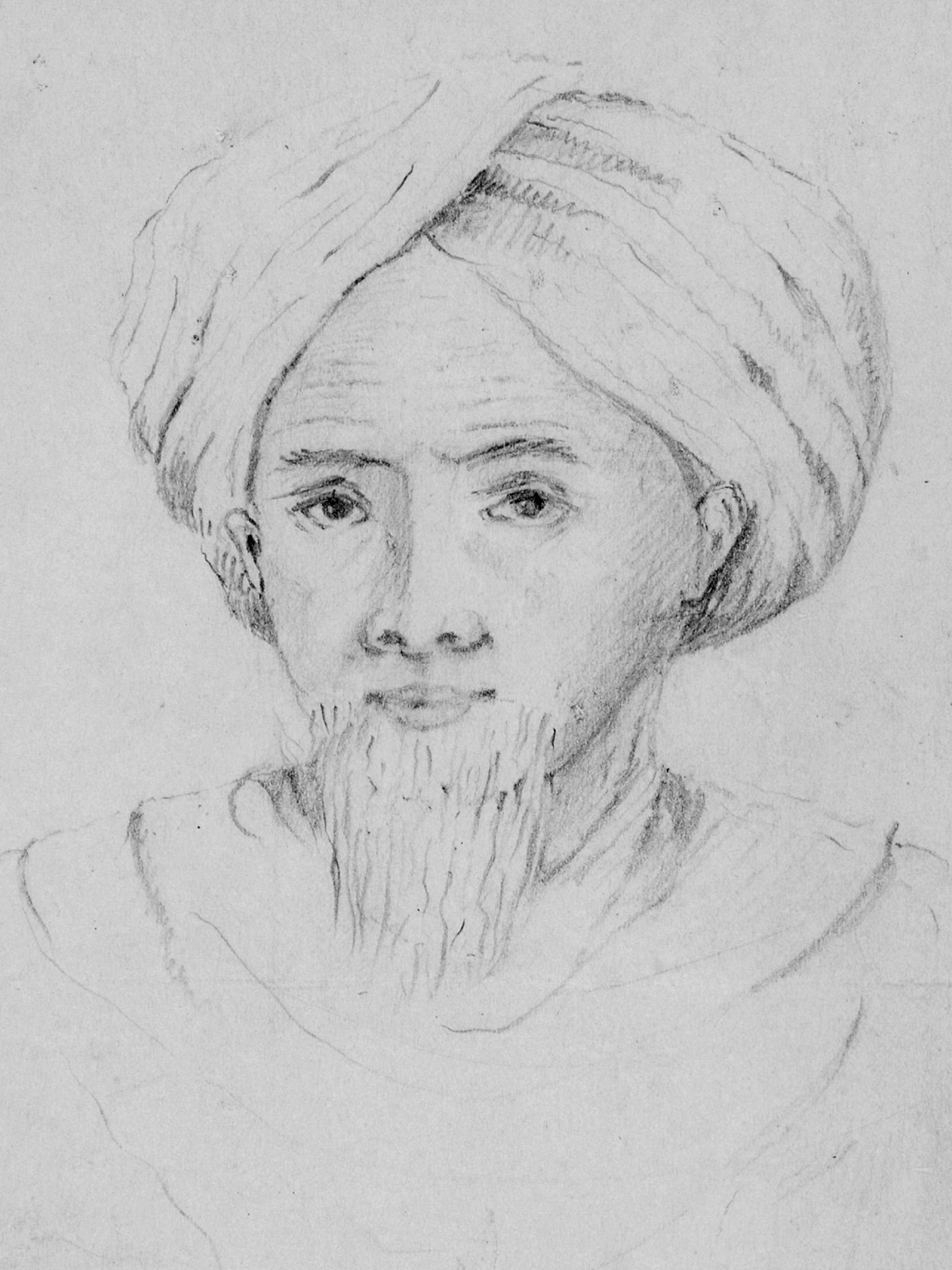
- Tuanku Imam Bonjol

Personal life
- Born: 1772 Bonjol, Pagaruyung Kingdom
- Died: 6 November 1864 (aged 92) Manado, Dutch East Indies
- Known for: Padri War
- Other names: Muhammad Syawab; Peto Syarif; Malim Basa

Religious life
- Religion: Sunni Islam
- Creed: Athari

Tuanku Imam Bonjol (1772 – 6 November 1864), also known as Muhammad Syahab, Peto Syarif, and Malim Basa, was a puritan Islamist cleric and prominent leader in the Padri movement in Central Sumatra. He was declared a National Hero of Indonesia.

== Biography ==
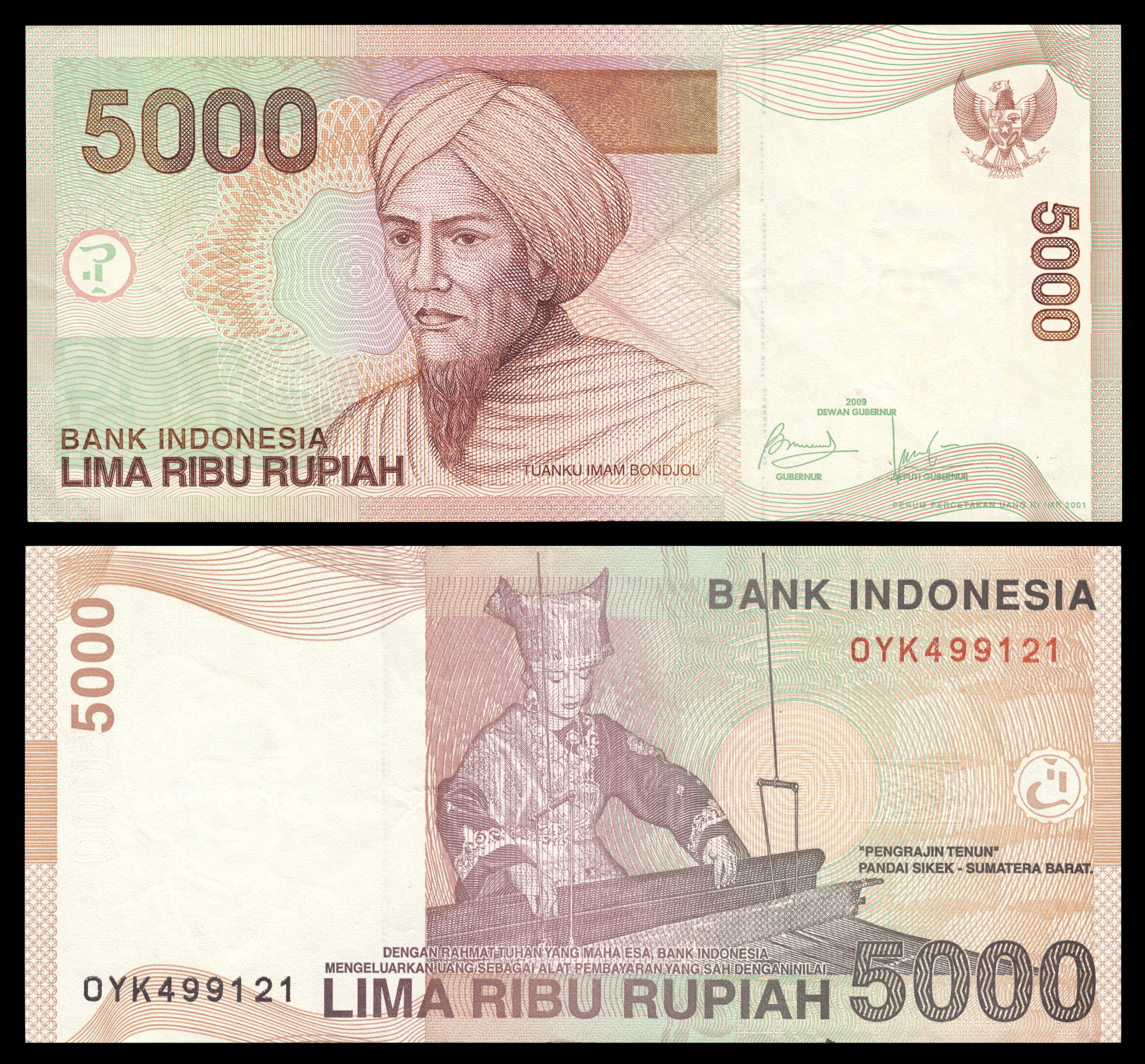
Tuanku Imam Bonjol featured in the 5,000-rupiah banknote issued by Bank Indonesia.

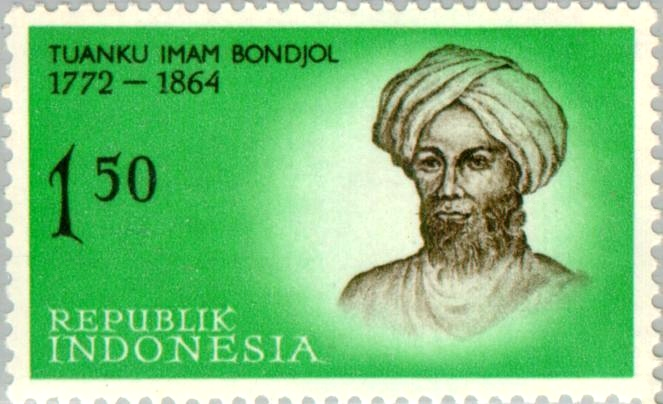
Tuanku Imam Bonjol featured in a 1961 stamp.

Tuanku Imam Bonjol was born in Bonjol, Pasaman, West Sumatra. His parents name were Bayanuddin (father) and Hamatun (mother). His father is a Minangkabau cleric who came from Sungai Rimbang, Suliki, Limapuluh Koto. His mother was a North African who migrated to Bonjol with her brother.

Syarif was immersed in Islamic studies as he grew up, studying first from his father and later under various other Muslim theologians. After founding the state of Bonjol, he became involved in the war as a Padri leader. The Padri movement, which has been compared to the Wahhabi movement in the Emirate of Diriyah (present day, Saudi Arabia), was an effort to return the Islam of the area to the purity of its roots by removing local distortions like gambling, cockfighting, the use of opium and strong drink, tobacco, and so forth. It also opposed the powerful role of women in the matrilineal Minangkabau culture. The Adat, or traditionalist, position was that local custom that pre-dated the arrival of Islam should also be respected and followed.

Feeling their leadership position threatened, the traditionalists appealed to the Dutch for help in their struggle against the Padris. At first, the Dutch were not able to win militarily against the Padris because their resources were stretched thin by the Diponegoro resistance in Java. In 1824, the Dutch signed the Masang Agreement ending hostilities with the state of Bonjol.

Subsequently, however, once the Diponegoro resistance was suppressed, the Dutch attacked the state of Pandai Sikat in a renewed effort to gain control of West Sumatra. Despite valiant fighting by the Indonesians (by this time the traditionalists had realised they didn't want to be ruled by the Dutch either and had joined forces with the Padris in their resistance), the overwhelming power of the Dutch military eventually prevailed. Syarif was captured in 1832 but escaped after three months to continue the struggle from his tiny fortress in Bonjol.

After three years of siege, the Dutch finally managed to sack Bonjol on 16 August 1837. Through a negotiation ruse, the Dutch again captured Syarif and exiled him, first to Cianjur in West Java, then to Ambon, and later to Manado in Sulawesi. He died on 6 November 1864, at the age of 92 and is buried in Sulawesi. The site of his grave is marked by a Minangkabau (West Sumatran) house.

== Controversy over National Hero Title ==
Imam Bonjol and the Padri movement have been criticised for Wahhabism and conducting crimes against the Batak, according to some Batak historians, specifically Mangaradja Onggang Parlindungan, as well as international sources. Some Batak historians argued that Imam Bonjol does not deserve the National Hero title because of his past actions and his ideological motives. Reports from Dutch colonial and Batak lore about the notoriety of Imam Bonjol's movement have been the source for almost a century of discussion among experts on the role of Imam Bonjol in the past.

== See also ==
- History of Indonesia
- Padri War
