= Para Perintis Kemerdekaan =

- Handbill for Para Perintis Kemerdekaan, 1982
- Directed by: Asrul Sani
- Screenplay by: Asrul Sani
- Based on: Di Bawah Lindungan Ka'bah by Haji Abdul Malik Karim Amrullah
- Produced by: Andy Azhar
- Starring: Cok Simbara; Soultan Saladin; Mutiara Sani
- Cinematography: Lukman Hakim Nain
- Edited by: Cassim Abbas
- Production companies: Taty & Sons Jaya Film
- Release date: 1981
- Country: Indonesia
- Language: Indonesian

Para Perintis Kemerdekaan (English: Pioneers of Freedom) (Note: Other translations include Founders of Freedom (Sen & Hill 2007, p. 156) and Pioneers of Independence (Izharuddin 2016, p. 50).) is a 1981 Indonesian historical drama film directed by Asrul Sani. Starring Cok Simbara, Soultan Saladin, and Mutiara Sani, the film follows young Muslims who challenge Dutch colonial rule in 1920s West Sumatra using diverse approaches. The film's characters have been likened to various historical figures, such as Rasuna Said.

Advertised as an adaptation of the 1938 novel Di Bawah Lindungan Ka'bah (Under the Protection of Ka'bah), the debut novel of Haji Abdul Malik Karim Amrullah, Para Perintis Kemerdekaan also drew from histories and biographies. The film was partly shot on location in West Sumatra as part of a three-year production process. Due to its religious and political themes, as well as the then-upcoming legislative election, the film was censored and its release delayed. Although nominated for several Citra Awards at the 1981 Indonesian Film Festival, it received mixed reviews from contemporary critics. Since the 2000s, critical assessment has been more favourable.

== Plot ==
Para Perintis Kemerdekaan follows three students of Hajji Jalaluddin (Mansyur Syahdan), a Padang-based preacher who teaches that Muslims' Qur'anic obligation to fight for the truth demands that they challenge Dutch colonial rule. These students, Hamid (Cok Simbara), Zainuddin (Soultan Saladin), and Halimah (Mutiara Sani), challenge colonial rule in different ways after their teacher is arrested for sedition.

Hamid travels to Padang Panjang to continue his studies, but is accosted on the train by a militiaman. He is defended by Zainuddin, who punches the militiaman. Over time, Hamid enters journalism and writes several anti-Dutch articles in the newspaper Menara. Meanwhile, he is asked to convince Zainab (Camelia Malik) to marry a government official named Wahab (Yan Bastian). Although Hamid is enamoured with Zainab, he agrees, and serves as the officiant of the marriage. When Menara is forcibly closed, he flees to Mecca to continue his Islamic studies.

Zainuddin embraces communism, leading him to be abandoned by his religious friends. Desiring to directly challenge Dutch rule, he joins an armed uprising that is successful in killing several regional leaders and their staff. However, this uprising is soon quashed, and its members—including Zainuddin—are massacred.

Halimah is financially abandoned by her husband due to her support for Indonesian independence. To force a divorce, she makes plans to renounce Islam but is stopped mid-sentence after receiving a divine revelation. Her marriage is dissolved by a meeting of the local ulamas (Islamic scholars). She then works to empower the women of Padang, combining faith with weaving and sewing. She comes under increased scrutiny, and after using the banned words "Indonesia" and "merdeka" (independent), she is arrested. At her trial, she declares that all peoples deserve independence and welfare, but is convicted.

== Production ==
The screenplay for Para Perintis Kemerdekaan was written by Asrul Sani. It is based on several works. Of these, Di Bawah Lindungan Ka'bah (Under the Protection of Ka'bah, 1938), the debut novel of Haji Abdul Malik Karim Amrullah (better known as Hamka), is credited in the opening credits. Sani identified other inspirations as including Hamka's history Sejarah Islam di Sumatera (History of Islam in Sumatra, 1950) and biography of his father Ayahku (My Father, 1951), as well as Deliar Noer's academic study Gerakan Modern Islam di Indonesia, 1900–1942 (Modern Islamic Movements in Indonesia, 1900–1942). According to the film scholar David Hanan, much was drawn from the chapter "Nikah Si Kani" ("Kani's Marriage") in Ayahku, which dealt with the practice of women renouncing Islam to seek an annulment in 1920s Sumatra.

Production was handled by Taty & Sons Jaya Film, which purchased the right to adapt Di Bawah Lindungan Ka'bah for two million rupiah in 1977; previously, Sani had discussed with Hamka the possibility of adapting the novel and other West Sumatran stories to film during a chance meeting at Taman Ismail Marzuki. Filming began in December 1977, following a syukuran or small thanksgiving ceremony, and lasted for three years.

Some filming was done on-location in West Sumatra, with cinematography done by Lukman Hakim Nain. Music from the region was included in the soundtrack, provided by Idris Sardi. However, the cast—which featured Cok Simbara as Hamid, Soultan Saladin as Zainuddin, and Mutiara Sani as Halimah, as well as Rendra Karno, Marlia Hardi, and Cassin Abbas—were not locals but established actors based in Jakarta. The film experienced significant rewrites during filming; Camelia Malik recalled that she had been offered a starring role when she was first cast, but after rewrites her character Zainab had little screen time.

== Analysis ==
Para Perintis Kemerdekaan drew heavily from the history of West Sumatra, with several books on the subject cited as inspirations. It was Asrul Sani's second film with a historical setting, following Pagar Kawat Berduri (Chain Link Fence, 1961). However, these films' settings differed. Where Para Perintis Kemerdekaan focused on pro-independence activities in 1920s West Sumatra, Pagar Kawat Berduri had been set in a Dutch-run internment camp during the Indonesian National Revolution in the late 1940s.

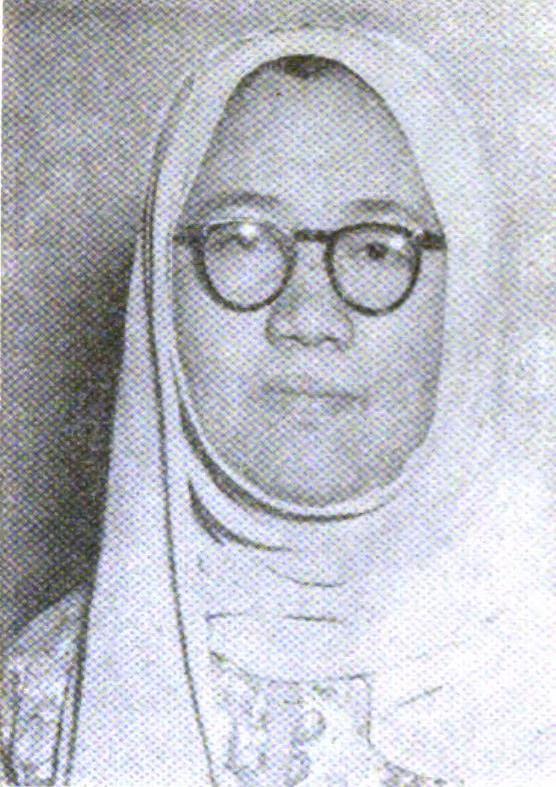
Film scholar David Hanan likens Halimah to the women's rights activist Rasuna Said (pictured).

David Hanan highlights the importance of history in Para Perintis Kemerdekaan, which is emphasised even before the opening credits with an intertitle that describes Japan's victory in the Russo-Japanese War as "the first ray of hope for the occupied countries of Asia". This scene is followed by a montage of photographs that feature historical leaders from Sumatra and Java, including former president Sukarno. He traces these historical influences into the film itself, noting parallels between Halimah and the women's rights activist Rasuna Said, as well as Hajji Jaluddin with the preacher Tahir bin Jalaluddin. Writing in Tempo, Isma Sawitri noted similarities between the character Haji Wali and Hamka's father Abdul Karim Amrullah; Syekh Muktaruddin and Muhammad Jamil Jambek; and an unnamed Marxist leader and Ahmad Khatib Datuk Batuah. She also identified the armed rebellion in the film as the 1927 Silungkang uprising in Sumatra.

Regarding the sequence of Halimah renouncing Islam to release herself from marriage in Para Perintis Kemerdekaan, Hanan notes that such practices were attested in 1920s Sumatra. However, as narrated by Hamka in Ayahku, the actual practice differed; rather than a council of Islamic scholars, decisions would be made by a single ulama. Consequently, such acts would not be policed by Dutch colonial forces. He attributes this shift to Sani's desire to highlight consensus-based decision making, or mufakat, over any single religious leader. The epiphany which stops Halimah from renouncing her faith was not part of the practice; a similar filmic technique had been used by Asrul Sani in Apa Jang Kau Tjari, Palupi? (What Are You Seeking, Palupi?, 1969) to convey the futility of the protagonist's efforts.

Themes of feminism have also been noted in Para Perintis Kemerdekaan. In her study of gender and Islam in Indonesian cinema, Alicia Izharuddin writes that, unlike many Indonesian contemporary films set during the colonial era, women "are constructed as repressed by colonial powers" without being sexualized or rendered passive. Rather, Halimah uses political activism to challenge patriarchal and colonial control, suggesting a "revolutionary Islam" that seeks to emancipate women and position them as equals in faith and politics. Izharuddin contrasts Halimah with Zainab, whom she describes as "an obedient colonial subject" whose Westernization fails to engender enlightenment. The Indonesian film critic Eric Sasono also highlights the challenge to authority, describing Para Perintis Kemerdekaan as the first Indonesian film to feature a female main character that "opposes the decision of the Islamic authority of the community where she lives". (Note: Sasono identifies Perempuan Berkalung Sorban (Woman with a Turban, 2009) as the second (Sasono 2013, p. 64).)

== Release ==
Para Perintis Kemerdekaan was released in 1981, its screening delayed in part by the Suharto regime's concern for its political influence. Initially, the film was scheduled to be released under the title Di Bawah Lindungan Ka'bah. However, the title was changed to remove the reference to the Ka'bah, as the holy site was also used as the logo of the United Development Party; this Islamist party would contest the 1982 Indonesian legislative election in opposition to the ruling Golkar Party. Several scenes were also removed due to their sympathetic portrayals of an Islamist party.

Screening of the film was limited in Indonesia, with showings concentrated in East Java and West Sumatra. In Jakarta, showings were not allowed until after the election. Ultimately, the film had limited box office success. In Malaysia, Para Perintis Kemerdekaan received a limited screening after its Indonesian release, albeit under the title Di Bawah Lindungan Ka'bah. The film was shown at several international film festivals, including the Berlin International Film Festival in 1982 and the Melbourne International Film Festival in 1987.

== Reception ==
Contemporary reviews were mixed. Reviewing Para Perintis Kemerdekaan for Kompas, Marselli Sumarno wrote that the film's greatest strength was its actualization of Islamic thought, including an emphasis on the need for a moral foundation for any physical struggle. However, he took issue with the film's emphasis on dialogue as well as the multi-structured approach to storytelling. Reviewing for Tempo, Isma Sawitri highlighted the film's soundtrack and the beauty of Sumatra, but considered film's attempt to include large amounts of history to detrimentally affect its ability to develop its characters.

Initially, Hamka was excited by the adaptation. In a letter dated 4 August 1977, which was reproduced in advertising material, he wrote that Sani had expanded his novel into a scenario of high quality that also featured scenes of history. However, over time Hamka distanced himself from the film. In a letter dated 14 April 1981, shortly before his death, Hamka requested that his name be removed from the film due to its extensive deviations from the source material.

Subsequent critical reception of Para Perintis Kemerdekaan has been more positive. In 2011, after a second adaptation of Di Bawah Lindungan Ka'bah was released, Makbul Mubarak of The Jakarta Post contrasted the new production with the 1981 release. Rather than rely on the tropes of teen romances, he wrote, Para Perintis Kemerdekaan had been a "masterpiece" that "genuinely tried to tap to the essence of Hamka's vision" by using the romance between Hamid and Zainab as a metaphor for the burgeoning nationalist movement of the 1920s. In 2018, the film critic Adrian Jonathan Pasaribu listed Para Perintis Kemerdekaan as one of Indonesia's best classic movies, praising its deft portrayal of religious ethics and willingness to question whether "people from the same country will be good to each other".

At the 1981 Indonesian Film Festival, Para Perintis Kemerdekaan was nominated for four Citra Awards: Best Film, Best Director (Asrul Sani), Best Screenplay (Asrul Sani), and Best Musical Direction (Idris Sardi). It won none of these awards, but was granted an Usmar Ismail plaque for "Best Theme Dealing with Struggle" and lauded for its use of traditional music.

== Works cited ==
- AR (19 December 1981). "31 Film untuk Berlin" [31 Films for Berlin]. Kompas (in Indonesian). Jakarta. p. 5.
- Gayo (24 December 1977). "Nama dan Peristiwa: Hamka" [Names and Events: Hamka]. Kompas (in Indonesian). Jakarta. p. 6.
- Hanan, David (2017). Cultural Specificity in Indonesian Film: Diversity in Unity. Springer. ISBN 978-3-319-40874-3.
- Izharuddin, Alicia (2016). Gender and Islam in Indonesian Cinema. Springer. ISBN 978-981-10-2173-2.
- "Kredit Para Perintis Kemerdekaan" [Credits for Para Perintis Kemerdekaan]. filmindonesia.or.id (in Indonesian). Konfiden Foundation. Archived from the original on 10 February 2026.
- Mubarak, Makbul (28 August 2011). "From Masterpiece to Teen Flick". The Jakarta Post. Archived from the original on 11 February 2026.
- "Pagar Kawat Berduri" [Barbed Wire Fence]. filmindonesia.or.id (in Indonesian). Konfiden Foundation. Archived from the original on 21 January 2025.
- "Para Perintis Kemerdekaan" [Pioneers for Freedom]. filmindonesia.or.id (in Indonesian). Konfiden Foundation. Archived from the original on 10 February 2026.
- Para Perintis Kemerdekaan [Pioneers for Freedom] (handbill) (in Indonesian), 1981
- "Penghargaan Para Perintis Kemerdekaan" [Awards for Para Perintis Kemerdekaan]. filmindonesia.or.id (in Indonesian). Konfiden Foundation. Archived from the original on 11 February 2026.
- "Pioneers of Freedom". Melbourne: Melbourne International Film Festival. Archived from the original on 11 February 2026.
- "Sang Ulama di Belakang Film" [The Islamic Scholar Behind the Film]. Tempo (in Indonesian). Jakarta. 3 October 1981. p. 60. Archived from the original on 11 February 2026.
- Sarahtika, Dhania (28 March 2018). "Oldies but Goodies: Five of the Best Classic Indonesian Movies". The Jakarta Globe. Jakarta. Archived from the original on 11 February 2026.
- Sasono, Eric (2013). "Islamic Revivalism and Religious Piety in Indonesian Cinema". In Daniels, Timothy P. (ed.). Performance, Popular Culture, and Piety in Muslim Southeast Asia. Palgrave Macmillan. pp. 45–75. doi:10.1057/9781137318398_3. ISBN 978-1-349-45759-5.
- Sawitri, Isma (3 October 1981). "Bukan Lagi Roman Hamka" [No Longer Hamka's Novel]. Tempo (in Indonesian). p. 59. Archived from the original on 11 February 2026.
- Sen, Krishna; Hill, David T. (2007). Media, Culture, and Politics in Indonesia. Equinox. ISBN 978-979-3780-42-9.
- Sumarno, Marselli (4 October 1981). "Dua Jenis Masakan: Para Perintis Kemerdekaan" [Two Types of Cooking: Para Perintis Kemerdekaan]. Kompas (in Indonesian). Jakarta. p. 5.
- Yusoff, Norman (20 September 2019). "Indonesian Film Culture in 1970s and 1980s Malaysia". Cinema Poetica. Jakarta. Archived from the original on 19 November 2019.
