= Di Bawah Lindungan Ka'bah =

Di Bawah Lindungan Ka'bah, or its English translation Under the Protection of Ka'Bah, may refer to:

- Di Bawah Lindungan Ka'bah (novel), a novel by Hamka
- Di Bawah Lindungan Ka'bah (film), a 2011 Indonesian film
