= Fachruddin =

Fachruddin is a given name and a surname. Notable people with the name include:

- Fachruddin Aryanto (born 1989), Indonesian footballer
- Abdul Rozak Fachruddin (1916–1995), Indonesian Islamic religious leader
