= Jazuli =

Jazuli may refer to:

- Jazuli, the protagonist of the novel Tuan Direktur
- Muhammad Jazuli, birth name of KH Fakhruddin
- Jazuli order of Sufism, after Muhammad al-Jazuli

== See also ==
- al-Jazuli (disambiguation)
