= Fakih Usman =

Indonesian Islamic leader and politician (1904–1968)

Kyai Hajji Fakih Usman
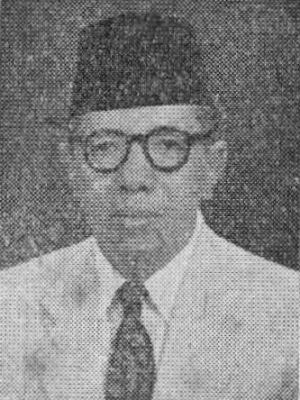
- Official portrait, 1956

6th Minister of Religious Affairs
- In office 3 April 1952 – 30 July 1953
- President: Sukarno
- Prime Minister: Wilopo
- Preceded by: Wahid Hasyim
- Succeeded by: Masjkur
- In office 21 January 1950 – 6 September 1950
- President: Sukarno
- Prime Minister: Abdul Halim
- Preceded by: Masjkur
- Succeeded by: Wahid Hasyim

Member of the People's Representative Council
- In office 4 March 1956 – 5 July 1959
- Constituency: West Java

Member of the Constitutional Assembly
- In office 4 March 1956 – 5 July 1959
- Constituency: West Java

Personal details
- Born: Fakih Usman; 2 March 1904 Gresik, Dutch East Indies
- Died: 3 October 1968 (aged 64) Indonesia
- Party: Masyumi
- Occupation: Islamic leader; politician
- Cabinet: Halim; Wilopo

Fakih Usman (alternatively spelled as Faqih Usman; Indonesian pronunciation: [ˌfakɪh ˈʊsman]; 2 March 1904 – 3 October 1968) was an Indonesian Islamic leader and politician of the Masyumi Party. He twice served as the Minister of Religious Affairs under the cabinets of Abdul Halim and Wilopo from January until September 1950, and again from 1952 until 1953. In his early years, Fakih was criticized by conservative Muslims for his involvement with the modernist Islamic Muhammadiyah organization, though he is remembered fondly by the group. Born to a merchant and his wife in Gresik, Dutch East Indies, Fakih studied with his father and at a series of pesantren (Islamic boarding schools) until the 1920s.

In 1925 he became involved with the Muhammadiyah, rising quickly through the leadership until he became the head of the Surabaya branch in 1938. He was also active in local politics, in 1937, he became the treasurer of the Indonesian Islamic Assembly. He continued to be involved in politics and Islamic groups during the Japanese occupation and the ensuing national revolution. Following the end of the war, he was appointed Minister of Religious Affairs. As a minister, he oversaw educational and institutional reform, growing in prominence within the Muhammadiyah. He also served as deputy chairman of the organization under several different leaders before being chosen as its chairman in late 1968. He died several days later.

== Early life ==
Fakih Usman was born on 2 March 1904, in Gresik, East Java, in what was then the Dutch East Indies. His father, Usman Iskandar, was a wood merchant, and his mother, a housewife, was the daughter of an ulama (scholar of Islam). The couple, who were of modest means, had four other children, and the family's lack of a noble background meant the children were ineligible to receive an education at Dutch-run schools. Instead, Fakih studied Islam from a young age, receiving much of his instruction from his father. At the age of ten, Fakih began studying at a pesantren (Islamic boarding school) in Gresik, finishing four years later. In 1919 he continued his studies at several pesantren outside the city, including ones in rural Gresik and nearby Bungah.

== Early career ==
Fakih's father helped him become a trader, although Fakih continued to study independently. When the modernist Islamic organisation Muhammadiyah opened a branch in Gresik in 1922, Fakih was one of the first to join. (Note: Established by Ahmad Dahlan in 1912, Muhammadiyah advocated individual interpretation of the Qur'an and sunnah (ijtihad), rather than simple acceptance of interpretations traditionally propounded by the ulama (taqlid); such individual interpretation was believed to promote a greater interest in learning and knowledge (Djurdi 2010, p. xiv). Furthermore, Dahlan and the Muhammadiyah were heavily opposed to the syncretism which had developed in Java, the combination of traditions rooted in Hinduism and Buddhism with Islam (see kebatinan). As the Muhammadiyah sought to purify the religion from such non-Islamic influences, this criticism was highly controversial within traditional communities; said communities had long considered their practices to represent the true Islam. As such, Muhammadiyah was opposed by officials, Islamic teachers in the countrysides, and pious communities who rejected such ideas as deviant (Ricklefs 1993, p. 171). This opposition could involve threats of violence; Dahlan, for instance, received numerous death threats (Kutoyo 1985, p. 110).) Extremely active in the group, he became the Gresik branch's leader within three years, and under his leadership, the group was formally recognized by the central Muhammadiyah administration. Through his work with the Muhammadiyah in Gresik, Fakih became better known. He later transferred to the branch in Surabaya, a much larger city where, in 1929, he was chosen to sit on the city council.

He also remained active in commerce, running a construction material trade and shipbuilding shop. During this period he served on the local chamber of commerce. From 1932 to 1936 Fakih was a member of the Muhammadiyah's regional council, serving concurrently as the editor of the organisation's official magazine Bintang Islam, and on the Legal Affairs Committee. As he became more active, Fakih began commuting regularly from Surabaya to Gresik, handling Muhammadiyah's business in Surabaya and the wood company in Gresik; this commute was done in Fakih's car, a rare luxury at the time.

Studying Dutch in his spare time, Fakih continued to improve his knowledge of Islam by studying the thoughts of Muhammad Abduh. However, conservative Muslims disapproved of Fakih's work with Muhammadiyah, giving him the nickname Londho silit ireng ("Dutchman with the black arse"), and often throwing stones at his home. On 21 September 1937, Muhammadiyah, the conservative Nahdatul Ulama (NU), the merchants' cooperative Sarekat Islam, and several other Islamic groups – which for the past decade had been feuding – united to form an umbrella group: the Indonesian Islamic Assembly (Majilis Islam Ala Indonesia, or MIAI), based in Surabaya. Fakih served as treasurer within the organization. In 1938, he was made the head of the Surabaya branch of the Muhammadiyah, replacing Mas Mansoer. Two years later he began working full-time with the MIAI, having been selected as the head of its secretariat in mid-September 1940. To take this position, he resigned as head of the Surabaya branch of Muhammadiyah and as a city council member.

== Political career ==
=== National revolution ===
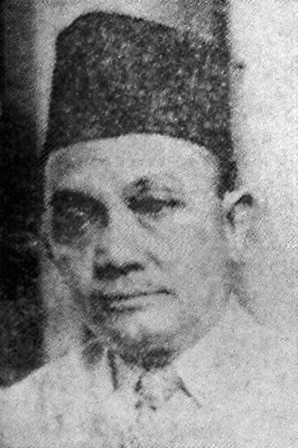
Photograph of Fakih Usman, 1952

On 9 March 1942, Governor-General Tjarda van Starkenborgh Stachouwer and head of the Royal Netherlands East Indies Army General Hein ter Poorten capitulated to the Empire of Japan, which had invaded the Indies the month before. As a result, the Indies fell under Japanese control. The Japanese banned all forms of organizations, and the MIAI was disbanded in May. It was reformed on 5 September 1942 following a meeting of 30 ulamas in the Des Indes Hotel in Jakarta and was recognized by the occupation government as the sole Islamic organization in the country. At the end of 1943, the organization was renamed the Council of Indonesian Muslim Associations (Partai Majelis Syura Muslimin Indonesia, abbreviated as Masyumi). Fakih was made a member of the Japanese-sponsored advisory board, or Syu Sangi In, for Surabaya. He held this position until the end of the occupation, concurrently serving on the Masyumi board.

After the atomic bombings of Hiroshima and Nagasaki and the proclamation of Indonesian independence in August 1945, the Japanese began withdrawing from the nascent republic. The Indonesian republican government, based in Jakarta and including Sukarno as president and Mohammad Hatta as vice president, began to take over infrastructure from the departing Japanese. By September 1945, however, allied British and Dutch forces had begun to enter the archipelago, hoping to reestablish the status quo ante. The British initially focused on Java and Sumatra and attempted to avoid armed confrontations with the Republican forces; the Dutch, meanwhile, spent the first months after the Japanese surrender reclaiming the eastern islands with help from Australia. Fakih, who had begun making contacts within the republican government, participated in the Indonesian Islamic Conference (Muktamar Islam Indonesia) in Yogyakarta from 7 to 8 November 1945.

As a result of these talks, Masyumi was made into a political party representing Islamic interests. Although Fakih returned to Gresik after the conference, he and his family soon evacuated to Malang due to the outbreak of a battle at Surabaya between Republican soldiers and British forces tasked with repatriating Dutch prisoners of war. In Malang, Fakih worked with Masjkur and Zainul Arifin to start an armed resistance to fight in the revolution against the returning Europeans. He served as deputy chief in command of this resistance, which consisted of the Japanese-trained Islamic units Sabilillah and Hizbullah. After the Dutch (Note: The British forces had withdrawn in December 1946 (Ricklefs 1993, p. 224).) launched Operation Kraai in December 1948, Fakih and his family escaped to Surakarta, where he again became active in Muhammadiyah. Fakih, serving as deputy chair under Bagus Hadikusumo, frequently commuted between Surakarta and the organization's head office in Yogyakarta.

=== Minister of Religion ===
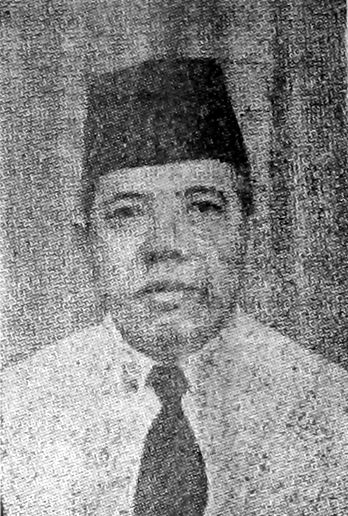
Photograph as Minister of Religious Affairs, 1952

In late 1949, the Indonesian and Dutch governments held a conference lasting several months, which resulted in Dutch recognition of Indonesian sovereignty on 27 December 1949. This led to the formation of the United States of Indonesia (Republik Indonesia Serikat, or RIS), which consisted of sixteen member states. On 21 January 1950, Fakih replaced Masjkur as the Minister of Religious Affairs in the Halim Cabinet, representing the Republic of Indonesia; at this point, the republic consisted of Yogyakarta, Banten, and much of Sumatra. Working with the RIS Minister of Religious Affairs Wahid Hasyim, Fakih began instituting a standardized religious curriculum in the public schools and modernizing education at religious schools.

The two also worked to unite the ministries. On 17 August 1950, the RIS and its member states became a unified republic. Hasyim was kept on as minister of religious affairs, with Fakih appointed director of religious education. Meanwhile, the different factions in Masyumi conflicted with the path the party was taking; the NU members thought Masyumi was becoming too political, abandoning its Islamic roots. When the Natsir Cabinet began to collapse, the Masyumi put forth Fakih as a potential Minister for Religious Affairs. This act was controversial because four of the five allocated slots for the party were already filled by non-NU members, and ultimately the NU pulled out of Masyumi, effective 5 April 1952. Fakih had been chosen with a majority of five votes, while the next leading candidate, Usman Raliby, received four.

Fakih was made the Minister of Religious Affairs in the Wilopo Cabinet and sworn in on 3 April 1952, which led to him and his family moving to the capital Jakarta. He began to work on reforming the ministry, including formalising its mission statement: to provide religious teachers, promote interfaith relations, and establish the dates of religious holidays. He worked on internal structure, including formalising the ministry's leadership hierarchy and opening the provincial and regional branches. The ministry also continued its promotion of religious education and was tasked with handling the numerous Indonesian pilgrims who went on the hajj. The Wilopo Cabinet collapsed on 30 July 1953, following an immigration and land dispute in Medan. Fakih was replaced by Masjkur.

=== Banning of the Masyumi ===
Fakih continued to work with the ministry and the Muhammadiyah, serving as the organisation's First Deputy Chair under Ahmad Rasyid Sutan Mansur. In 1956 he was one of three Muhammadiyah members who presented their concept of a truly Islamic society, one which emphasised social education. During this time he was more active with Masyumi, and after the 1955 Constituent Assembly election, Fakih was made a member of the Constitutional Assembly of Indonesia. This assembly, meant to reach an agreement for a new national constitution, failed to gain a consensus and was disbanded by President Sukarno with his decree of 5 July 1959. That year Fakih collaborated with Hamka, Joesoef Poear Abdullah, and Ahmad Joesoef to launch the magazine Pandji Masjarakat. Sukarno later disbanded Masyumi on 17 August 1960 after leading Masyumi members, such as Mohammad Natsir and Sjafruddin Prawiranegara, were involved with the Revolutionary Government of the Republic of Indonesia; Fakih had been involved in the negotiations with the Revolutionary Government, working with Mohammad Roem.

== Later career ==
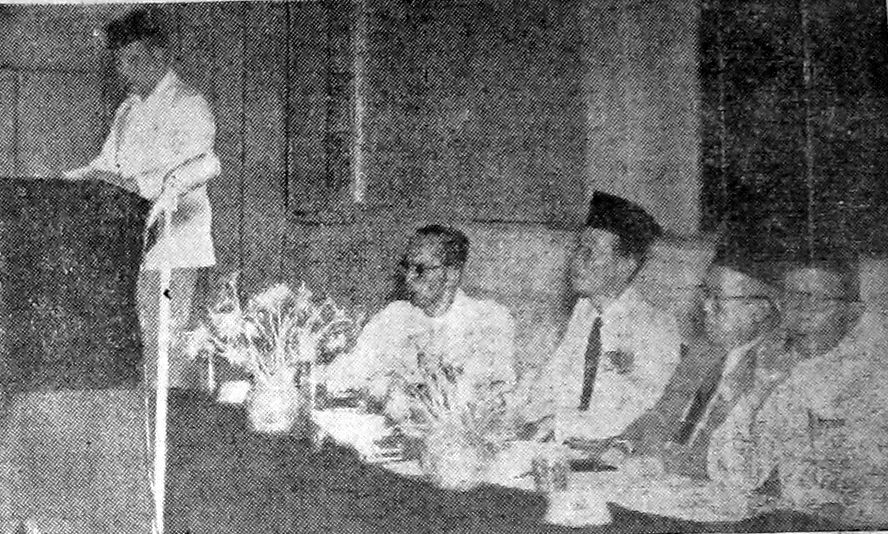
Fakih delivering a speech at a Muhammadiyah meeting, 1953

The disbanding of Masyumi left Fakih with more time to focus on the Muhammadiyah, serving as the Second Deputy Chair under Junus Anis. During a leadership course run by the organisation during Ramadhan of 1380 AH (February/March 1961), Fakih began promoting an institutional identity through his lecture "Apakah Muhammadiyah Itu" ("What is Muhammadiyah?"). This outlined the organisation as one based in dawah, focusing on real-world issues, and willing to work with the government to ensure a prosperous future for Muslims.

These concepts were later formulated in 1962 and established as an institutional identity, one which called for Muhammadiyah to work towards creating a truly Islamic society while opposing leftist politics. This, in turn, was followed by refactoring within the organisation to better adapt to the new identity. From 1962 until 1965 Fakih served as the First Deputy Chair of Muhammadiyah under Ahmad Badawi, guiding young religious leaders. During the killings and power shift that followed the 30 September Movement coup attempt, Fakih and several Muhammadiyah members sent a letter requesting that Masyumi be allowed to reform; this permission was not granted. For Badawi's second term, Fakih served as an advisor to the chairman, often taking management responsibilities. He was selected as the organisation's chairman at the 37th Muhammadiyah Congress in 1968.

== Death and legacy ==
On being chosen as chairman, Fakih began work to ensure there would be a successor, as his health was failing. On 2 October, at a joint meeting of the board at his home, he outlined his plans for his three-year period of leadership; Fakih also appointed Rasjidi and Abdul Rozak Fachruddin as temporary leaders while he went abroad for medical treatment. Fakih died on 3 October 1968, only a few days after being selected, and was replaced by Fachruddin on the day of his death; (Note: Muhammadiyah policy stated that a deceased leader had to be replaced before he was buried (Djurdi 2010, p. 182).) Fachruddin served as chairman for 24 years.

The street where Fakih lived as a child is now known as Fakih Usman Street. Within Muhammadiyah Fakih continues to be well respected. He is credited with the formulation of the "Muhammadiyah Personality" (Kepribadian Muhammadiyah), Muhammadiyah's institutional identity. Out of respect towards Fakih, Muhammadiyah continues to record his period as chairman as lasting the full three-year term. Didin Syafruddin, a faculty member at the Jakarta Islamic State University, writes that Fakih was highly dedicated to education, noting that five of Fakih's seven children eventually became doctors; Syafruddin also writes that, owing to a lack of human resources, Fakih was limited in his reforms while Minister of Religious Affairs. Former Muhammadiyah chairman Ahmad Syafi'i Maarif described Fakih as the "tranquil, cleansing water" (Note: Original: "... air tenang yang menghanyutkan") who served as a calming influence for Muhammadiyah when the organisation was in turmoil.

== Notes ==
Non-profit organization positions
Preceded by Ahmad Badawi	Chairman of the Muhammadiyah; 1968	Succeeded by Abdul Rozak Fachruddin
Government offices
Preceded by Wahid Hasyim	Minister of Religious Affairs of the Republic of Indonesia; 1952–1953	Succeeded by Masjkur
Preceded by Masjkur	Minister of Religious Affairs of the Republic of Indonesia; 1950	Succeeded by Wahid Hasyim
