= Masjkur =

Co-Founder of the United Development Party (c. 1917 – 1994

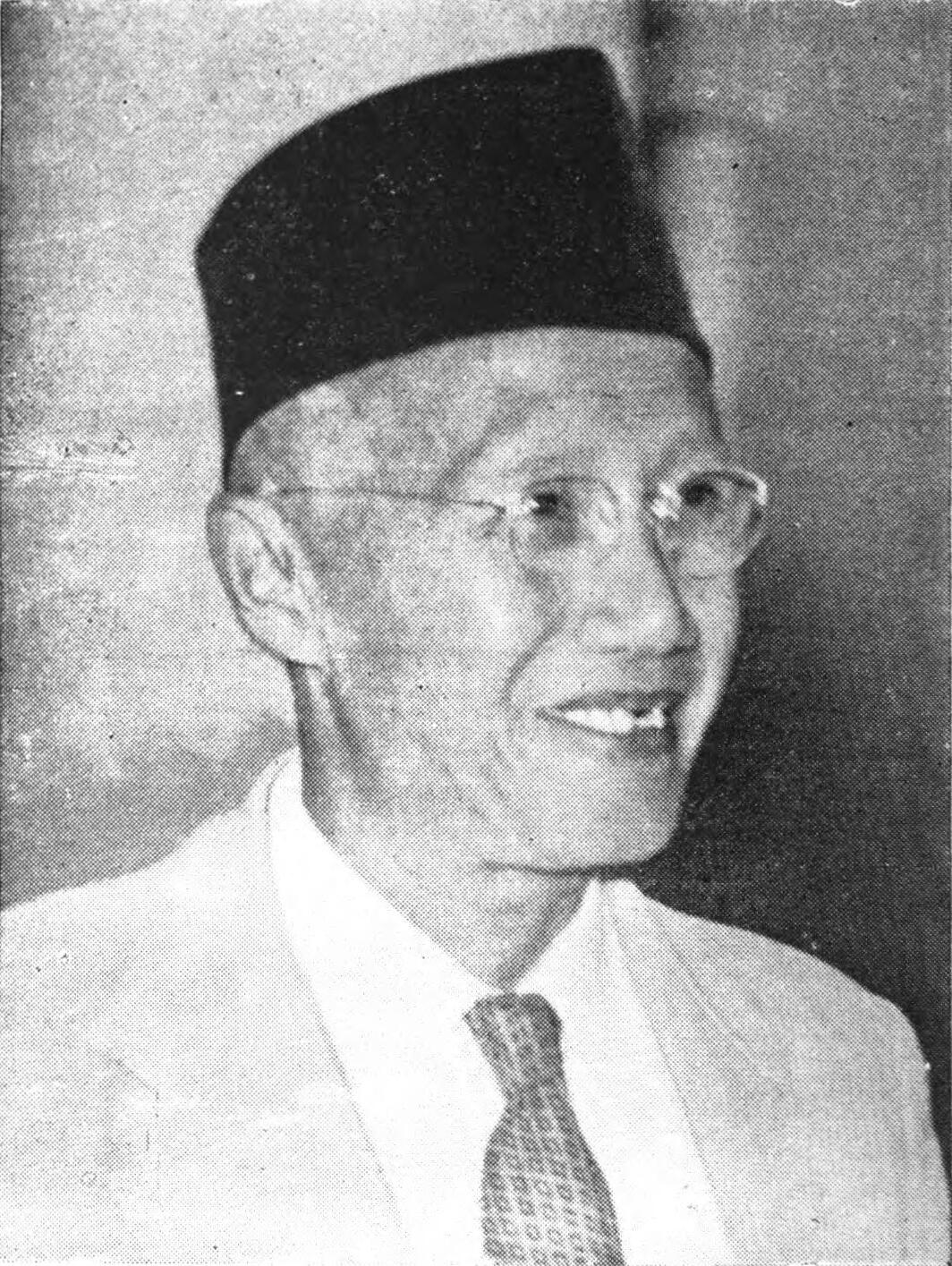
- Portrait, c. 1954

5th Indonesian Minister of Religious Affairs
- In office 11 November 1947 – 21 January 1950
- President: Sukarno
- Preceded by: Anwaruddin
- Succeeded by: Wahid Hasyim
- In office 30 July 1953 – 12 August 1955
- President: Sukarno
- Preceded by: Fakih Usman
- Succeeded by: Muhammad Ilyas

Personal details
- Born: 15 December 1917 Malang, East Java, Dutch East Indies
- Died: 25 December 1994 (aged 77) Malang, Indonesia
- Party: United Development Party
- Profession: Politician
- Known for: Co-founder of PPP

Masjkur (EISS: Masykur; 15 December 1917 ‒ 25 December 1994) was and Indonesian politician. He was one of the Founding Fathers of the United Development Party. He also served the Minister of Religious Affairs of the Republic of Indonesia during President Sukarno era.

Masjkur was prominently involved in the struggle for independence in the days of the Japanese occupation, as a member of the Board of Inquiry Efforts Preparation of Indonesian Independence. Masjkur was also noted as the founder of Homeland Defenders (PETA), a Japanese backed militia made in preparation of a possible allied invasion, and a predecessor to the Indonesian National Armed Forces. When the battle of Surabaya broke out, he supported the Laskar Hizbullah with his own wealth. His Islamic boarding school is also being used to train Laskar Hizbullah's forces.
