= Al-Jazuli (disambiguation) =

al-Jazuli (Arabic: الجزولي) may refer to:

- Abu Musa al-Jazuli (1146–1211), Moroccan philologist and grammarian
- Muhammad al-Jazuli (1404–1465), Moroccan Sufi leader
- Al-Jazuli Daf'allah (born 1935), Prime Minister of Sudan

== See also ==
- Zawiya of Sidi Muhammad Ben Sliman al-Jazuli, an Islamic religious complex in Marrakesh, Morocco
- Jazuli (disambiguation)
