= Di Bawah Lindungan Ka'bah (novel) =

1938 novel by Hamka

- Cover of a late printing
- Author: Hamka
- Language: Indonesian
- Genre: Novel
- Publisher: Balai Pustaka (I-VI); Bulan Bintang (VII-present)
- Publication date: 1938
- Publication place: Indonesia
- Media type: Print (hardback & paperback)
- Pages: 52
- OCLC: 63981241

Di Bawah Lindungan Ka'bah (Under the Protection of Ka'bah) is the 1938 debut novel of the Indonesian author Haji Abdul Malik Karim Amrullah (1908–1981). Written while the author worked in Medan as the editor of an Islamic weekly magazine, the novel follows the doomed romance of a young Minang couple from different social backgrounds. Generally praised for its simple yet eloquent diction, the novel has been twice adapted into film, first in 1977 and then in 2011.

== Background ==
Haji Abdul Malik Karim Amrullah, better known as simply Hamka, was the Sumatran-born son of a devout Muslim who viewed local traditions as hindering the progress of religion – his father's opinions influenced his. After a trip to Java and Mecca beginning when he was sixteen, he became a religious scholar in Deli, East Sumatra, then in Makassar, South Sulawesi. During these travels, especially while in the Middle East, he extensively read works by Islamic scholars and authors, such as those by the Egyptian writer Mustafa Lutfi al-Manfaluti, as well as Arabic-language translations of European works. In 1935 he left Makassar for Medan, North Sumatra, where he became the editor of an Islamic weekly magazine, during which time he wrote Di Bawah Lindungan Ka'bah, his first novel.

== Plot ==
Hamid is a young Muslim living in Sumatra. Two years after his father dies, the six-year-old Hamid and his mother move in with Haji Ja'far and his wife Asiah, members of the Minang nobility. There, Hamid finds a playmate in the couple's daughter Zainab. They are raised as brother and sister, and Ja'far pays for Hamid's education.

By the time he becomes an adult, Hamid no longer accepts the traditional class system, instead viewing everyone as equals. He finds himself attracted to Zainab for her noble character; unbeknownst to him, Zainab also has feelings for him. After moving to Padang Panjang, Hamid becomes distanced from his adopted family. However, he continues to correspond with Zainab.

After Ja'far's death, his extended family moves into the house. Hamid's mother dies soon after, warning her son that he would never be allowed to marry Zainab because of their different social statuses. Asiah later asks Hamid to convince Zainab to marry her cousin – traditional amongst the nobility – which he attempts. Thinking his efforts successful, yet heartbroken, Hamid makes his way to Mecca.

A year later, during the hajj, he meets his friend Saleh and Saleh's wife Rosna, who tell him that Zainab has not married as she loves only Hamid. Hamid intends to return home to be with Zainab after his pilgrimage, but he falls ill. After receiving news that an ill Zainab has died, Hamid dies shortly after.

== Style and themes ==
Di Bawah Lindungan Ka'bah has a simple, at times brief, writing style. The socialist Indonesian literary critic Bakri Siregar suggested that this may have been an effort by Balai Pustaka, the state publisher of the Dutch East Indies, to impose its own style on Hamka's writing. The Indonesian literary documentarian HB Jassin writes that Hamka's use of language was "simple, but with soul". (Note: Original: "Bahasa Hamka sederhana, tapi berjiwa.") The literary critics Maman S. Mahayana, Oyon Sofyan, and Achmad Dian view the novel's language as reflecting the works of al-Manfaluti.

Like other Indonesian works from the period, Di Bawah Lindungan Ka'bah is didactic and attempts to educate the reader based on the writer's viewpoint. However, this is less predominant than in other works, such as Marah Rusli's Sitti Nurbaya (1922). Jassin writes that Hamka used the novel to educate readers about Islamic fundamentals and undermine the power of local tradition.

Di Bawah Lindungan Ka'bah does not touch on polygyny, a topic much debated in Indonesian literature in the early 20th century; this is a trend found throughout Hamka's works. It does, however, continue the then-common theme of debasing tradition; however, unlike most Indonesian works – which showed modernity as a better way of life – Di Bawah Lindungan Ka'bah showed orthodox Islam as a path to true development.

== Release and reception ==
Di Bawah Lindungan Ka'bah was published by Balai Pustaka in 1938. The company generally refused religious-themed works, fearing that such works would cause developments against Dutch colonial priorities; however, they accepted Hamka's novel as they considered it a romance with a religious background. Hamka published a further four novels during his stay in Medan, including Tenggelamnya Kapal van der Wijck (The Sinking of the van Der Wijck; 1938), widely considered his best. Starting with the seventh printing, the novel was published by Bulan Bintang.

Jassin wrote that Di Bawah Lindungan Ka'bah was interesting and beautifully written. Siregar found the novel to be a well-crafted story made more powerful by its writing style. The Dutch scholar of Indonesian literature A. Teeuw described Hamka's work as too moralistic and sentimental; he wrote that a Western reader would at least provide a window into Indonesian culture in the 1930s.

== Adaptations ==
Di Bawah Lindungan Ka'bah has twice been adapted as a feature film. The first, directed by Asrul Sani, was released in 1977 as Para Perintis Kemerdekaan (Pioneers for Independence) and starred dangdut singer Camelia Malik as Zainab. This adaptation showed the two characters' love struggle against a background of struggle against the Dutch colonial powers. The film was a critical success, earning two Citra Awards out of six nominations at the 1977 Indonesian Film Festival.

The second adaptation, released in 2011 as Di Bawah Lindungan Ka'bah, was directed by Hanny R. Saputra and starred Herjunot Ali as Hamid and Laudya Cynthia Bella as Zainab. This adaptation focused on the love story. Slammed for its blatant product placement and artistic freedoms taken, the film was Indonesia's submission to the 84th Academy Awards for Best Foreign Language Film, but it did not make the final shortlist.
