= Tenggelamnya Kapal van der Wijck =

1938 novel by Haji Abdul Malik Karim Amrullah

Tenggelamnja Kapal van der Wijck
- Cover of the 22nd printing
- Author: Hamka
- Language: Indonesian
- Genre: Novel
- Publisher: Several (see below)
- Publication date: 1938
- Publication place: Indonesia (formerly Dutch East Indies)
- Media type: Print (hardback & paperback)
- Pages: 224 (22nd printing)
- ISBN: 978-979-418-055-6 (22nd printing)
- OCLC: 246136296

Tenggelamnja Kapal van der Wijck (The Sinking of the van der Wijck) is an Indonesian serial and later novel by Haji Abdul Malik Karim Amrullah (Hamka; 1908–1981) published in 1938. It follows the failed love between Zainuddin, a mixed-race man, and Hayati, a pure Minang woman.

Hamka, an Islamic scholar who disapproved of Minang adat (traditions), wrote Van der Wijck as a critique of the discrimination against mixed-race persons prevalent in Minang society at the time, as well as the subservient role of women. Originally released as a serial, Van der Wijck was republished as a novel after favourable popular reception. Described by the socialist literary critic Bakri Siregar as Hamka's best work, the work came under fire in 1962 because of similarities between it and Jean-Baptiste Alphonse Karr's Sous les Tilleuls (Under the Limes; 1832).

== Background ==
Haji Abdul Malik Karim Amrullah, better known as simply Hamka, was the Sumatran-born son of a devout Muslim who viewed local traditions as hindering the progress of religion – his father's opinions influenced his. After a trip to Java and Mecca beginning when he was sixteen, he became a religious scholar in Deli, East Sumatra, then in Makassar, South Sulawesi. During these travels, especially while in the Middle East, he extensively read works by Islamic scholars and authors, such as those by the Egyptian writer Mustafa Lutfi al-Manfaluti, as well as Arabic-language translations of European works. In 1935 he left Makassar for Medan, North Sumatra, where he became the editor of an Islamic weekly magazine, Pedoman Masjarakat. It was while in Medan that he wrote Van der Wijck, which was inspired in part by the sinking of an actual vessel in 1936.

== Plot ==
Zainuddin is an orphan. His Minang father died in exile after killing a relative over inheritance; his non-Minang mother has also died. He is now living with his father's friend, Mak Base, in Batipuh, Sumatra. As a person of mixed descent, he faces much discrimination from Minang conservatives. Although he loves Hayati, the daughter of a local nobleman, he is not allowed to be with her. He decides to move to Padang Panjang, although he continues to write to Hayati.

One day, Hayati goes to Padang Panjang to see Zainuddin and stays with her friend Khadijah. However, Khadijah's elder brother Aziz falls in love with Hayati, leading Zainuddin and Aziz to compete for Hayati's affections. Aziz, who is of purely Minang descent and from a noble background, is favoured by her family; they look down on Zainuddin, who is poor and of mixed heritage. Although Zainuddin receives a sizeable inheritance from Mak Base, he is too late to inform Hayati's family, and Aziz marries her.

In despair, Zainuddin and his friend Muluk go to Java, first to Batavia and then to Surabaya, where Zainuddin becomes known as a writer and philanthropist. Aziz and Hayati also move to Surabaya after Aziz is transferred. However, their relationship has soured, and Aziz's temper leads to him being fired, leaving the couple homeless. After a period living with Zainuddin, Aziz runs away to Banyuwangi, leaving Hayati for Zainuddin; in a letter, Aziz writes that Zainuddin is more deserving.

Zainuddin, who has suffered from his longing for Hayati, spurns her and tells her to return to Sumatra. The next day, she boards the Van der Wijck, which sinks off the coast of northern Java. Hearing the news, Zainuddin and Muluk rush to Tuban to search for her. They find her in a hospital, where Zainuddin and Hayati make up; she then dies in his arms. Zainuddin's health worsens not long afterwards. After he dies, he is buried next to Hayati.

== Themes ==
Like Di Bawah Lindungan Ka'bah (Under the Protection of Ka'bah; 1938) before it, Van der Wijck is critical of Minang adat (traditions), such as the treatment of persons of mixed descent and the role of women, an issue shown through Hayati's work to be an ideal wife despite Aziz mistreating her. Hamka found some traditions incompatible with the tenets of Islam and common sense and continued to criticise adat in his works.

== Release and reception ==
Van der Wijck was first published as a serial in his weekly Islamic-themed magazine Pedoman Masjarakat in Medan in 1938. According to Yunan Nasution, an employee of the magazine at the time, when the magazine was shipped to Kutaraja, Aceh (now Banda Aceh), readers would wait at the train station to buy and read the next instalment as soon as possible. Hamka also received fan mail, in which readers described the book as reflecting their own lives. However, conservative Muslims denounced the book, arguing that an Islamic scholar should not write romances.

After this generally favourable feedback, Hamka decided to publish it with a private publisher owned by his friend M. Syarkawi; by using a private publisher, he avoided the censorship imposed on authors by Balai Pustaka, the official publisher of the colonial government. A second printing was with Syarkawi's publisher, then the next five printings, beginning in 1951, were by Balai Pustaka, which had become the state-owned publisher of Indonesia after independence in 1945. The eighth printing, in 1961, was published by Nusantara in Jakarta, with printings after that by Bulan Bintang. The work has also had several printings in Malaysia.

The Indonesian socialist literary critic Bakri Siregar wrote that Van der Wijck was Hamka's best work, noting with interest how Zainuddin writes about politics after losing Hayati. The Indonesian literary critic Maman S. Mahayana found Van der Wijck to have good characterisation and use suspense better than contemporary Balai Pustaka publications; he suggested that this was a benefit of the work originally being published as a serial.

== Plagiarism case ==
In September 1962 a man named Abdullan S.P. wrote in the newspaper Bintang Timur that Van der Wijck was plagiarised from Jean-Baptiste Alphonse Karr's Sous les Tilleuls (Under the Limes; 1832), via the Arabic translation by Mustafa Lutfi al-Manfaluti; rumours of such plagiarism had been around before that. This became a widespread polemic in the Indonesian press, with most accusers originating from the leftist literary organisation Lekra, (Note: Lekra was anti-religious, which made Hamka, a scholar of Islam, an attractive target.) while non-leftist writers defended the novel. Critics found similarities between the two in both their plot and technique, especially the use of an exchange of letters between the main characters to further the plot.

The literary documentarian HB Jassin, who compared the two using an Indonesian translation of Sous les Tilleuls entitled Magdalena, wrote that there was very little chance that the novel should be called plagiarism, as Hamka's descriptions of locations were highly detailed and consistent with his earlier works. Jassin also emphasised that the novel discussed issues with Minang adat, which would not be found in a foreign work. Siregar, however, considered the similarities between Zainuddin and Steve, as well as Hayati and Magdalena, too close, suggesting plagiarism. The Dutch scholar of Indonesian literature A. Teeuw noted, without concluding whether similarities were conscious or unconscious, that the books had similarities, but agreed that Van der Wijck had purely Indonesian themes.

== Film adaptation ==
The film adaptation of Tenggelamnya Kapal van der Wijck was released in theaters on 19 December 2013. The film starred Herjunot Ali as Zainuddin, Pevita Pearce as Hayati, and Reza Rahadian as Aziz. The film was produced by Soraya Intercine Films, written by Donny Dhirgantoro and Imam Tantowi, and directed by Sunil Soraya. The film was the highest grossing Indonesian film of 2013 with over 1.7 million admissions. The film was nominated for five awards including, Best Actor in Leading Role, Best Actor in a Supporting Role, and Best Adapted Screenplay, and won one award for Best Visual Effects in the 2014 Indonesian Film Festival. The extended version, which ran for 3 hours and 30 minutes, was released in September 2014.

== See also ==
- The Sinking of van der Wijck (2013 film)
