= Camelia Malik =

Indonesian singer and actress (born 1955)

- Born: Camelia Malik; April 22, 1955 (age 71); Jakarta, Indonesia
- Other name: Mia
- Occupations: Singer, celebrity
- Years active: 1970–present
- Spouses: Fuad Hassan (m. 1974; died 1974) Reynold Panggabean (m. 1977; div. 1989) Harry Capri (m. 1989; div. 2013)
- Father: Djamaluddin Malik
- Relatives: Ahmad Albar (half-brother)

Camelia Malik (born 22 April 1955) is an Indonesian actress and dangdut singer. She is also known as Diva Dangdut Jaipong.

== Early life ==
Camelia Malik was born on 22 April 1955 in Jakarta, Indonesia, as the daughter of Djamaluddin Malik and Farida Al-Hasni. His maternal half brother is a rock singer, Ahmad Albar.

== Personal life ==
Camelia Malik had been married to Harry Capri for 24 years when on 6 May 2013, they announced at a press conference that they had begun divorce proceedings on 30 April 2013, having been living apart for a year. Malik was married previously in 1977 to Christian Protestant singer Reynold Panggabean. The interfaith marriage ended twelve years later in 1989. Her first marriage was to Fuad Hassan, a God Bless member, in 1974. Their marriage lasted until Fuad's death in the same year.

== Filmography ==
- Nada-nada Rindu
- Jaka Swara
- Laki-laki Pilihan
- Lorong Hitam
- Dalam Sinar Matamu
- Jangan Coba Raba-raba
- Mencari Ayah
- Para Perintis Kemerdekaan
- Gengsi Dong (1980)
- Pacar Ketinggalan Kereta (1989)

== Discography ==
- Colak-colek (1979)
- Raba-raba (1980)
- Ceplas-ceplos
- Gengsi Dong
- Wakuncar
- Murah Meriah
- Colak Colek II
- Rekayasa Cinta (2002)
