= Tuan Direktur =

1939 novel by Hamka

- Cover of the 4th printing
- Author: Hamka
- Language: Indonesian
- Genre: Novel
- Publisher: Balai Pustaka
- Publication date: 1939
- Publication place: Indonesia
- Media type: Print (hardback & paperback)
- Pages: 117

Tuan Direktur (literally Mr Director) is a 1939 novel by the Indonesian Muslim cleric and writer Haji Abdul Malik Karim Amrullah (Hamka). Originally published as a serial in Hamka's newspaper Pedoman Masjarakat, it follows a man from Banjarmasin who goes to Surabaya, becomes rich, but ultimately is driven to insanity. The novel has been seen as a critique of materialism, arrogance, and superstition.

== Plot ==
Tuan Direktur presents a chronological plot, divided into twelve chapters. It follows Jazuli, who leaves his hometown of Banjarmasin to go to Surabaya in Java and become a gold merchant. He is quickly able to earn great wealth. However, this causes the once devout and humble Jazuli to become arrogant and materialistic. He calls himself "Tuan Direktur" and surrounds himself with sycophants Kadri, Margono, and Hajji Salmi. He tries to buy Jasin's land to build a factory, but is refused.

Kadri uses Jazuli's belief in spirits to control him, manipulating his boss to fire numerous employees – including Fauzi, who is able to become a successful businessman with Jasin's help. In an effort to eliminate Jasin, Kadri calls the police to the latter's house, claiming that Jasin is holding clandestine, anti-government meetings. When the police come, Jazuli, who has come to Jasin's house to try to buy the land, is arrested with a number of other people.

After two days in holding, Jazuli is released but unable to enjoy his former arrogance, having been counselled by Jasin while in jail. When he sees Fauzi become a rich yet humble man, Jazuli is sent into a depression. He falls ill and does not recover, while Jasin and Fauzi live happily.

== Writing ==
Haji Abdul Malik Karim Amrullah, better known as simply Hamka, was the Sumatran-born son of a devout Muslim who viewed local traditions as hindering the progress of religion – his father's opinions influenced his. After becoming a scholar of Islam, he travelled often, including to Java. Tuan Direktur reflected Hamka's Islamic worldview and was likely derived in part from his experiences while travelling.

At the time Tuan Direktur was written, Surabaya was one of the richer cities in the Dutch East Indies, serving as both a port into the colony and as a stopping point for trade traffic headed to Australia. The city's wealth was decisively contrasted with the fate of the lower classes, who were not benefited by this trade. Writing for the Indonesian Department of Education and Culture, Putri Minerva Mutiara, Erli Yetti, and Veni Mulyani wrote that this may have influenced Hamka to set his story in the city.

== Themes ==
Mutiara, Yetti, and Mulyani found that Tuan Direktur contrasted the arrogant Jazuli, referred to in the title as "Mr Director", with the more humble Jasin. Jasin spends more time praying as he becomes richer, and is willing to aid another man in entering business. His access to wealth, in their opinion, brings him closer to Allah. Thus, they surmise that the novel's moral is that an arrogant person will find sorrow, but one who is humble and prays to God will find happiness.

Abdul Rahman Abdul Aziz, writing in 2009 on Hamka's Islamic interpretations, notes several aspects of Islamic teaching which are reflected in Tuan Direktur. He wrote that the novel reflected Islamic values of simplicity as a way to overcome lust, warning that, although hard work is necessary, one should not become focused on collecting wealth. Aziz, citing a passage where Jasin tells another man to sell an expensive shirt and use the money to buy shirts for less wealthy persons, further found that the novel reflected a concept of brotherhood; humans are meant to work together to overcome difficulty and not focus on their own needs. Likewise, material wealth should not be considered as important as a wealth of friends and acquaintances. A final point he identifies in the novel is that one living in the modern era should not hold superstitions.

== Release ==
Tuan Direktur was first published as a serial (roman picisan) in Hamka's newspaper Pedoman Masjarakat before being picked up by the colony's state publisher, Balai Pustaka, in 1939. By 1998 it had seen four printings in Indonesia and a Malaysian translation.

The Dutch scholar of Indonesian literature A. Teeuw wrote that Tuan Direktur was an interesting book, but Hamka could not be considered a serious writer owing to the weak and overly moralistic psychology presented in his books.

== Works cited ==
- Aziz, Abdul Rahman Abdul (2009). "Nilai Mencapai Kehidupan Sejahtera: Pandangan Hamka" [Values for Reaching a Prosperous Life: Hamka's View]. Malim (in Malay) (10). Kuala Lumpur: 123–144.
- Mutiara, Putri Minerva; Yetti, Erli; Mulyani, Veni (1998). Analisis Struktur Novel Indonesia Modern, 1930-1939 [Structural Analysis of Modern Indonesian Novels, 1930-1939] (in Indonesian). Jakarta: Department of Education and Culture. ISBN 978-979-459-900-6.
- Oshikawa, Noriaki (1990). "Patjar Merah Indonesia and Tan Malaka: A Popular Novel and a Revolutionary Legend". Reading Southeast Asia: Translation of Contemporary Japanese Scholarship on Southeast Asia. Ithaca: Cornell University Press. pp. 9–41. ISBN 9780877274001.
- Siregar, Bakri (1964). Sedjarah Sastera Indonesia [History of Indonesian Literature]. Vol. 1. Jakarta: Akademi Sastera dan Bahasa "Multatuli". OCLC 63841626.
- Teeuw, A. (1980). Sastra Baru Indonesia [New Indonesian Literature] (in Indonesian). Vol. 1. Ende: Nusa Indah. OCLC 222168801.
