= Under the Protection of Ka'Bah (film) =

2011 film

- Theatrical poster
- Indonesian: Di Bawah Lindungan Ka'bah
- Directed by: Hanny Saputra
- Written by: Titien Wattimena
- Based on: Di Bawah Lindungan Ka'bah by Hamka
- Produced by: Dhamoo Punjabi; Manoj Punjabi
- Starring: Herjunot Ali; Laudya Cynthia Bella; Niken Anjani; Tarra Budiman; Jenny Rachman; Widyawati; Didi Petet; Leroy Osmani; Ajun Perwira; Ike Muti
- Production company: MD Pictures
- Distributed by: MD Entertainment
- Release date: 16 August 2011
- Running time: 110 minutes
- Country: Indonesia
- Language: Indonesian
- Budget: Rp 25 billion

Under the Protection of Ka'Bah (Indonesian: Di Bawah Lindungan Ka'bah) is a 2011 Indonesian teen drama film directed by Hanny Saputra based on the 1938 novel of the same name by writer Hamka. The film was selected as the Indonesian entry for the Best Foreign Language Film at the 84th Academy Awards.

== Plot ==
Hamid (Herjunot Ali) and Zainab (Laudya Cynthia Bella) are teenagers from different social classes; Hamid comes from the lower classes, while Zainab is the daughter of local nobility. Hamid's mother works for Zainab's family, and Hamid has his schooling paid for by Zainab's family. Eventually they fall in love; however, Hamid's mother warns him that they will never be successful.

After Hamid is accused of touching Zainab inappropriately, Hamid runs out from Padang, eventually reaching Mecca and praying at the Kaaba. Zainab is betrothed to the son of another nobleman. However, they continue to love each other. After their deaths, they are reunited in heaven.

== Cast ==
- Herjunot Ali as Hamid
- Laudya Cynthia Bella as Zainab
- Niken Anjani as Rosna
- Tarra Budiman as Saleh
- Jenny Rachman as Hamid's mother
- Widyawati as Mrs. Ja'far
- Didi Petet as Haji Ja'far
- Leroy Osmani as Rustam
- Ajun Perwira as Arifin
- Chris Radford as Mandur Belanda #1

== Production ==
Di Bawah Lindungan Ka'bah is the second film adaptation of Hamka's novel Di Bawah Lindungan Ka'bah, following an adaptation in 1977 by Asrul Sani. Unlike the original novel, which included numerous flashbacks, the plot is chronological.

The film cost Rp 25 billion (approximately US$2.9 million) to make. According to producer Manoj Punjabi, the company spent enough on costumes alone to entirely finance a horror movie. Another cost was the construction of a small mosque, which was made in the style of the 1920s and eventually donated to the locals after filming.

Production took place over a period of three years, beginning in April 2008. After the previous director departed two years into production, Hanny Saputra was approached to finish the film. At the time, approximately 20% had been finished.

== Themes ==
According to Saputra, Di Bawah Lindungan Ka'bah is a romance with bits touching on the themes of culture and religion. Makbul Mubarak, in a review for The Jakarta Post, noted that the film abandoned some of the novel's themes, including feminism.

== Release and reception ==
Di Bawah Lindungan Ka'bah received a wide release on 18 August 2011. Critical reception was negative to mixed.

Mubarak criticized Saputra's lack of historical accuracy, blatant product placements, and straying from the source material, surmising that Saputra had "use[d] only the novel's opening and closing". Some characters, introduced via adaptation, were criticized as being "bland". In summary, he wrote that although the film was not necessarily bad, the city of Padang was "the only solid character". Ekky Imanjaya, writing for Detik.com, wrote that the product placement was overdone and that the lead Hamid seemed weak, instead of the intended patient; he summarized by saying that Di Bawah Lindungan Ka'bah, like Punjabi's earlier production Ayat-Ayat Cinta, was overly commercialized.

Puput Puji Lestari, writing for KapanLagi.com, also noted the lack of attention to historical detail and use of product placement and considered it distracting. However, she summarized that it did not detract from the mood of the film or the quality of the acting by Pepet and Rachman.

The film was Indonesia's submission to the 84th Academy Awards for Best Foreign Language Film, but it did not make the final shortlist.

== See also ==
- List of submissions to the 84th Academy Awards for Best Foreign Language Film
- List of Indonesian submissions for the Academy Award for Best Foreign Language Film
