= Abdul Rozak Fachruddin =

Indonesian Islamic religious leader

K.H. Abdul Rozak Fachruddin

Chairman of Muhammadiyah
- In office 1968–1990
- Preceded by: Faqih Usman
- Succeeded by: Azhar Basyir

Personal details
- Born: February 14, 1916 Pakualaman, Yogyakarta
- Died: 17 March 1995 (aged 79) Surakarta, Central Java
- Citizenship: Indonesian

Abdul Rozak Fachruddin (February 14, 1916 – March 17, 1995) was an Indonesian Islamic religious leader, who served as the 10th chairman of the Islamic mass organization Muhammadiyah from 1968 to 1990.

== Early life ==
Fachruddin was born in Pakualaman, Yogyakarta on February 14, 1916. His father, Fachruddin, was a kyai and the village headman of Pakualaman, appointed by the grandfather of the ruler Paku Alam VIII. Her mother was Maimunah bint Idris from Pakualaman as well. During his childhood age, he studied at the Muhammadiyah schools, which is an Islamic seminary operated under the Muhammadiyah direction. In 1923, for the first time, Fachruddin went to a formal school at Standaard School Muhammadiyah Bausasran. After his father was dismissed from the headman office and his batik business also declined, he returned to Bleberan. In 1925, he moved to the Muhammadiyah Primary School of Kotagede, and from there in 1928 he entered Madrasah Muallimin Muhammadiyah Yogyakarta. After studying at Muallimin, he went home to study with some kyais including his father.

In 1934, he was sent by Muhammadiyah for missionary missions as a teacher in ten schools and as a preacher in Talang Balai (today's Ogan Komering Ilir Regency) for ten years. When Japanese occupational forces came, he moved to Muara Meranjat in Palembang until 1944. During this time, Fachruddin taught at the Muhammadiyah school there led and coached by Hizbul Wathan before returning home.

== Career ==
In 1944, he entered BKR Hezbollah for a year. Upon returning from Palembang and the beginning of preaching in Bleberan, he became a village official in Galur for a year as well. Subsequently, he became an employee of the Department of Religion. In 1950, he moved to Kauman and studied under the early Muhammadiyah figures and kyais such as Bagus Hadikusumo, Basyir Mahfudz, Badilah Zuber, and Ahmad Badawi. It is considered that his devotion is not only within Muhammadiyah however, but also in the government and universities. Later he served as the head of the Ministry of Religious Affairs. Not long after his post, he joined the guerrilla against the Dutch. During 1950–1959, he became an employee at the Yogyakarta Religious Bureau office, then moved to Semarang, during which he was known as an extraordinary lecturer in Islamic studies at Sultan Agung Islamic University.

=== Muhammadiyah ===
Within the rank of Muhammadiyah, he started as the leader of the Muhammadiyah Youth during 1938–1941. He became a leader starting at the branch level, then territorial and provincial, until the central executive level. Fachruddin was elected as the chairman At the 38th Muhammadiyah Congress 1968 in Ujungpandang. Fachruddin's position as the chairman of Muhammadiyah was succeeding Faqih Usman after his death. Subsequently, he served as the top leader of the organization for almost a quarter of the 20th century, before being replaced by the late Azhar Basyir. After being admitted to the Jakarta Islamic Hospital, Fachruddin died on March 17, 1995, leaving seven sons and daughters.
