= Hamka =

Indonesian journalist and activist (1908–1981)

Buya Hamka
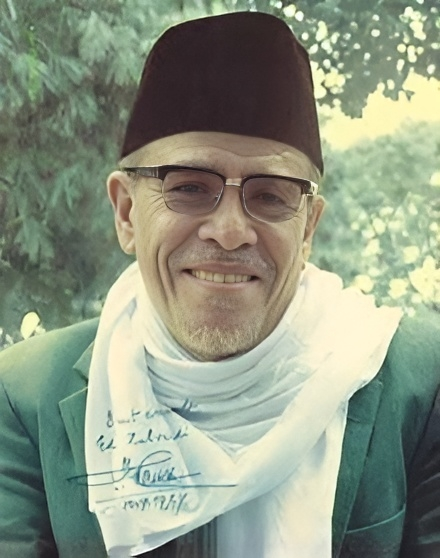
- Portrait of Hamka
- Born: Abdul Malik; 17 February 1908; Agam, West Sumatra, Dutch East Indies
- Died: 24 July 1981 (aged 73); Jakarta, Indonesia
- Other name: Haji Abdul Malik Karim Amrullah

Philosophical work
- Main interests: Al-Qur'an Exegesis, Islamic law, Islamic history, tasawuf, and literature
- Notable works: Al-Azhar Exegesis; Tenggelamnya Kapal van der Wijck; Di Bawah Lindungan Ka'bah

Abdul Malik Karim Amrullah, better known by his pen name Hamka or Buya Hamka (17 February 1908 – 24 July 1981), was an Indonesian ʿālim, philosopher, writer, novelist, lecturer, politician and journalist.

First affiliated with the Masyumi Party, until it was disbanded due to connection to the PRRI rebellion, Hamka was jailed because he was close to other PRRI members. He also served as the inaugural chief cleric of the Indonesian Ulema Council, and was active in Muhammadiyah until he died. Al-Azhar University and Malaysian National University both granted him honorary doctorates, while Moestopo University of Jakarta appointed him a Distinguished Professor.

Hamka is further honoured by being the namesake of Hamka Muhammadiyah University in Jakarta, and is named an Indonesian National Hero.

== Early life ==
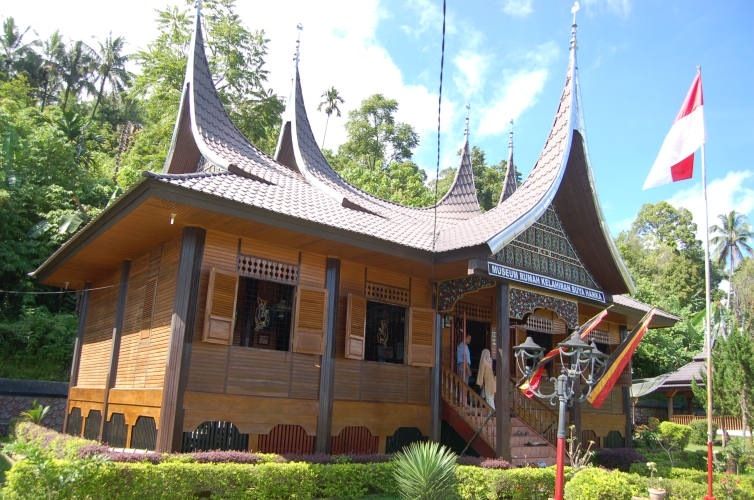
Hamka's and his grandmother's residence during his childhood in Maninjau, it was renovated in 2001 and named the Buya Hamka Birthplace Museum. The museum now holds most of his books, publications, and related goods.

Hamka was born on 17 February 1908 in Agam, West Sumatra, the eldest of four siblings. Raised in a family of devout Muslims, his father was Abdul Karim Amrullah, a clerical reformer of Islam in Minangkabau, also known as "Haji Rasul". His mother, Sitti Shafiyah, came from a lineage of Minangkabau artists. His paternal grandfather, Muhammad Amrullah, was a member of the Naqshbandiyah. Hamka had a younger brother, Abdul Wadud Karim Amrullah, whose child is the American drag performer and winner of the third season of RuPaul's Drag Race, Raja Gemini.

Prior to his formal education, Hamka lived with his grandmother in a house south of Maninjau. When he was four years old, Hamka and his family moved to Padang Panjang, where he learned to read the Qur'an and recite prayers under the guidance of his half-sister Fatimah. At the age of seven, Malik entered the Village School. In 1916, Zainuddin Labay El Yunusy opened a religious school, Diniyah School, replacing the traditional surau-based education system. While attending lessons every morning at the Village School, Malik took afternoon classes at Diniyah School where he quickly learned Arabic.

=== Education ===
In 1918, Hamka left the Village School after three years, because he wanted to emphasize religious education, and his father registered him in a Thawalib. The school required its students to memorize classical books, rules regarding nahwu, and neuroscience. After studying at Diniyah School every morning, Malik attended Thawalib classes in the afternoon and returned to the surau in the evening. Most of the Thawalib's students were teenagers who were older than Hamka because of the heavy material that was needed to be memorized. From the lessons he attended, he was only interested in the arudh lessons which discussed poetry in Arabic. Although his activities from morning to evening were filled with learning, he was known to be a troublemaker, annoying his friends and cutting class to watch movies at a theater.

When he was 12 years old, Hamka's parents divorced, because although his father was a devout religious Muslim, his mother's relatives still practiced traditional practices that did not comply with Islamic teachings. The first few days after his parents divorced, Hamka did not go to school. He instead spent time traveling around Padang Panjang. Hamka had been absent for fifteen days in a row until a teacher at the Thawalib came to the house to check up on him. Finding out Hamka was absent, his father got angry and hit him.

Because of fear of his father, Hamka returned to the class as usual. After he discovered that his teacher, Zainuddin Labay El Yunusy, had opened a book rental library, Hamka spent most of his time reading through borrowed books. He read literary works published by Balai Pustaka, Chinese stories, and Arabic translations. After reading, Malik copied his own version. Running out of money to rent the books, Hamka offered to work for a printing house owned by Bagindo Sinaro, where the book collection were covered with protective cardboard. He helped cut cardboard, make glue dough as a glue for books, and make coffee, but as a reward, he asks to be allowed to read the collection of books that were to be rented out. Within three hours of returning from Diniyah before leaving for Thawalib, Hamka arranged his time to have time to read. Because of his neat work, he was allowed to bring a new book that had not been cardboard to work on at home. However, since Malik was often caught reading story books, his father reprimanded him, so every time he noticed his father was watching, Hamka would put down the story book he was reading, took a religious book while pretending to read it. Family problems caused Hamka to often travel long distances alone. He would leave his classes at Diniyah and Thawalib, and travels to Maninjau to visit his mother. Hamka was conflicted about choosing to live with his mother or father. Hamka sought association with the young people of Maninjau. He studied silat and randai, as well as listening to kaba, stories sung with traditional Minangkabau musical instruments. He walked further to Bukittinggi and Payakumbuh, briefly hanging out at cockfights and horse racing jockeys. He was neglected for almost a year until when he was 14 years old, his father felt restless and took him to go recite the Koran to the cleric Sheikh Ibrahim Musa in Parabek, about five kilometers from Bukittinggi. In Parabek, for the first time Hamka lived independently.

In Parabek, young Hamka learnt to fulfill his daily needs as a santri. During his stay at the pesantren, Hamka took advantage of the freed Saturday to go out to the surrounding the villages near Parabek. Interested in hearing traditional speeches, Hamka often attended the inauguration of the penghulu, when the traditional elders gathered. He noted down while memorizing rhymes and dictated passages in the traditional speeches he heard.

=== Moving to Java ===
Hamka travelled all over Minangkabau as a teenager, gaining the nickname Si Bujang Jauh, (the Boy from Afar) from his father.

Hamka decided to leave for Java at the age of 15, when he learnt that the Islam taught there was far more advanced in terms of structure and organisation. He ran away from home, unnoticed by his father and only said goodbye to his grandmother in Maninjau. From Maninjau, Malik started his journey with the money his grandmother gave him, In Bengkulu, he planned to meet a relative from his mother's tribe to ask for additional fees, however, he contracted smallpox. He tried to continue but was forced to go back to Meninjau where he spent two-months bedridden. He departed to Java again in July 1924, after spending two months bedridden.

After arriving in Java he went to Yogyakarta and studied under Bagoes Hadikoesoemo, Oemar Said Tjokroaminoto, Abdul Rozak Fachruddin, and Suryopranoto; under Bagoes Hadikoesoemo, Hamka joined Sarekat Islam. Before returning to Minangkabau, he visited Bandung and met with Masjumi leaders Ahmad Hassan and Mohammad Natsir, which gave him the opportunity to write in the magazine Pembela Islam ("Defenders of Islam"). Subsequently, in 1925, he went to Pekalongan, Central Java to meet Ahmad Rasyid Sutan Mansur, who was the chairman of Muhammadiyah's Pekalongan branch, and learnt more about Islam from him. While in Pekalongan, he stayed at his brother's house and started giving religious talks for Muhammadiyah.

In Pekalongan, Hamka met his father who failed to leave for Egypt after the postponement of the International Caliphate Congress. Muhammadiyah activities attracted Haji Rasul's attention so that when he returned to Minangkabau with Jafar Amrullah and Marah Intan, Haji Rasul initiated the establishment of a Muhammadiyah branch at Batang River. The association that was founded earlier called Sendi Aman changed its name to Muhammadiyah to be recognized as a branch by Muhammadiyah in Yogyakarta. From there, Muhammadiyah spread throughout the Minangkabau area with the help of its former students. In order to prepare Muhammadiyah preachers and teachers, Haji Rasul encouraged Thawalib students to open a Muhammadiyah Tablighi in Sungai Batang. Malik led the speech practice held by the course once a week. He made speeches for those who were not good at composing. His speeches were published in the magazine, Khatibul Ummah, which started with a circulation of 500 copies. Malik completed and edited portions of the speech he received before publication. His teacher Zainuddin and the owner of the printing press, Bagindo Sinaro, helped produce and distribute the magazine. From writing and editing speeches, Malik began to learn and express his writing skills. However, due to financial reasons, the printing of Khatibul Ummah only lasted three issues.

After his first trip in Java, he claimed to have a new spirit in studying Islam. He also saw no difference between Islamic reformation missions in both the Minangkabau and Javan regions: the reformation in Minangkabau aimed at purifying Islam off regressive practices of imitation and superstition, while the Javan movement was more focused to the efforts of combating "backwardness", ignorance and poverty.

=== Performing the Hajj ===
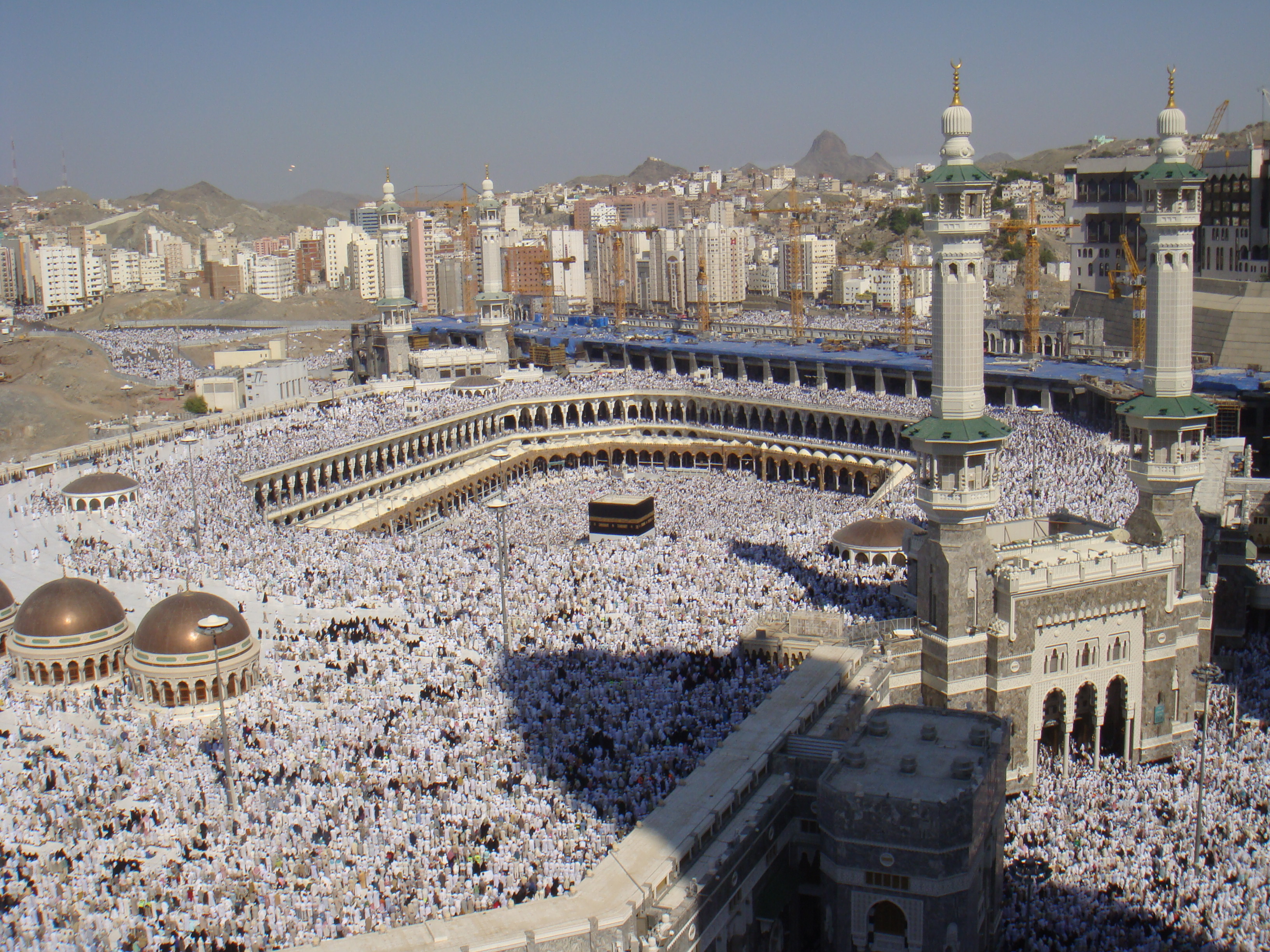
Hamka's trip to Mecca in 1927 inspired him to write Di Bawah Lindungan Ka'bah.

In February 1927, he made the decision to go to Mecca to expand his religious knowledge, including learning the Arabic language and performing his first hajj pilgrimage. He left without saying goodbye to his father, using his own money he departed from Belawan Harbor for Jeddah. While in Mecca, he became correspondent for the daily "Andalas Light" (Pelita Andalas) and also worked at a printing company owned by Hamid, son of Majid Kurdish, Ahmad Khatib al-Minangkabawi's father-in-law. His mastery of Arabic enabled him to read classic Islamic kitab, books, and Islamic newsletters.

During the pilgrimage, Hamka and several other pilgrims candidate founded the East Indian Association (Persatuan Hindia Timur), an organisation giving lessons to Dutch Indies pilgrims-to-be. He lived in Mecca for some time after the pilgrimage, where he met Agus Salim and had expressed his desire to settle in Mecca, but Agus Salim instead advised him to go home reasoning: "You can do a lot more work with your study and movements that you are fighting for. Therefore, it would be better to develop yourself in your own homeland". Hamka soon returned home after seven months of living in Mecca. However, instead of going back to Padang Panjang, Hamka settled in the city of Medan, where his returning ship had anchored.

=== Career in Medan ===
While in Medan, he wrote many articles for various magazines and had become a religious teacher for several months in Tebing Tinggi. He sent his writings to the newspaper Pembela Islam in Bandung and Voice of Muhammadiyah, which was led by Abdul Rozak Fachruddin, in Yogyakarta. In addition, he also worked as a correspondent for the daily paper Pelita Andalas and wrote trip reports, especially about his journey to Mecca in 1927. In 1928, he wrote the first story in Minangkabau titled Sabariyah. In the same year, he was appointed as editor of the "Progress Era" (Kemajuan Zaman) magazine, which was based on the results of the Muhammadiyah conference in Padang Panjang. The next year, he wrote several books, However, some of his writings were confiscated because they were considered as seditious by the Dutch colonial government.

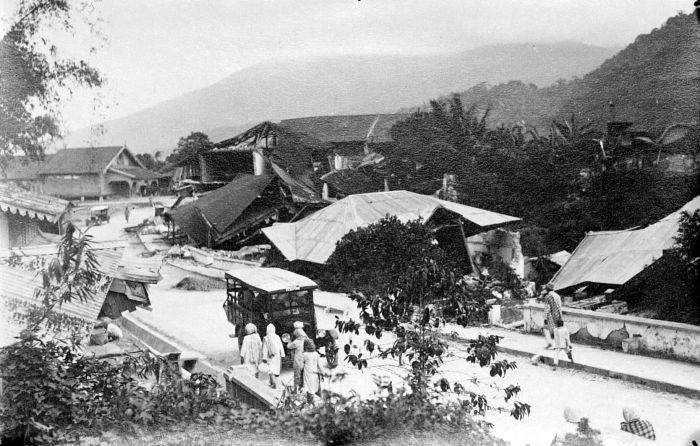
On 28 June 1926, earthquake measuring 7.6 RS destroyed most of Padang Panjang, including houses in Gatangan Hamka's father's

When in the field, the people in the village had repeatedly asked him to send some letters home, yet he declined. This worried his father, who asked Sutan Mansur Ahmad Rashid to pick him up and persuade him to go home. Sutan's plea finally convinced Malik to return to his hometown in Maninjau, which at the time was in ruins due to the 1926 earthquake, including his father's home in Padang Panjang Lantah. Arriving at his hometown, he finally met his father and was overcome with emotions. His father was shocked to learn that he journeyed to Hajj on his own and paid with his own money, saying "Why don't you let me know about this noble and sacred mean? I was poor and on hard times at the time." His realization of his father's honest concern for him changed his view of his father.

After about a year settling in Sungai Batang, Abdul Malik left his hometown again to go to Medan in 1936. During his time in Medan, he worked as an editor and became editor-in-chief of a magazine Pedoman Masyarakat, which he founded with Islamic cleric M. Yunan Nasution. Through Pedoman Masyarakat, he used the penname "Hamka" for the first time. While in Medan, he wrote Di Bawah Lindungan Ka'bah, which was inspired by his trip to Mecca in 1927. After the novel was published in 1938, he wrote Sinking of the van der Wijck, which was written as a serialised story in Pedoman Masyarakat. In addition, he also published several novels and books such as: Merantau ke Deli ("Going Away to Deli"), Kedudukan Perempuan dalam Islam ("Women's Position in Islam"), Tuan Direktur ("The Director"), New Forces, Driven, In The Valley of Life, Father, Modern Mysticism, and Falsafah Hidup ("Life Philosophy"). The parent magazine for Pedoman was shut down in 1943 during the Japanese occupation of the Dutch East Indies.

During the Japanese occupation, Hamka was appointed as a religious adviser to the Japanese. He was also a member of a makeshift assembly that handled government and Islamic matters in 1944. He accepted this position believing the Japanese promise to grant independence to Indonesia. But after occupying this position, he was regarded as a collaborator with the Japanese by his friends. He was subjected to endless criticism as the Japanese were defeated and surrendered to the Allies, which drove him back to the Minangkabau after the Indonesian Revolution broke out in 1945, joining Indonesian guerrillas to fight against the return of the Dutch in the jungles of Medan.

== Career and later life ==
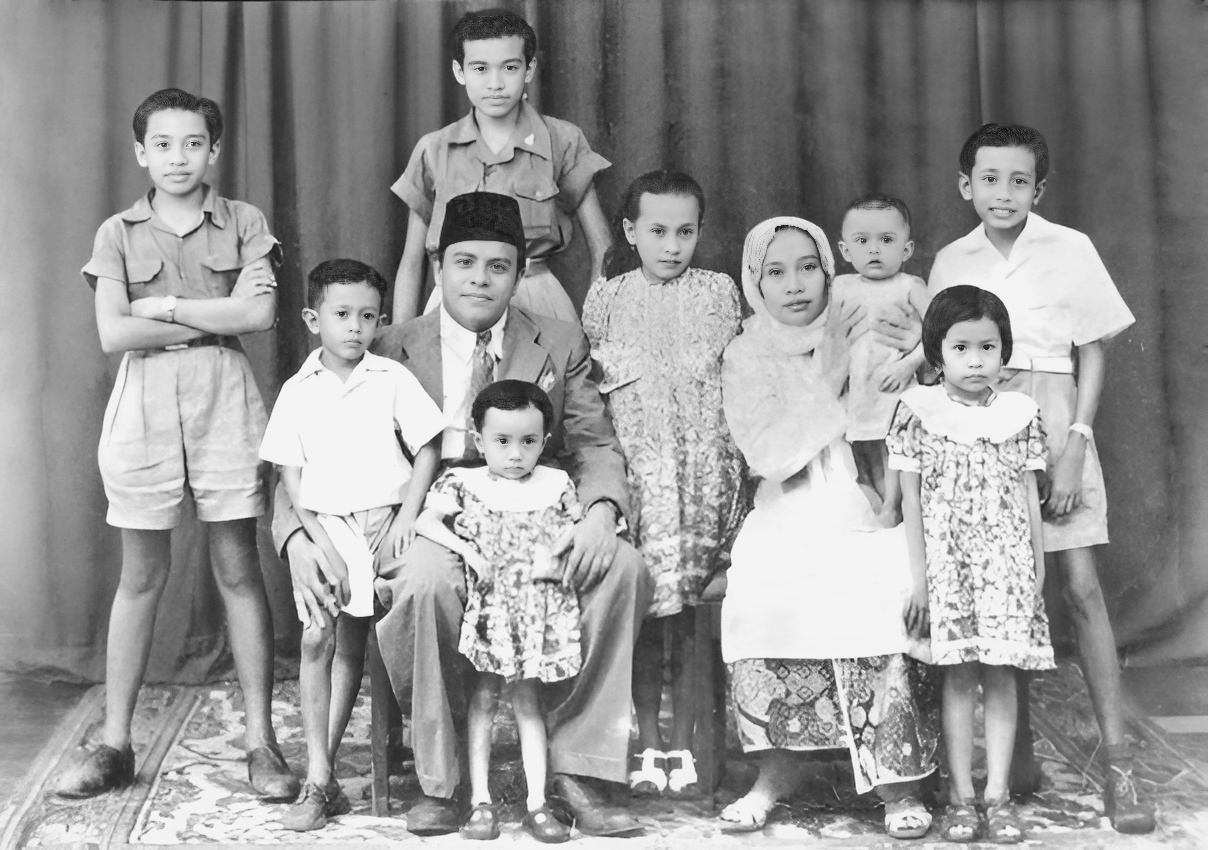
Hamka with his family

After his marriage to Siti Raham, Hamka's Muhammadiyah branch was active in Minangkabau, whose origin stemmed from the association Joints bakalnya Safe founded by his father in 1925 in Batang River. In addition, he became the head of Tablighi School, a religious school founded by the Muhammadiyah on 1 January 1930.

After attending the congress of Muhammadiyah in Solo in 1928, Hamka never missed attending congresses of Muhammadiyah. Upon his return from Solo, he began to assume various positions, until finally he was appointed as Chairman of the Muhammadiyah branch at Padang Panjang. After the 19th Muhammadiyah Congress in Bukittinggi in 1930, followed by the next congress in Yogyakarta, he met an invitation to set up a branch of the Muhammadiyah in Bengkalis, Central Sumatra. He later appointed Muhammad Rasami as secretary of the Muhammadiyah Bengkalis Branch Management. Subsequently, in 1932, he was sent by the Muhammadiyah to Makassar to prepare for the 21st Muhammadiyah Congress. While in Makassar, he had published Al-Mahdi, a monthly Islamic science magazine. In 1934, a year after attending a congress of Muhammadiyah in Semarang, he was made a permanent member of the Muhammadiyah Council for the region of Central Sumatra.

Hamka had an increasingly uphill career when he moved to Medan. In 1942, along with the fall of the Dutch East Indies to the Japanese Empire, Hamka was elected as leader of East Sumatra's Muhammadiyah branch to replace H. Mohammad Said. But in December 1945, he decided to return to the Minangkabau and to resign from the position. The following year, he was elected Chairman of the Assembly of West Sumatra Muhammadiyah leaders replacing S.Y. Sutan Mangkuto, holding this position until 1949.

In 1953, he was elected as the leader of the central Muhammadyiah Council at the 32nd Muhammadiyah Congress at Purwokerto, holding the position until 1971, although he was still appointed as an adviser to the central leadership of Muhammadiyah until the end of his life .

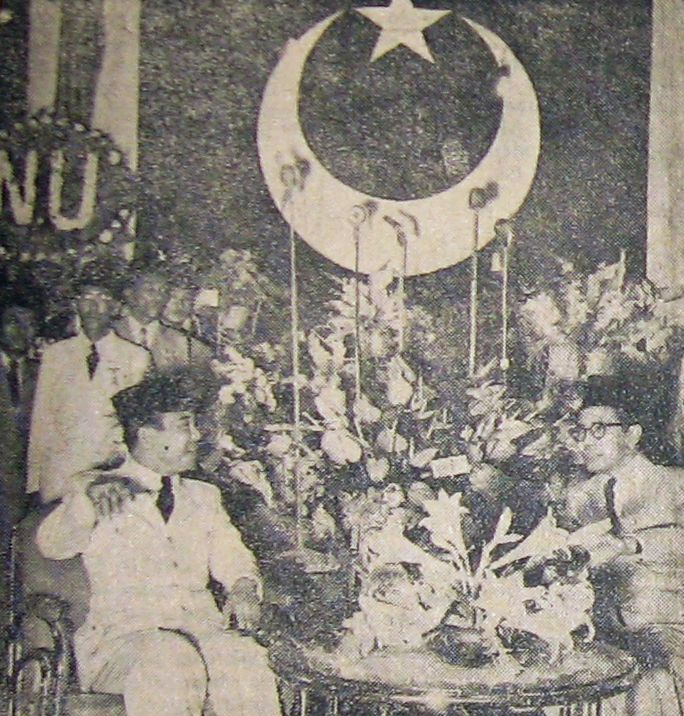
Hamka was imprisoned by Sukarno, because he refused to condemn his party members joining in the PRRI rebellion against the state.

In 1962, as senior member of the Masyumi Party which was disbanded due to connection to PRRI rebellion, Hamka was jailed two years because he refused to condemn his party members' involvement in the rebellion against the state that was supported by a number of Masyumi leaders.

In 1973, he testified in support of Vivian Rubiyanti Iskandar's petition before the West Jakarta District Court for legal recognition of her gender, saying that "[her desire to transition] does not run contrary to Allah's law, but in keeping with the teachings of Islam, which holds good will to all in high esteem".

== Death ==
Hamka's health started to decline after his resignation as chairman of MUI. Following the advice of Hamka's family doctor, doctor Karnen Bratawijaya, Hamka was hospitalized at Pertamina Central Hospital on 18 July 1981. On the sixth day of treatment, Hamka had time to perform the Duha prayer with the help of his daughter, Azizah, for tayammum. That afternoon, several doctors came to check his condition, stating that he was in a coma. The team of doctors stated that his kidneys, lungs, and central nervous system were no longer functioning, and his condition could only be maintained with a pacemaker. At ten o'clock the next morning, the children agreed to remove the pacemaker, and not long after that Hamka died.

Hamka died on Friday, 24 July 1981 at 10:37 WIB at the age of 73. His body was buried at his home on Jalan Raden Fatah III. Among the people who attended to pay their last respects were President Suharto and Vice President Adam Malik, State Minister for the Environment Emil Salim, and Minister of Transportation Azwar Anas who served as imam for the funeral prayer. Hamka's body was taken to the Al-Azhar Grand Mosque and prayed for again, before being buried in the Tanah Kusir Public Cemetery, South Jakarta, led by the Minister of Religion Alamsyah Ratu Perwiranegara.

After Hamka's death, the government awarded the Mahaputra Utama Star posthumously to Hamka. Since 2011, he has been declared a National Hero of Indonesia. In 2016, the Indonesian Ulema Council started production on a movie about Hamka's life, titled Buya Hamka.

== Bibliography ==
A prolific writer, apart from his magnum opus, the thirty-volumes Qur'anic commentary called Tafsir Al-Azhar, he was known to have written "over 100 books, ranging from philosophy, politics, Minangkabau adat, history and biography, Islamic doctrine, ethics, mysticism, tafsir, and fiction."

1. Khatibul Ummah - written in Arabic.
2. Pembela Islam ("Defender of Islam") - 1929
3. Ringkasan Tarikh Ummat Islam (" (1929).
4. Kepentingan Melakukan Tabligh ("The Importance of the Tabligh") - 1929
5. Tasawuf Modern ("The Modern Tasawuf") - 1939
6. Hikmat Isra' dan Mikraj
7. Di Bawah Lindungan Ka'bah ("Beneath the Aegis of the Ka'bah") - 1938
8. Tenggelamnya Kapal van der Wijck ("The Sinking of the van der Wijck") - 1938
9. Tuan Direktur ("Mister Director") - 1939
10. Merantau ke Deli ("Bound for Deli") - 1940
11. Revolusi Agama ("The Revolution of Religion") - 1946
12. Mandi Cahaya di Tanah Suci ("Bathing in the Light of the Holy Land") - 1950
13. Mengembara di Lembah Nil ("Sojourning in the Nile Valley") - 1950
14. Ditepi Sungai Dajlah ("On the Banks of the River Tigris) - 1950
15. Kenangan-Kenangan Hidup ("Memoirs") - 1950
16. Sejarah Ummat Islam ("The History of the Muslims")
17. 1001 Soal Hidup ("1001 Questions About Life") - 1950
18. Pelajaran Agama Islam ("Lessons in Islam") - 1956
19. Sayid Jamaluddin Al-Afghani - 1965
20. Ekspansi Ideologi ("The Expansion of Ideology") - 1963
21. Hak Asasi Manusia Dipandang dari Segi Islam ("Human Rights from a Muslim Perspective") - 1968
22. Falsafah Ideologi Islam ("Tenets of Islamic Ideology") - 1950
23. Keadilan Sosial Dalam Islam ("Social Justice in Islam") - 1950
24. Studi Islam ("Islamic Studies") - 1973
25. Himpunan Khutbah-Khutbah.
26. Muhammadiyah di Minangkabau ("Muhammadiyah in Minangkabau") (1975).
27. Pandangan Hidup Muslim (1960).
28. Kedudukan Perempuan dalam Islam ("The Status of Women in Islam") - 1973
29. Tafsir Al-Azhar
30. Falsafah hidup
31. Falsafah ketuhanan
