= Japanese occupation of West Sumatra =

1942–1945 Japanese rule in West Sumatra

West Coast Province of Sumatra スマトラ西海岸州 (Japanese) Sumatora Nishikaigan-shū
- 1942–1945
- Flag Imperial Seal
- Motto: 八紘一宇 ("Hakkō Ichiu") "Eight Crown Cords, One Roof"
- Anthem: 君が代 ("Kimigayo") "His Majesty's Reign"
- West Coast Sumatra (dark red) within the Japanese occupation of the Dutch East Indies (red)
- Status: Province of the Japanese occupied Sumatra
- Capital and largest city: Padang; 1°00′S 100°30′E
- Common languages: Japanese; Indonesian; Dutch; Minangkabau
- Emperor
  - 1942–1945: Hirohito
- Army Commander (Gunshireikan)
  - 1942: Tomoyuki Yamashita
  - 1942‒1943: Yaheita Saito
  - 1943‒1945: Moritake Tanabe
- Governor (Shūchōkan)
  - 1942‒1944: Yano Kenzo
  - 1944‒1945: Hattori Naoaki
- Legislature: Shū Sangi-kai
  - Council of state: Kerukunan Minangkabau
- Historical era: World War II
  - Pacific War begins: 8 December 1941^{a}
  - Invasion of Sumatra: 14 February 1942
  - Dutch captitulation: 8 March 1942
  - Japanese troops land on Padang: 17 March 1942
  - Japanese Civil Administration set up: 9 August 1942
  - Disestablished: 17 August 1945
  - Surrender of Japan: 10 October 1945
- Currency: Netherlands Indian roepiah
- Time zone: UTC+9 (TST)
Preceded by	Succeeded by
Sumatra's West Coast Residency	Indonesia; Dutch East Indies
- Today part of: Indonesia: West Sumatra
- 1. The Pacific War started on 8 December 1941 in Asian time zones, but is often referred to as starting on 7 December, as that was the date in European and American time zones (such as for the attack on Pearl Harbor in the United States' Territory of Hawaii).

Japanese name
- Kanji: スマトラ西海岸州
- Hiragana: すまとらにしかいがんしゅう
- Katakana: スマトラニシカイガンシュウ
- Kyūjitai: スマトラ西海岸州
Transcriptions
- Romanization: Sumatora Nishikaigan-shū
- Kunrei-shiki: Sumatora Nisikaigan-syû

Sumatora Nishi Kaigan Shū (Japanese: スマトラ西海岸州, Hepburn: Sumatora Nishikaigan-shū; lit. 'West Coast Province of Sumatra'), was the administrative designation for West Sumatra during its occupation and governance by the Empire of Japan from 1942 to 1945. Japanese forces entered Padang on 17 March 1942, encountering little resistance as Dutch colonial forces rapidly collapsed. Unlike most occupied territories in Indonesia, the government was headed by a Japanese civilian, rather than someone associated with the Japanese Imperial Army. Governor Yano Kenzo, the only civilian governor in occupied Indonesia, implemented policies aimed at incorporating local elites while advancing Japan's strategic and economic interests.

The early stages of the occupation initially fostered nationalist aspirations, with figures such as Sukarno and Chatib Sulaiman influencing local political developments. However, Japan's exploitative economic policies, forced labor system (rōmusha), and strict military control led to widespread suffering. Thousands of locals were conscripted into the Japanese war effort, with many forced to work on infrastructure projects such as the Muaro–Pekanbaru railway, resulting in high mortality rates. The Giyūgun (Indonesian: Laskar Rakjat; Japanese: 義勇軍, lit. 'Volunteer Army'), the only formal military unit established in West Sumatra, later became a foundation for Indonesia's armed forces following the end of the occupation.

By 1944–1945, as the war turned against Japan, its rule in West Sumatra became increasingly repressive. Allied bombing raids, economic collapse, and growing unrest further weakened Japanese control. The occupation formally ended in stages, beginning with Japan's surrender on August 15, 1945. However, the transition to Indonesian independence in West Sumatra was marked by political maneuvers, the dissolution of Japanese institutions, and the emergence of local resistance against returning Dutch forces.

== Japanese arrival ==
=== Prelude ===
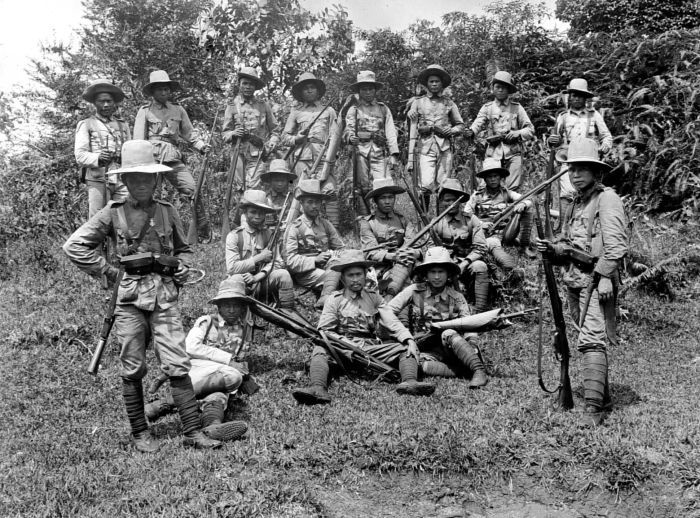
Group of native KNIL infantrymen on Sumatra's West Coast

In December 1941, the Japanese 14th Army, under the command of Vice Admiral Nobutake Kondō, successfully defeated U.S. military forces on Luzon Island, facilitating the Japanese occupation of the Philippines. Concurrently, the Imperial Japanese Navy, with intelligence from the Japanese 25th Army, sank the British battleships Prince of Wales and Repulse in Singaporean waters on December 10, 1941, which dealt a severe blow to British naval strength in Southeast Asia. With no immediate reinforcements, the British Pacific Fleet withdrew to Ceylon, leaving Malaya vulnerable to rapid Japanese advances. This loss also forced Allied forces to scatter across the Dutch East Indies, further weakening their ability to defend the region. Following these operations, the 16th Army, led by Lieutenant General Hitoshi Imamura, and the 25th Army, under the command of General Tomoyuki Yamashita, set their sights on taking control of Indonesia. From intelligence reports, the Netherlands was well aware of Japan's intention to expand its influence to Indonesia. Therefore, the Dutch tried to organize a limited militia, including cadets such as at the Military Academy in Breda into corps of vaandrigs. Sumatra itself hosted the second-largest concentration of Dutch East Indies troops, following Java. The island's defense was overseen by Major General Roelof Overakker, of the Sumatra High Command. Approximately 4,500 Royal Netherlands East Indies Army (KNIL) soldiers, including both garrison and militia forces, were stationed on the island.

The Sumatra High Command was organized into four Territorial Commands: North Sumatra, West Sumatra-Tapanuli, Riau, and South Sumatra. The Territorial Command of West Sumatra and Tapanuli, led by Lieutenant Colonel John H. M. Blogg, managed the defense of the western region of Sumatra. The Dutch stationed one infantry company each in Padang, Emmahaven (Teluk Bayur), Fort de Kock (Bukittinggi), and Sibolga. Additionally, Padangsidimpuan and Tarutung were defended by three infantry sections each. Two infantry companies, supported by a militia company, were assigned to protect Pekanbaru. Key strategic assets defended by these troops included the harbors at Emmahaven and Sibolga, as well as the airfields in Pekanbaru and Padang. To reinforce these defenses, a battery of 75mm cannon was stationed to guard Emmahaven harbor, and an airborne machine gun section was deployed to protect the Pekanbaru airfield. Beyond regular troops, the Dutch deployed a Landstorm company to safeguard critical infrastructure in western Sumatra. A Stadswacht (city watch) company was tasked with guarding Padang, while Bukittinggi, Sawahlunto, and Sibolga each had a section of similar units for defense. Additionally, a mobile first aid detachment operated under this command to support military efforts.

As Japanese forces advanced toward the Indonesian archipelago, Dutch officials in West Sumatra made last-minute efforts to secure local support in defending the colony. The colonial administration had long excluded Indonesians from political participation, creating deep resentment among the local population. In an attempt to shift this sentiment, Charles van der Plas, a member of the Dutch East Indies Council, visited West Sumatra. Fluent in Arabic and well-versed in Islamic teachings, he used Qur'anic verses and Hadiths to persuade local leaders that cooperation with the Dutch was in their best interest. He framed Dutch rule as a protective force against foreign invaders and urged the Minangkabau people to assist in resisting the Japanese advance. However, these appeals were met with widespread skepticism and were largely dismissed by the leaders and populace of West Sumatra, many of whom saw them as hollow attempts to maintain colonial control rather than genuine offers of inclusion. The arrival of Dutch ministers, including Finance Minister Charles Welter and Foreign Minister Eelco van Kleffens, further exposed the administration's unwillingness to enact real reforms. Arriving at Batavia in early 1942 under the Dutch government-in-exile, Van Kleffens publicly claimed that the Dutch East Indies could withstand the Japanese invasion with local support, but his assertion ignored decades of exclusionary policies that had eroded trust in the Dutch government. A failure to engage with the local population eroded trust and reinforced resentment against colonial rule. As a result, when the Japanese landed, the Dutch found themselves isolated and without the local backing they had assumed would materialize. According to a report gathered by spies operating under the F-Kikan banner, the formation of the Tripartite Pact between Japan, Germany, and Italy intensified tensions in the Pacific. In response, the Dutch government introduced a series of wartime legislative measures to mobilize the Indonesian population for defense by 10 May 1940. However, these measures inadvertently fueled widespread resentment among the local populace.

In January 1942, Japanese aircraft attacked the city of Padang. During the first attack, a plane dropped one bomb in front of Padang station, near the railroad workshops. This was the first ever bombing to occur in West Sumatra. The second attack saw seven Japanese planes over the port of Emmahaven. Contemporary Japanese records indicate that the attack on the port took place on January 27 and 28, when Japanese naval aircraft attacked freighters there. According to a Daihon'ei announcement on January 30, a 10,000-ton-class ship was sunk, while three smaller 6,000-ton-class freighters, two 4,000-ton-class vessels, and one 2,000-ton-class freighter were damaged. After circling over the city of Padang, the planes dropped bombs on ships at anchor by the docks, as well as warehouses. As a result, three large ships were sunk, parts of the warehouses and wharves were burned, and the conveyor for loading coal onto ships was damaged.

By February 1942, as part of their preparations for war, the Dutch organized various auxiliary and militia units to support the Royal Netherlands East Indies Army; these included the Stadswacht, Landwacht, and Luchtbeschermingsdienst (LBD), alongside other militia preparations. The Stadswacht was responsible for localized protection in larger towns, focusing on maintaining order and guarding critical areas. Similarly, the Landwacht was established on estates and consisted of estate personnel tasked with defending their properties and, if required, assisting neighboring estates. Additionally, other auxiliary and conscript units were formed, such as the Landstorm, a militia comprising Europeans over the age of 32. Yet these preparations fell short when the Japanese arrived, because the public offered minimal support for forming such units as the Vernielingscorps (intended to carry out a scorched-earth policy), Militieplicht (a militia duty to uphold Dutch control), and the Vrijwillige Hulppolitie (volunteer auxiliary police). Only civil servants under duress showed minimal compliance.

=== Invasion ===
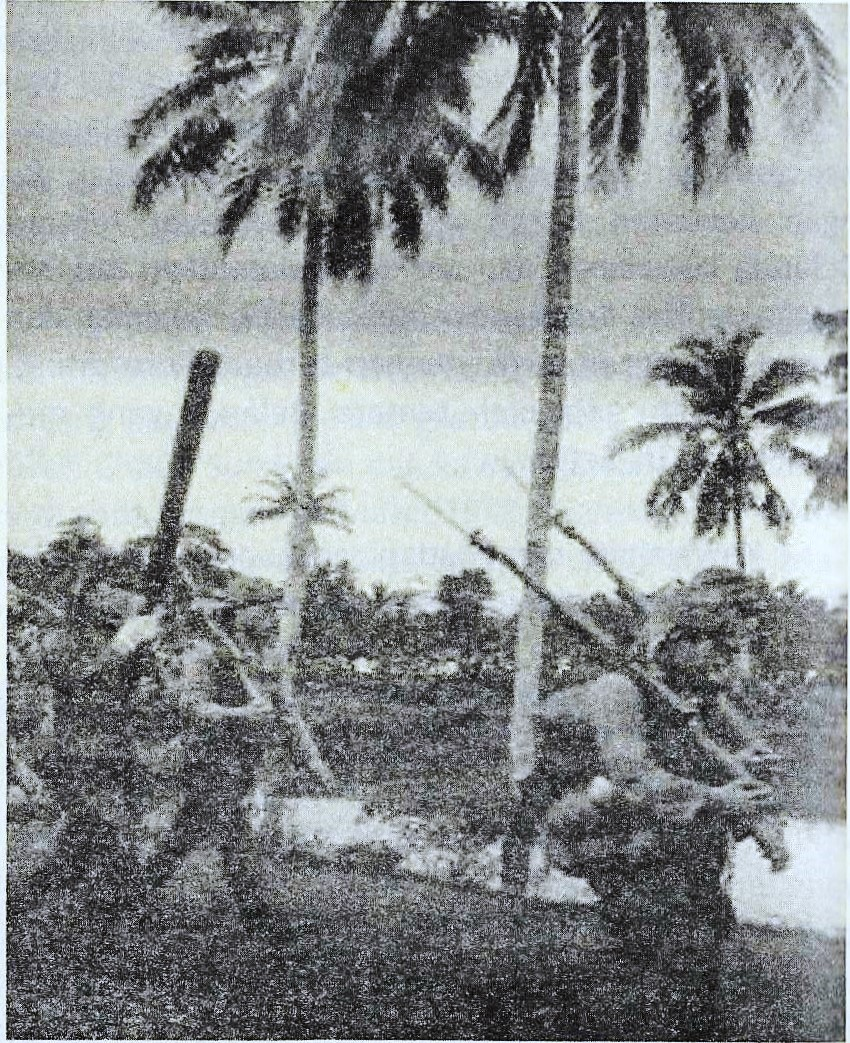
Arrival of Japanese soldiers in West Sumatra (1942)

On 14 February 1942, the Japanese began their invasion of Sumatra by deploying paratroop units in Palembang. According to historian Audrey Kahin, the Japanese intended to preempt Dutch plans to damage oil installations near Palembang. The operation at Palembang involved the 38th Division of the 16th Army. The Japanese subsequently expanded their operations to other parts of Sumatra, with the 2nd Konoe Division operating under the 25th Army. By mid-March, larger numbers of troops had landed on the northern and eastern coasts of Sumatra and were moving rapidly southwards.

On 23 February, reports indicated that a Japanese motorized column of approximately 48 trucks had reached Lahat, while another column of 23 trucks and 7 tanks was advancing westward, possibly toward Bengkulu. In response, the West Sumatra and Tapanuli Territorial Commands prepared to counter the Japanese advance northward. Meanwhile, the KNIL commander in Jambi initiated the withdrawal of scattered troops from Muaratebo, while maintaining defensive positions at Sarolangun.

By 26 February, the Sarolangun detachment was forced to retreat following Japanese action in Bangko, Merangin. While awaiting reinforcements, the detachment was tasked with delaying the Japanese advance around Muarabungo, mobilizing six squads, some drawn from the Mang detachment. Dutch forces destroyed the bridge over the Bungo River, using the river's 100-meter width as a defensive barrier. However, on 28 February, Japanese forces successfully encircled the western flank of the Dutch defenses. Reinforcements dispatched from Jambi arrived too late, and the KNIL troops were ultimately repelled from Muarabungo, retreating to Muaratebo. To protect retreating forces from Central Sumatra, the KNIL command established a defensive perimeter on the west bank of the Batanghari River, setting up positions around Musang Island on 1 March.

The troops from Jambi were placed under the command of Major C. F. Hazenberg, who had arrived at Sungai Dareh that day with the main body of his column. Major Hazenberg organized his forces at Padangpanjang on 27 February. The Hazenberg column (Kolone Hazenberg) comprised a staff unit, a medical section, and three infantry companies (one still in the process of formation). These units braved harsh weather and navigated challenging terrain to reach Sungai Dareh. After assuming command, Major Hazenberg was assigned to conduct guerrilla warfare in the Lubuklinggau area. His objectives included resisting Japanese advances from Jambi and attempting to recapture the Palembang airfield. However, with only two companies totaling approximately 350 men, Hazenberg's forces were too dispersed and under-equipped to effectively contain the superior Japanese forces advancing north from Lahat. Hazenberg's initial plan involved mobilizing two companies to attack Japanese positions at Muaratebo and deploying another company through Kotobaru to confront Japanese troops at Muarabungo. A reserve force from Jambi was stationed at Kotobaru, while a company guarded mining boats on the Batanghari River near Musang Island. Heavy rains caused the Batanghari River to overflow, temporarily delaying Japanese advances and allowing Dutch reinforcements from Padangpanjang to organize relief efforts.

Between 3 and 7 March, fierce battles ensued as Japanese forces attempted to cross the Batanghari River. Dutch intelligence reported significant Japanese casualties, which reduced their regiment to around 200 men. Encouraged by these reports, Hazenberg planned a counteroffensive on the night of 8–9 March, secretly assembling local boats and preparing provisions and ammunition. However, on 8 March, news arrived of General Hein ter Poorten's surrender in Java. Hazenberg immediately received orders to suspend all offensive operations. As a result, the planned counterattack was canceled, and all KNIL units in Sumatra were placed on a defensive footing.

=== Dutch last stand ===
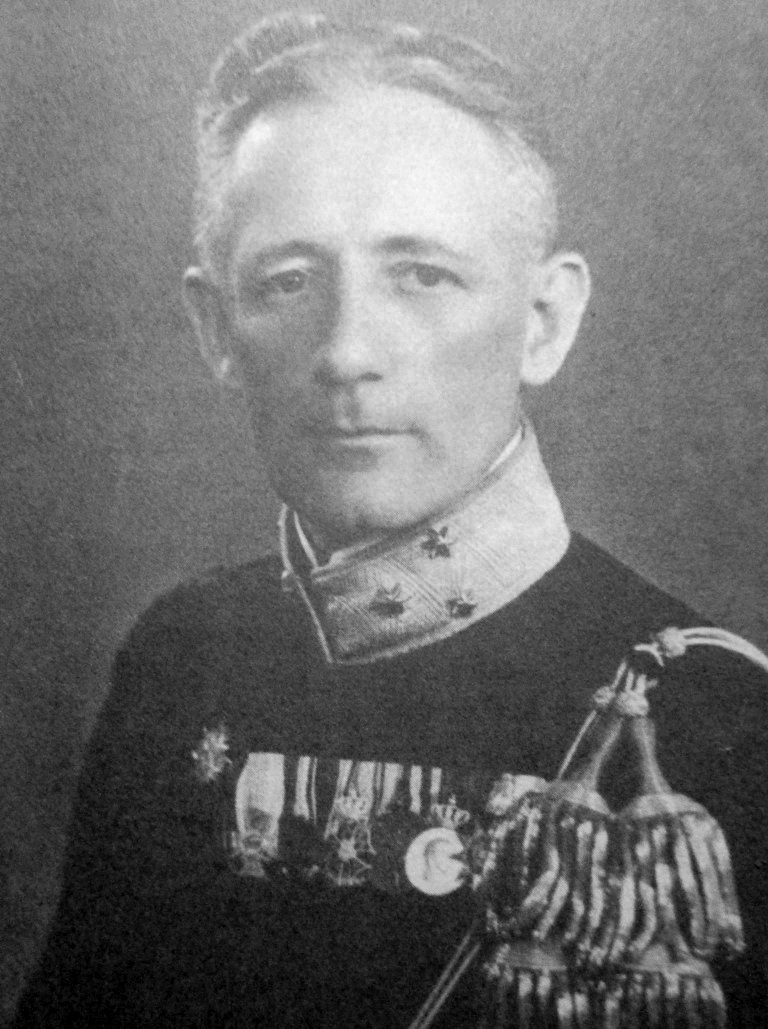
Major General Roelof T. Overakker organized a Dutch guerilla resistance that lasted until late 1943, even after his arrest.

By the Agreement of Kalijati on 8 March 1942, the Dutch ceded its Indonesian colonies to Japan. After the occupation began, the Japanese divided Indonesia into three military administration areas. The Sumatra region was under the 25th Army Military Government Department (Rikugun) in Singapore led by General Tomoyuki Yamashita. However, for nine days after receiving the Dutch surrender, Japan had not yet reached West Sumatra, leaving a power vacuum in the region and what remained of Dutch authority in complete disarray. Many high-ranking Dutch officials had fled to safety on allied ships or evacuated by airplane, abandoning those who remained behind and creating mass panic. Most of the Dutch residents who stayed in West Sumatra lived in small houses or military pensions, while only a few Dutch military police patrolled the area.

Even after the official capitulation of the Dutch East Indies, rogue elements of the KNIL army of Sumatra disavowed this order. The rogue elements were led by then governor of Sumatra and former resident of Sumatra's West Coast, Adriaan Isaac Spits, who declared the Dutch army in Sumatra would continue to fight "to the last drop of blood". He and rebelling KNIL generals later formed the Dutch Territorial Command in Sumatra. At that time, the Territorial Command of Central Sumatra, including West Sumatra and North Sumatra, was led by Major General Roelof T. Overakker, who took over Lieutenant Colonel John Blogg's military jurisdiction over West Coast Sumatra. Before the Agreement of Kalijati, Major General Overakker suspected from incoming radio reports that the fighting in Java was going badly. His suspicions were heightened on 7 March when attempts to contact the KNIL headquarters in Bandung were met with radio silence. Repeated unsuccessful communication attempts prompted Overakker to implement emergency measures in what was left of the Dutch East Indies in Sumatra. These included regrouping the remaining Sumatran and Allied forces in Sumatra at Tanah Alas, in an effort to consolidate their positions. The Dutch planned to build defenses in the mountainous areas of Aceh, and in the districts of Takengon, Tanah Luos, and Tanah Alas. The Dutch Territorial Command in Sumatra then enacted a scorched earth policy across West Sumatra to slow down the Japanese advance, much to the suffering of the locals.

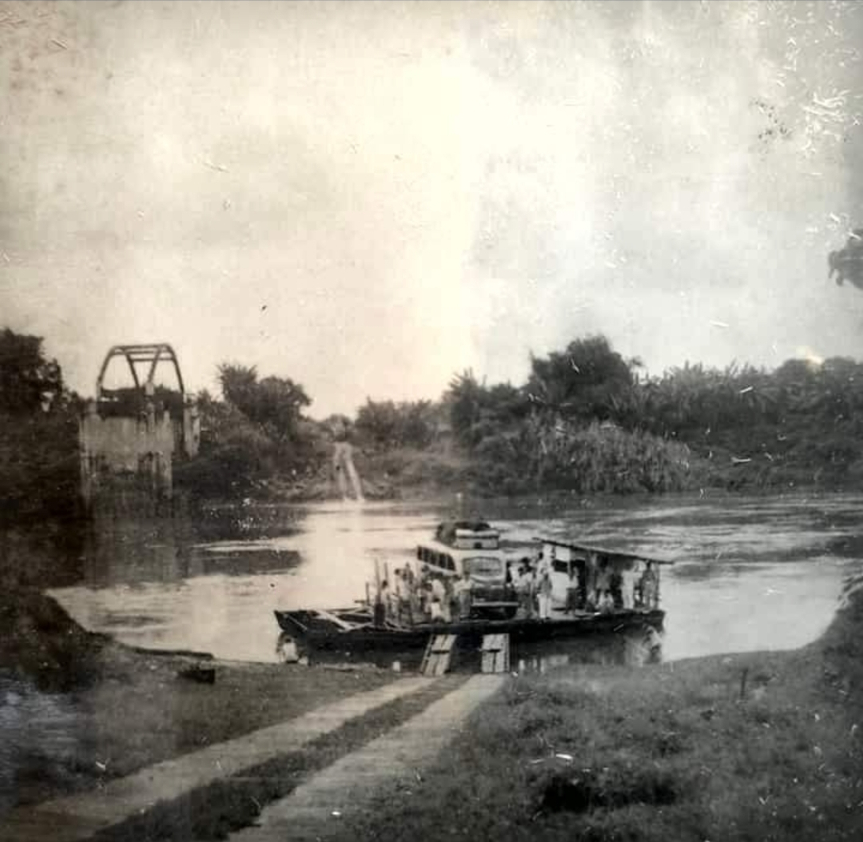
Post-war view of the Pulau Musang Bridge, shown after its destruction by the Dutch to prevent Japanese forces from advancing into West Sumatra

The Japanese army's advance from the north through Lubuk Sikaping encountered little-to-no resistance from the remnants of the Dutch East Indies army. Only the advance from the east met some resistance, but that, too, was also negligible. As the Dutch forces retreated, they attempted to sabotage their own infrastructure and resources to prevent them from falling into Japanese hands. Initially, the Dutch Territorial Command called on the local population in West Sumatra to destroy key infrastructure that could potentially be used by the Japanese. However, this request was rejected by the people, as they were unwilling to damage their own region. Realizing that they were without local support, the Dutch forces increasingly panicked. Japanese advances and the absence of local support forced the Dutch to confront both an external military threat and rising unrest in West Sumatra. During their retreat, the Dutch first damaged the Pulau-Musang Bridge in the Teluk Kepayang Pulau Indah, Jambi area. Before surrendering power, the Dutch dumped all their oil, gasoline, and assorted alcoholic beverages into the river (flood canal) near Sawahan in Padang, sparking fires that spread along the river to the Jati area and the villages of Terandam and Ranah. These fires did not cause significant damage. A similar act of sabotage occurred near Bukittinggi, in Gadut, where the Dutch set fire to their fuel supplies, filling the air with thick black smoke. In other towns, such as Batusangkar, Payakumbuh, and Solok, the Dutch burned gasoline and kerosene stored in depots owned by the Bataafse Petroleum Maatschappij (Batavian Oil Company) (BPM). However, through the initiative of Indonesian employees working at the depots, a large part of the kerosene stored in cans was saved and distributed to the people. Likewise, groups of people salvaged many abandoned drums of gasoline and lubricating oil for use in public transport, which had been in short supply.

==== Political prisoners of Kutacane ====
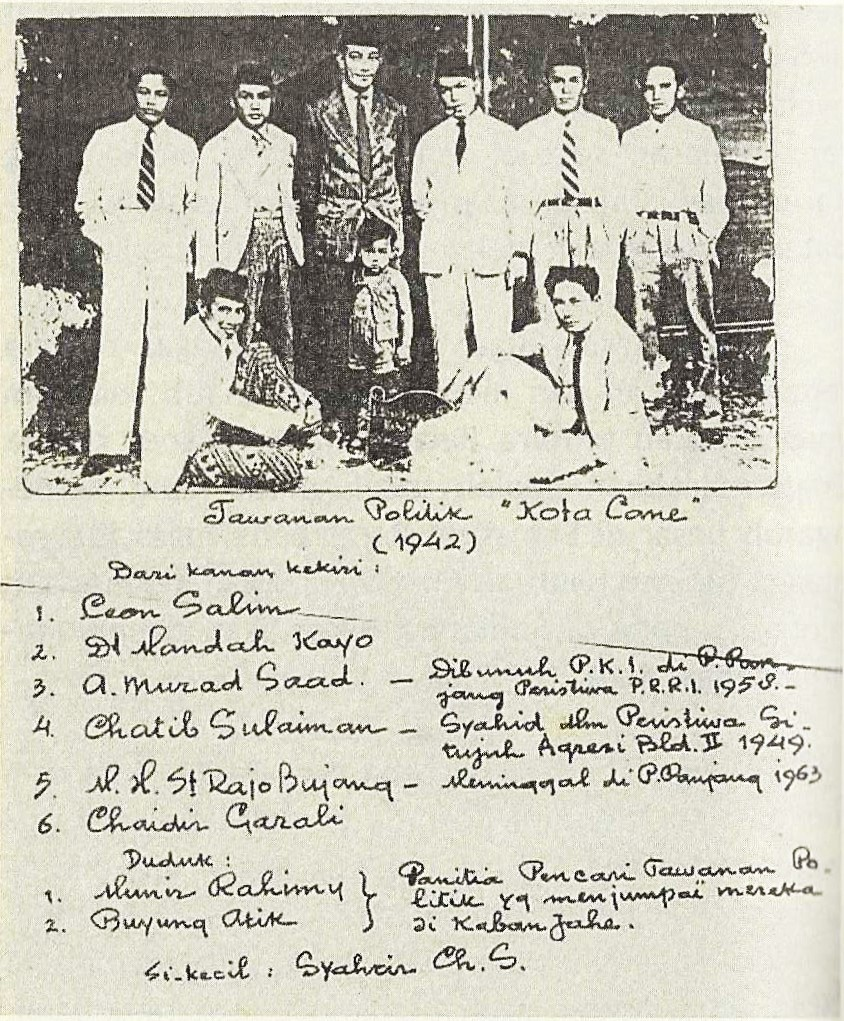
Political Prisoners of Kutacane (1942) pictured soon after their release from detention

As the Dutch troops began to withdraw from West Sumatra and Tapanuli, they maintained the appearance of a force still willing to resist the Japanese advance. The rugged terrain of West Sumatra, with its mountainous landscape, valleys, and canyons, was initially planned by the Dutch as a potential last line of defense. If push came to shove, then West Sumatra would be burned to the ground, leaving the enemy with nothing but rubble. The people of Minangkabau, although with few fully knowing of the impending Japanese invasion, sensed that something was wrong among the Dutch and felt that disaster might happen. Aware of the losses that the scorched-earth tactic could cause, many were strongly against it. Even former Indonesian East Indies officials who worked in the Dutch local government voiced disapproval. Demonstrations were planned to happen on 12 March in Padang Panjang against the scorched-earth policy. Led by Chatib Suleiman, Leon Salim, and several supporters, they established the Komite Penegak Merah Putih (Committee to Uphold the Red and White) and planned to raise the Indonesian flag at Padang Panjang due to its perceived symbolism. They intended to demand the Dutch hand over power to the Indonesians before the Japanese army entered West Sumatra, so that it would be Indonesians who would negotiate with the Japanese army. They were later arrested after word spread of the planned protests and were subsequently taken by the Dutch to the mountains of West Sumatra where the Dutch intended to make a final stand against the Japanese. Historian Martamin believed that by bringing high-ranking political prisoners such as Chatib Sulaiman, the Dutch hoped to secure their own safety from local discontent during their retreat to the mountains. At that time, Chatib Sulaiman had significant influence over the people of West Sumatra, especially among the Pemuda (youth). The Dutch were also aware of efforts of local resistance centered in Padang Panjang, but due to Chatib Sulaiman's involvement, they were able to retreat safely. The Dutch retreat to Kutacane, carried out in haste and panic, severely damaged their dignity and what was left of the reputation of the governance of the Dutch Territorial Command in the eyes of the people. Later pressure from the Japanese, mainly from bombing campaigns, led the Dutch to instead change location to Setan Mountain in Atceh. Initially sentenced to death, the political prisoners were released on 28 March 1942, following the Japanese occupation of Kutacane, which occurred without resistance. The surrender of KNIL Major-General Roelof T. Overakker, along with approximately 2,000 men, at Kutacane, west of Kabanjahe in Northern Sumatra, facilitated the Japanese takeover and ended Dutch rule over Sumatra. The Dutch all went back to West Sumatra once they got permission from the occupying Japanese. Previously, Sukarno had convinced Japanese occupational forces to send several of their men to scout and find Chatib Suleiman and his group who had been kidnaped by the Dutch. They later arrived in Padang Panjang and were then escorted to Bukittinggi on 2 April 1942.

The suppression of political movements and the elimination of native party influences, which had long served as platforms for the people in Sumatra, accelerated the buckling of Dutch rule in West Sumatra. This repression, combined with the oppressive policies of the Dutch, led to widespread resentment among the population. As a result, the arrival of the Japanese army in West Sumatra was initially welcomed as an act of retribution against the longstanding oppression endured under Dutch colonial rule. The Japanese entry into West Sumatra almost coincided with their movements in other parts of Sumatra. According to the account of Takao Fusayama, a former soldier of the 4th Guards Infantry Regiment of the Imperial Guards Division, after landing at Tanjung Tiram, North Sumatra, the Japanese Army pursued retreating Dutch forces across Sumatra and reached Padang within approximately one week. Cornered by advancing Japanese units, the Dutch forces surrendered, and Japanese troops entered the city on 17 March 1942.

Within days, all of West Sumatra was under their control, and the Dutch military commander in Sumatra surrendered unconditionally to the Japanese. By the 28th of March, the Japanese Imperial Army declared that the island region of Sumatra had been placed under the 25th Army along with the region of Malaya.

== Administration ==
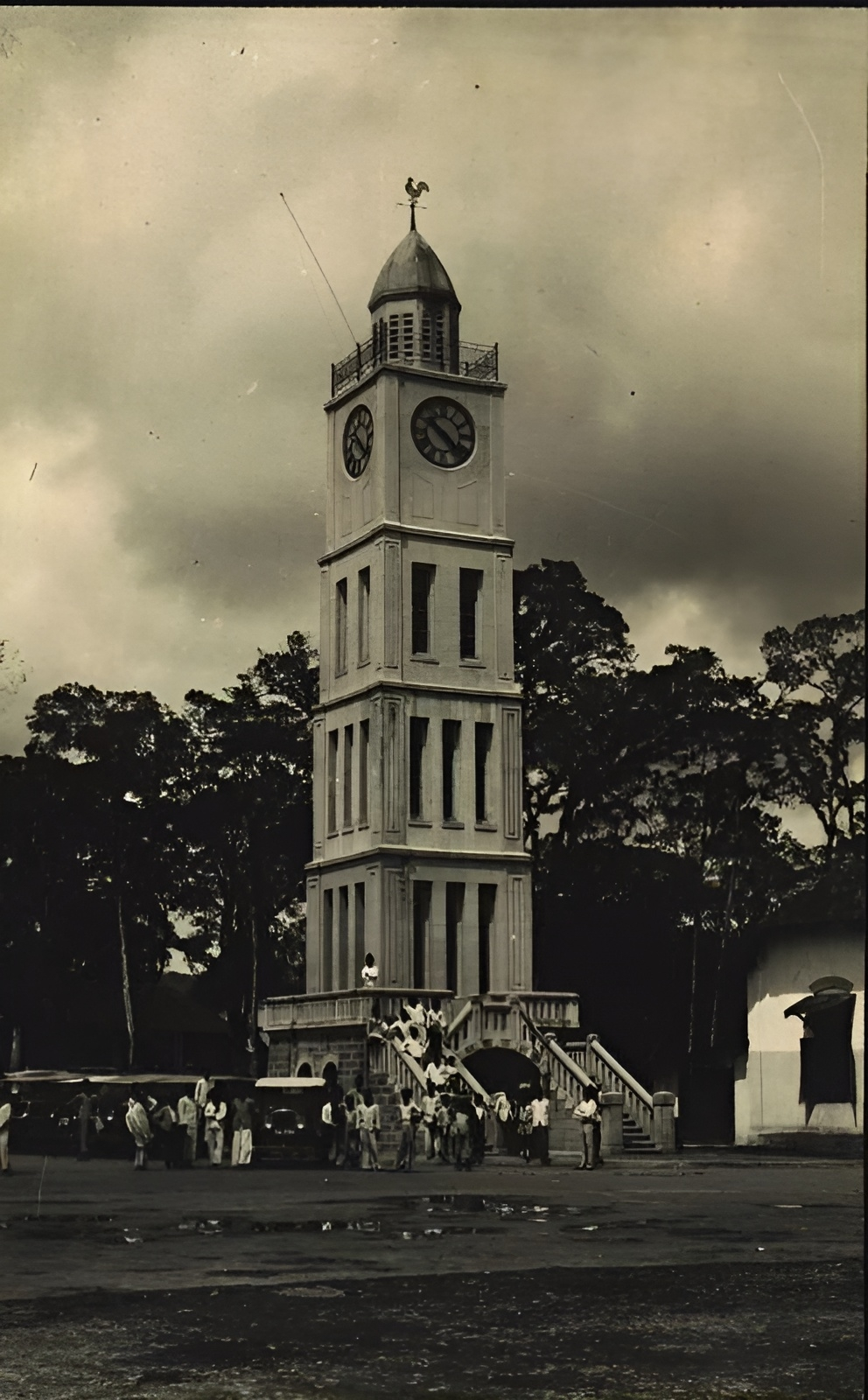
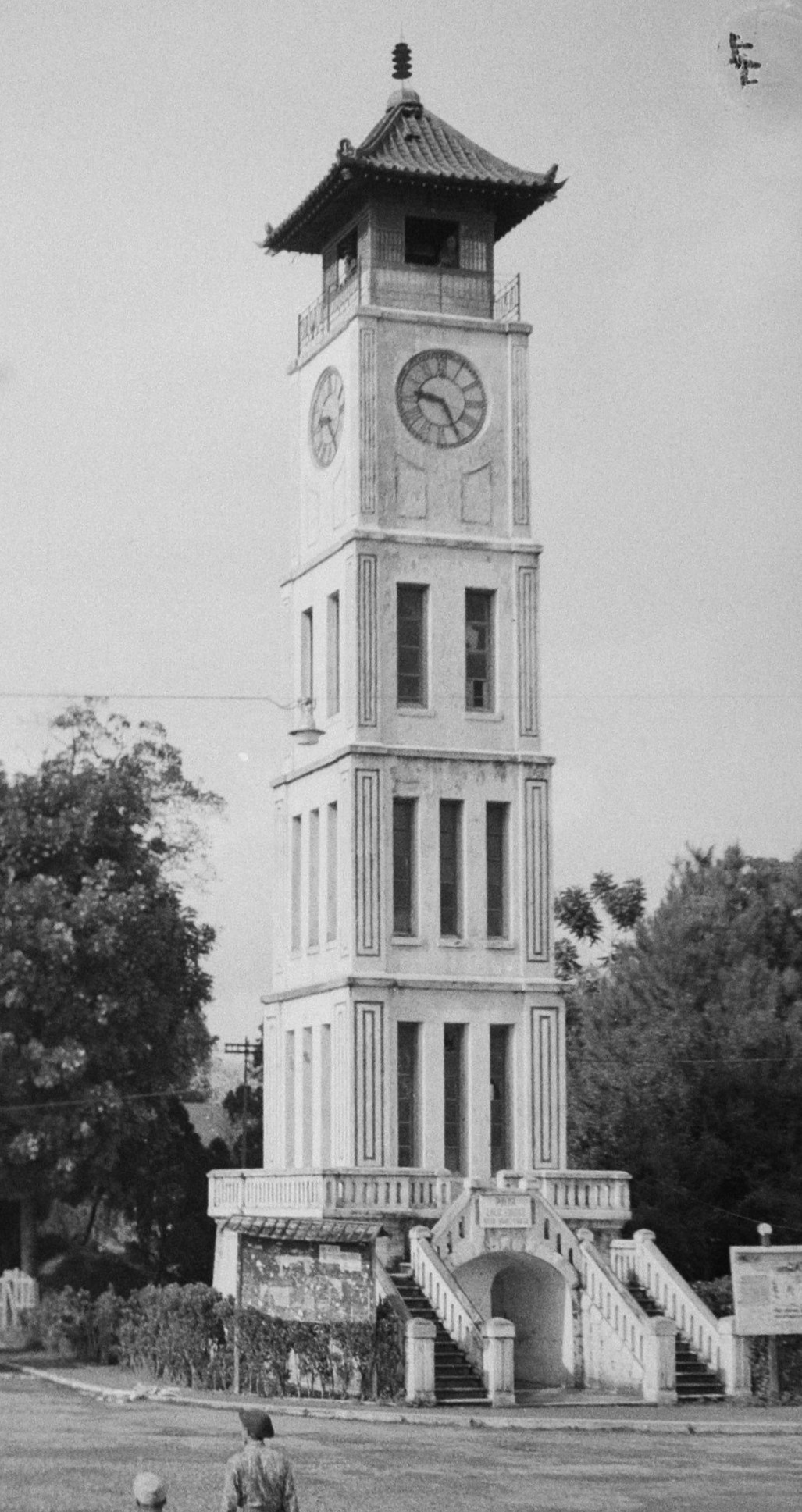
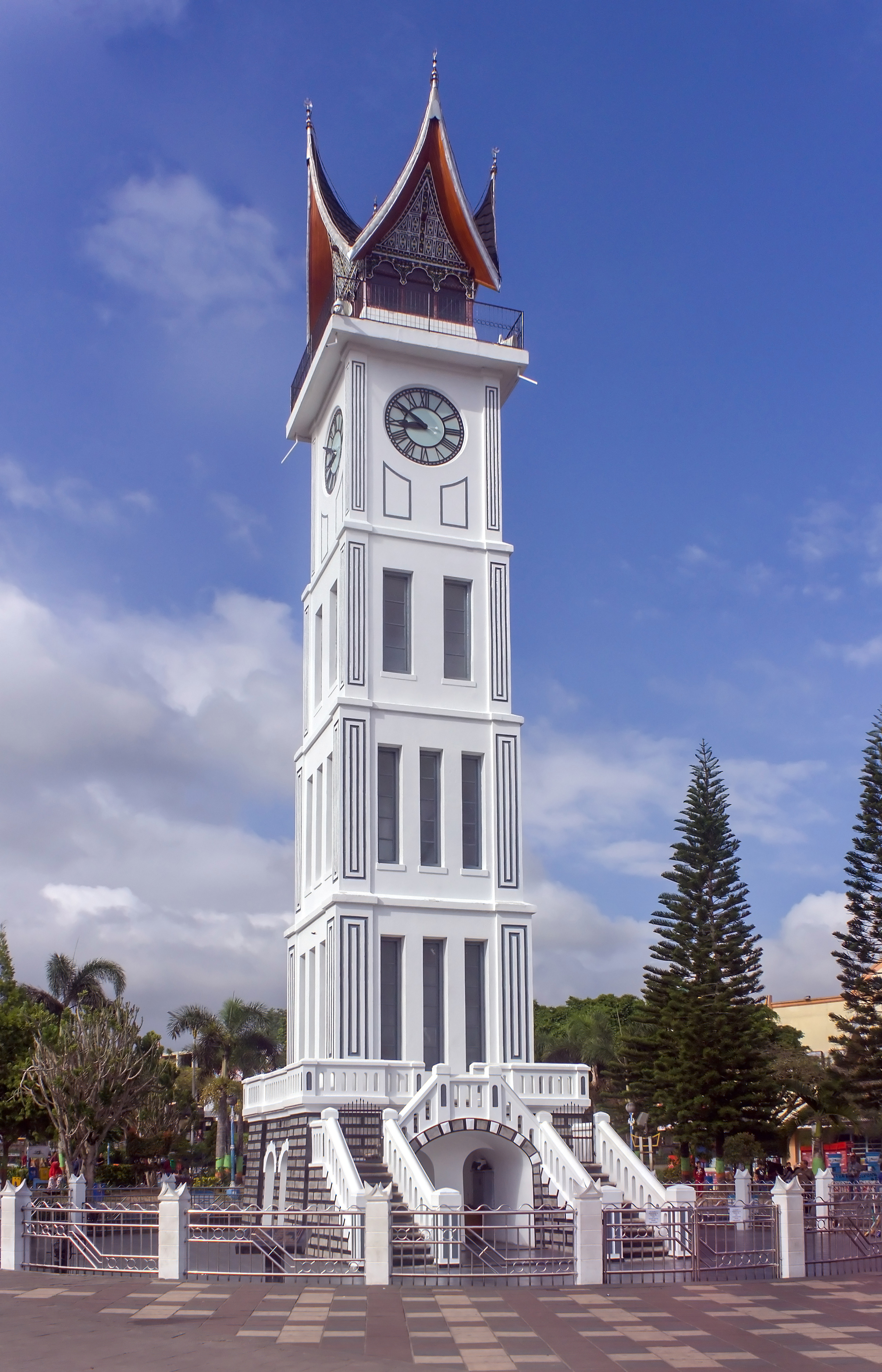
The roof of Jam Gadang imitated the shape of a Japanese pagoda (centre) during the Japanese occupation

According to Audrey Kahin, one of the focuses of the Japanese occupation army during the first year of occupation was to get the government apparatus in Sumatra functioning so that they could make efficient use of country's vital resources, particularly the oil fields near Palembang and the rubber plantations in East Sumatra. Within the broader Japanese framework, West Sumatra was not initially a priority in terms of economic interests, but it held significant strategic importance. Initially, it was a major route through which the Japanese expected to infiltrate their agents into Sumatra. However, since mid-1943, Sumatra's strategic importance increased as the Japanese predicted that Allied counterattacks against the west coast of Sumatra and surrounding islands would be launched via India's Andaman and Nicobar Islands.

At the beginning of April 1942, a combined body made up of military officers and four Japanese civilians, one of whom had long resided in Malaya and another in Java, replaced the military's provisional administration. This arrangement was part of the gradual establishment of an occupation administration in Sumatra, which had not been organized as fully or as quickly as the Japanese administration in Malaya. While the military handled Bukittinggi's police, transportation, and municipal affairs, the four civilians focused on general affairs, finance, industry, oversight of acquired property, and education. In West Sumatra, military officers continued to occupy administrative positions during this transitional period; Fujiyama Saburō (藤山三郎), for example, served as gunsei shibuchō (軍政支部長) or head of the military administration branch, before the arrival of civilian administrators such as Yano Kenzo. Likewise in other regions, the general orders for the Sumatran administration were issued in July 1942 and included the following: maintaining order; "winning the hearts and minds of the people" (minshin haaku); rebuilding vital industries, particularly oil; and consolidating transportation, harbours, and administrative organisations. The existing administrative system was to be employed as much as possible to carry out these directives. The Japanese revived the Dutch system of government and reappointed most of the former Indonesian officials who had been in the previous bureaucracy. The establishment of the civil administration in West Sumatra was completed in August 1942, when Yano Kenzo arrived as shūchōkan with 68 Japanese civil servants and administrators. By August 1942, the Japanese divided Sumatra into 10 shū (州), each headed by a shūchōkan. Unlike the former system, however, the shū administrative system (shū seicho) was highly decentralized, with each shū responsible for developing its own economy and establishing its own consultative bodies.

Sumatra in the occupation government structure was initially under the military control of the Singapore-based 25th Army. However, the 25th Army Command concluded that it was not possible to govern Sumatra from its headquarters in Singapore, especially in terms of protecting the area around vital installations. In subsequent developments, the direction of the war from the beginning of 1943 was unfavorable for the Japanese. On various Pacific fronts, the Japanese army began to be pushed back and the initiative for attack lay with the Allies. This circumstance forced the Japanese Army Command for the "Southern Area" to shift its main focus of policy from consolidating power in the newly occupied areas to a defensive strategy against possible Allied counterattacks. After a feud between Yaheita Saito and Shigenori Kuroda, Chief of Staff of the Southern Army, over the issue of relocating the 25th Army to Sumatra, a decision was made to separate Sumatra and Malaya on 20 April 1943. The headquarters of the 25th Army was moved from Singapore to Bukittinggi in Sumatra in May 1943. Consequently, Sumatra, which had previously been attached to Malaya, was made a self-governing unit. Recognizing Sumatra's potential to support the Japanese economy and military in the face of Allied forces, the Japanese separated Sumatra from Malaya on 1 May 1943. The 25th army took direct control of the city, later renaming it from Stadsgemeente (Fort de Kock) to Bukittinggi-Si Yaku Sho (Japanese: ブキティンギ市役所, romanized: Shiyakusho) and expanded the city limits for their needs. The city area Padang, was expanded to include the entire onderdistrict of Padang, thus Marapalam and Ulak Karang are included in the City of Padang City plus Seberang Padang, Teluk Bajur, Bukit Air Manis, and Gunung Pangilun, with a population of 78,000 people. The city was selected as the headquarters of the 25th Army due to its strategic and isolated location. Its hilly topography, flanked by towering mountains and valleys, most notably Sianok Canyon, offered natural defensive advantages, making it an ideal base for military operations during the Japanese occupation and fit for guerrilla warfare whether the necessity arrives in case of an allied landing on Sumatra.

Modeled after the system of governance in Syonan (then Japanese occupied Singapore), the Sumatran government also consisted of two main components: the military command (Gunsireibu) and the civil administration (Gunseikanbu). In mid-1943, the commander of the 25th Army, Moritake Tanabe, succeeded in establishing the Gunseikanbu, the central military government staff as the executive organ of government in Sumatra. This military government staff was headed by a Gunseikan which was held by the Commander of the 25th Army. As part of the military government, the Gunseikanbu was intended to support the activities of the military and military police (Kempei). In carrying out its administrative functions, the Gunseikanbu had ten departments headed by a Somu Buchō (Chief of General Affairs). The ten departments were those of the Interior, the Police, Justice, Industry, Finance, Public Works, Transport, Information, Transfer and Shipping, and Meteorology, whose departmental directors were overseen by the Director of the Interior, who acted as the deputy Gunseikan.

Chinese-language notice listing Japanese-appointed state governors (知事) in Sumatra, announced in December 1942.

Under the Gunseikanbu, each shū administration (which replaced the residency system) was placed under the shūchōkan. Whilst, each shū had three departments, namely those of the Interior, the Police, and Social Welfare. Other than the three departments, the shu had four sections, namely General Affairs, Industry, Finance, and Police. Two sections were actively involved in managing key aspects of the Japanese occupation's economic administration in the region. This included the internal circulation of goods and foodstuffs, the distribution of imported products from Japan, the handling of goods for export, budget and revenue management, the establishment of price standards for certain commodities, and the implementation of labor management standards. These operations were closely monitored by branches of the Military Government Headquarters (Gunseikanbu) in each province, which supervised and ensured adherence to Japanese administrative policies. With the Gunseikanbu's approval, the shūchōkan could establish several ad hoc organisations to assist the province and directly supervise the Police Affairs Department (Keimubu), which was independent of the Kempeitai and the police department of each region. Due to its decentralized structure, governors and lower-level institutions, particularly in East Sumatra, West Sumatra, and South Sumatra, were granted the autonomy to address the specific needs of their respective regions. While these regions were required to achieve economic self-sufficiency and meet their own food needs, these efforts often fell short. Food shortages frequently occurred in certain areas, and basic necessities such as soap, paper, matches, and other essential goods, had to be imported to compensate for local deficiencies.

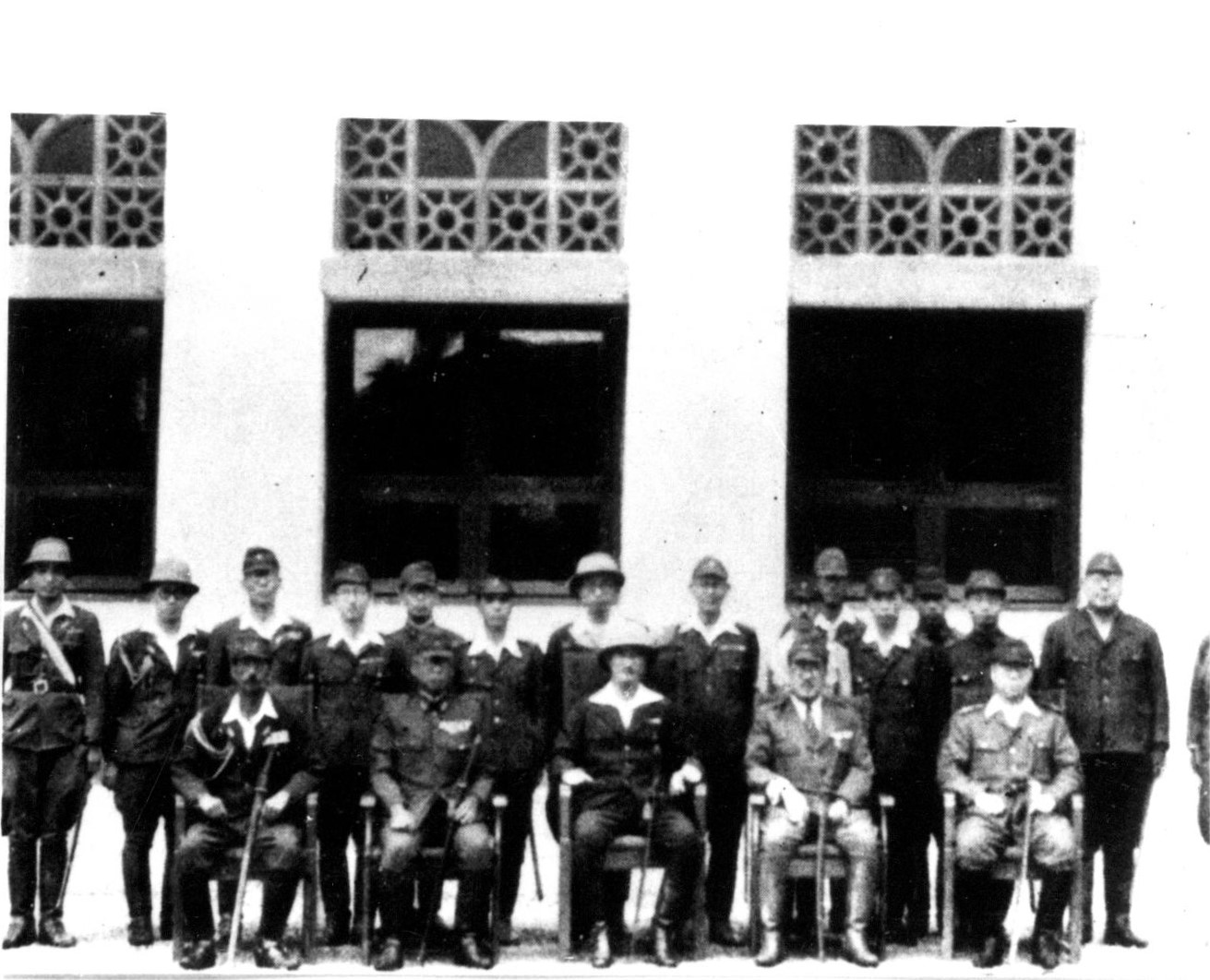
Occupation government of West Sumatra run by the 25th Army. (Left to right: Staff officer Nishiooeda, Field Marshall Hisaichi Terauchi, General Moritake Tanabe, and Governor Yano Kezo.)

The West Coast Province of Sumatra was formed in August 1942 under the name Sumatora Nishi Kaigan Shū to replace the residency/shū system. The province had its capital in Padang. The Gregorian calendar was replaced by the Japanese imperial year, which is ahead 660 years, and the time zone was adjusted to Japan Standard Time, which was about 2.5 hours off from the time in Tokyo. Former Toyama Prefecture Governor Yano Kenzo served as the first shūchōkan. Yano Kenzo arrived in Padang on 9 August 1942 along with 68 civil servants. Starting from the Japanese occupation, Padang Gemeente was governed by a Padang Shichō answering to the shūchōkan of West Sumatra. The division of West Coast Sumatra's administrative units was almost entirely based on the division made by the Dutch in 1935, consisting of 5 afdeelingen (departments), 19 onderafdeelingen (subdepartments), 20 districts, 49 subdistricts, and at least 430 nagari (settlements or villages). Historian Gusti Asnan noted that a slight difference between the Dutch and the Japanese administrative units was the exclusion of Fuku Bun Bangkinang and the inclusion of the Kampar Regency in Rio Shū (Riau Province). In running the government in West Coast Sumatra, the Japanese did not make many changes to the governmental structure, except for using Japanese nomenclature. The Afdeeling, headed by an assistant resident, was changed into a bunshū (分周), headed by a bunshūchō (分周長). Bunshū once divided into the onderafdeeling headed by a controleur became a fuku bunshū headed by a fuku bunshūchō or Kantokukan (Which was a Japanese transliteration for the word controleur). The Kantokukan was a low-ranking Japanese official, but had a relatively important position, as he was the liaison officer between the Japanese official layer and the bumiputera (native officials).

The district headed by a demang was changed to a gun (郡) headed by a gunchō. Onderdistricts headed by assistant demangs were transformed into fukugun headed by a fuku gunchō. Except for important positions in the administration, the Japanese still used native officials who had previously been in the Dutch East Indies administration on condition that they did not infringe on Japanese authority. This was because the Japanese who first came were soldiers who did not understand the organization and intricacies of civil governance. Japanese reports in 1942 indicate that governmental officials for West Sumatra who were later sent never arrived due to their ship being hit and sunk by Allied torpedoes. The highest native official headed the gun and its subordinate structure, the fukugun (副郡). The smallest government unit, the nagari, was termed son and the head of the village or sometimes nagari was called sonchō or son (村). Village heads continued to carry out administrative duties, but did not receive salaries from the authorities unlike during the Dutch period.

Following the Japanese capture of the Southern Areas, the Ministry of the Army in Tokyo tasked the Research Section of the South Manchuria Railway Company (Mantetsu), which functioned as Japan's principal center for strategic studies on Asia, with conducting foundational research on the occupied territories. In late 1942, approximately thirty to fifty researchers were dispatched from Manchukuo to Malaya and Sumatra, while a further thirty were sent to Burma. These researchers were assigned to various sections of the local gunseikanbu, primarily within research and planning divisions, and operated with a degree of independence from the standard administrative hierarchy. Their responsibilities included compiling research-based data and reference materials, advising military administrations through the submission of policy recommendations, and, on occasion, monitoring the activities of shūchōkan. As the headquarters of the 25th Army was located in Bukittinggi, the administration of West Sumatra was shaped significantly by the perspectives of these researchers alongside those of the chōkan.

=== Native policy ===
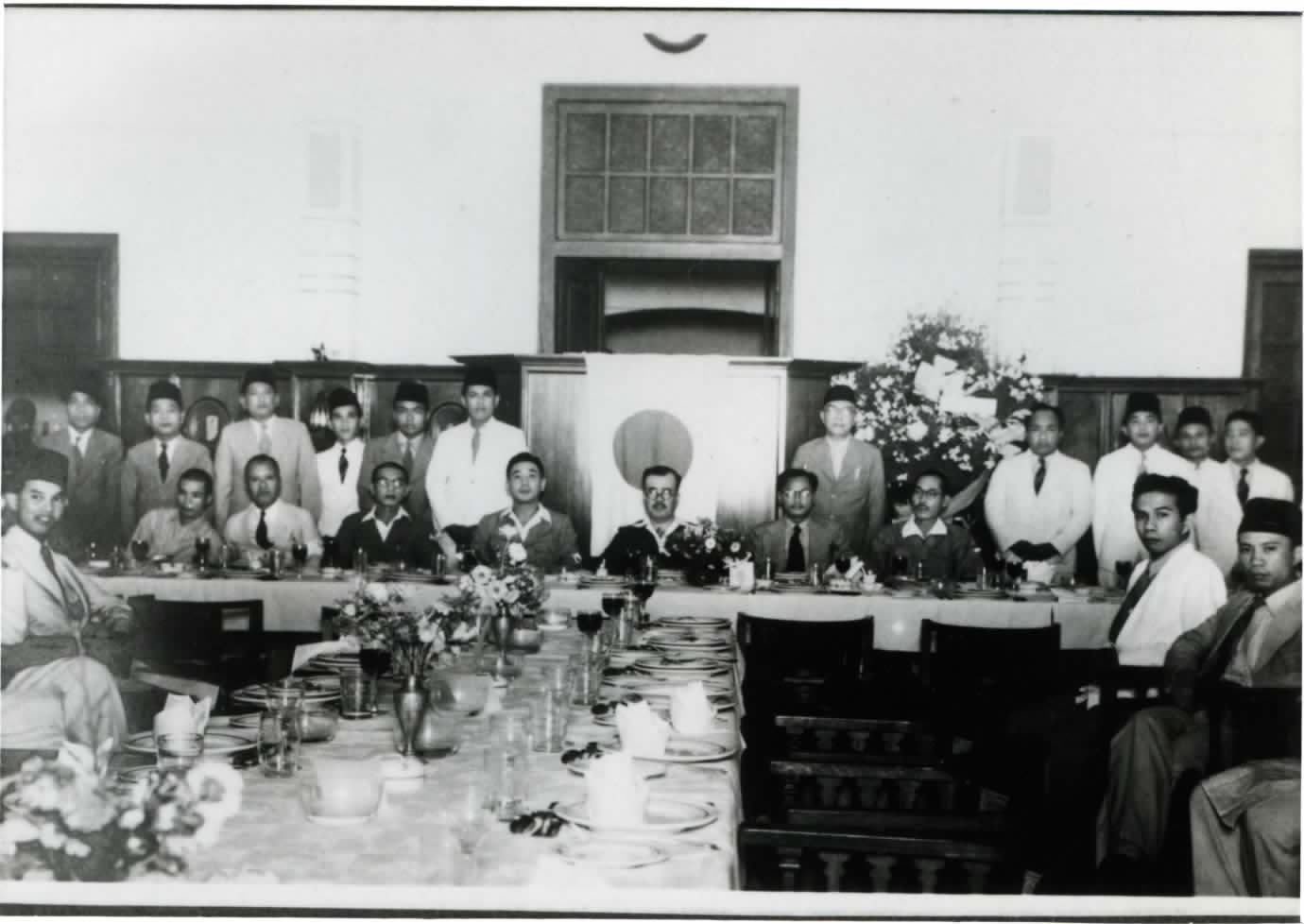

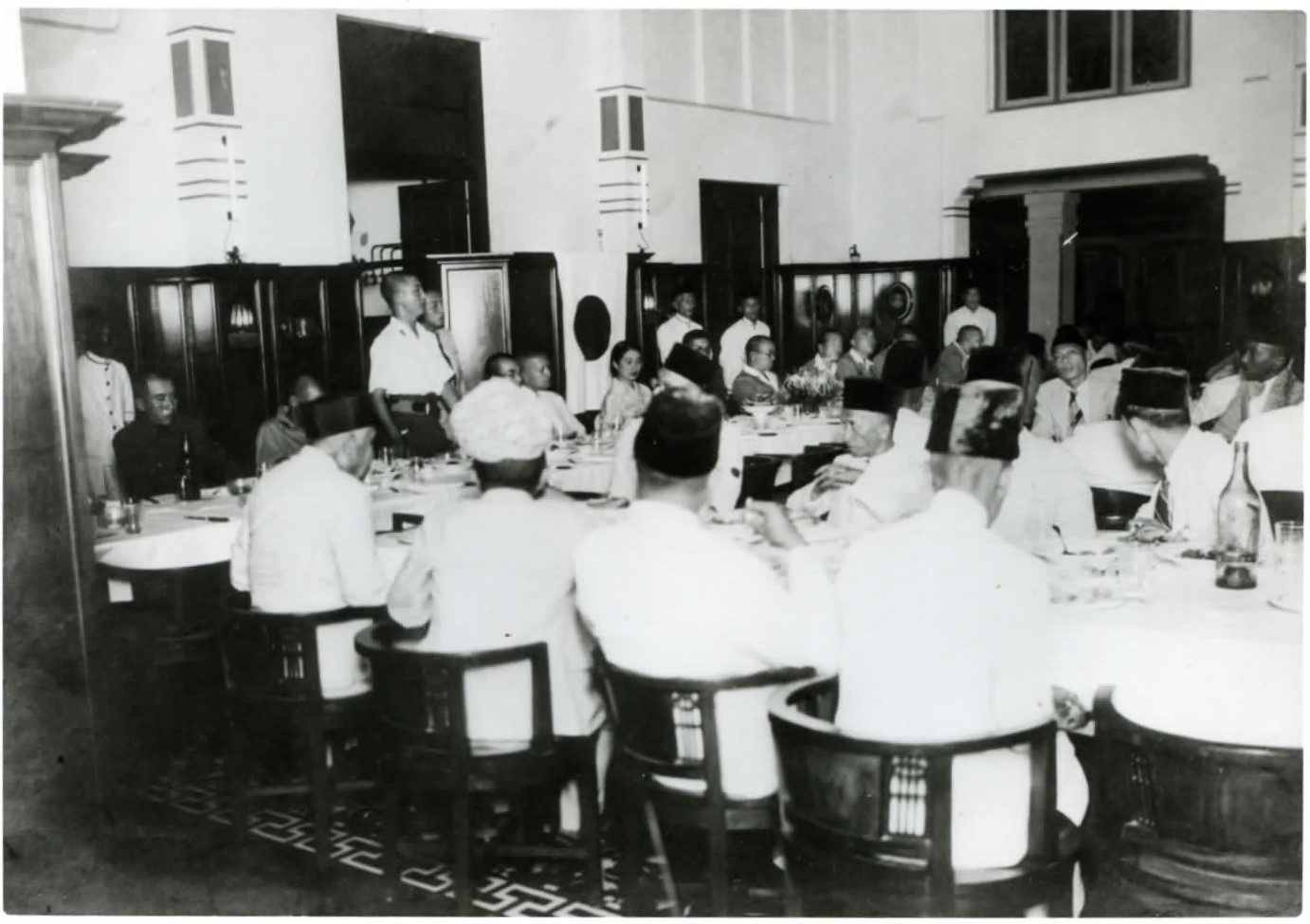
Situation during an official event at the shūchōkan office in Padang. 1st picture, Japanese and native officials pose for a portrait. 2nd picture, same place. Siti Aminah Usman wears a Kimono in front of the Japanese flag

Prior to the arrival of Japanese bureaucrats, the Japanese military leaders inherited the administrative structure left behind by the Dutch and were also tasked with maintaining order. Due to a shortage of manpower, the Japanese authorities relied heavily on native workers. The Japanese made sure that cooperation with the natives in Sumatra was vital for the war effort, given Sumatra's resources. And so, the Japanese sought cooperation among the native elite, both from civil servants (known as the pamong praja) and prominent independence leaders, rousing support from the locals. The Japanese utilized the three main components of West Sumatran society—adat (traditional customary) leaders, nationalists, and religious groups—as effectively as possible. Each group was assigned distinct roles based on their sociological backgrounds and societal influence. The adat group was tasked with organizing government administration, nationalists were given the responsibility of conducting propaganda, and religious groups were charged with mobilizing the people's support by framing Japan's war efforts as a "holy war" to expel Dutch rule. While Japanese officials agreed to employ West Sumatran natives in local governance, the military leaders were hesitant to fully trust them. Though the Japanese held preference towards the adat. Akira Oki noted that the concentration of rice cultivation and the Japanese affinity for the adat party improved the party's relative standing after the other two organisations fought it at the end of Dutch administration. By the end of the occupation, these opposing groups had established their dominance in various leadership positions with some ongoing rivalry: the nationalists in political and administrative domains at the Islamic party in mobilising the masses through well-established Islamic organisations and schools; the adat party in administrative domains, primarily at the nagari level but also to some extent at the West Sumatran level.

Japan's attitude towards the leaders of West Sumatran society was described by H.J. Benda in Document No. 47, dated 27 April 1942. The occupation government recognized the importance of acknowledging sources of political power in West Sumatra. Nationalist figures from the region had to be embraced, and political leaders, as well as other influential figures within the community, were co-opted to help achieve the goal of "Japanizing" the people of West Sumatra. Through prominent local leaders like Mohammad Sjafei, Chatib Sulaiman, and others, the Japanese sought to erase Western influence and instill a deep hatred for anything associated with Western culture. Slogans created by the Japanese, such as "Inggeris dilinggis" (the British will be crushed), "Amerika diseterika" (America will be ironed out), and "Belanda kurang-ajar" (the Dutch are insolent), were used as propaganda tools to foster anti-Western sentiment among the people of West Sumatra. The pamong praja maintained the administrative system, which largely followed the Dutch colonial model. In reality, however, the policies of the military leaders in Sumatra were largely constrained by the principles governing the administration of the occupied "southern territories", which dictated that the native pribumi population should be "guided in such a way as to engender confidence in imperial power, and premature encouragement of native independence movements should be prevented". Even so, from the early stages of the occupation, Japanese personnel in West Sumatra developed what historian Akira Oki describes as an "overtly paternalistic" sympathy toward the Minangkabau population. Japanese officials showed a particular fascination with the Minangkabau creation myth, which they perceived as bearing similarities to the Japanese creation myth. The creation myth became well known among Japanese administrators familiar with local traditions, and it was frequently invoked to support narratives of shared origins. The story was also employed as a tool of propaganda, with Japanese authorities emphasizing this supposed affinity when seeking cooperation from the Minangkabau community.

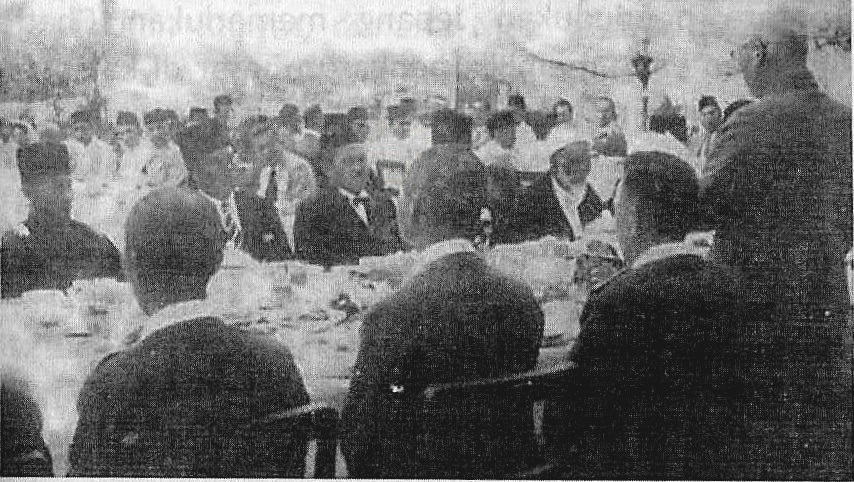
Chatib Sulaiman and other Minangkabau leaders attending a banquet set by the Japanese occupation government

The 25th Army in Sumatra was significantly more reluctant than the 16th Army in Java to grant Indonesians any substantial role in civilian or military administration. Consequently, local involvement was initially limited to the lowest administrative level, the nagari (village). At this level, the Japanese retained many Dutch colonial administrators and avoided replacing the existing nagari heads with new figures. For other administrative positions, however, a strict selection process was conducted. Thus in the first months of the Japanese occupation, Colonel Fujiyama and his assistant, Lieutenant Ichitaro Wakamatsu, who were responsible for forming the ranks of the government in West Sumatra, relied on a committee composed of Japanese military officers with the advice of a local official, M. Arief Dt. Majo Urang, in appointing new officials. Previously, after the 1927 Rebellion, Madjo Orang was appointed assistant demang for adat affairs, then became demang in 1940. Both Colonel Fujiyama and Ichitaro Wakamatsu, were actively involved, traveling extensively throughout West Sumatra to oversee and participate in the recruitment and administrative setup. As a result of the selection process, around 21 people were chosen to be gunchō and 47 people to be fuku gunchō. Various educated West Sumatrans also gained significant provincial posts, including Sutan Mohammad Rasjid, named prosecutor at the Padang High Court, with others serving in the shūchōkan and bunshūchō offices. The segregation and assignment of different tasks to the three main groups of Sumatran society, (the adat, nationalists, and religious groups), meant that the differences between them became clearer. All three community groups vied for influence by collaborating with Japanese authorities, aiming to become the occupiers' 'golden children'. The division of labour and the pressure of work that they went through continued until the Japanese were defeated. The indigenous people remained the dominant layer of society in the administration of government (especially at the Nagari level), the nationalists became the bureaucrats at higher levels (especially in West Sumatra) and the religious people remained the main pillar for mass mobilisation through the establishment of various educational institutions and Islamic organisations.

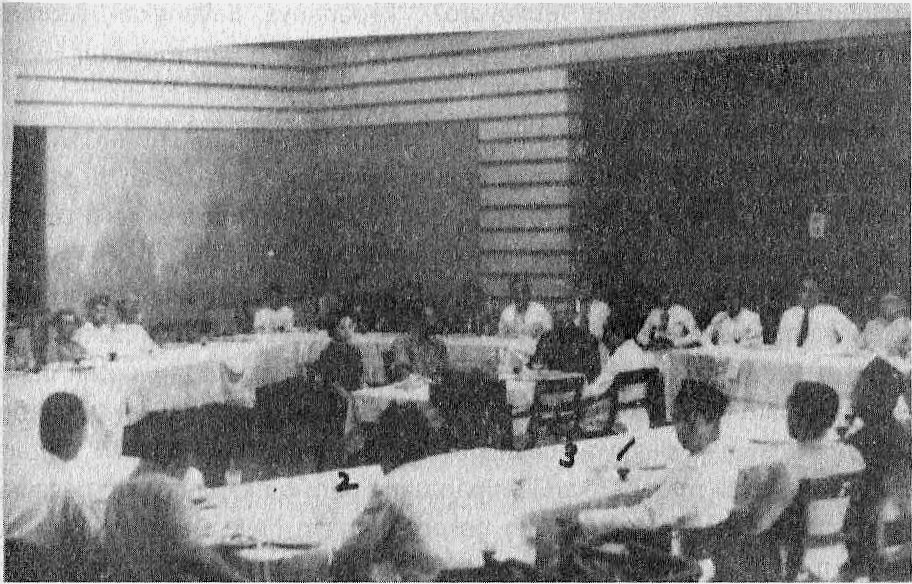
Meeting at the Information (clarification) office, Sendenhan.

In cultivating the local leadership, the Japanese attempted to align themselves with the leaders of the people. However, once it became clear that these leaders were vigilant and resistant to manipulation, the Japanese reverted to utilizing the existing Dutch colonial apparatus. This administration became coercive through force, often subjecting the populace to physical punishment such as tempeleng (harsh slaps) and repeated usage of derogatory terms to enforce Japanese orders. During the era of the Shū Sangi-kai (Prefectural Council), the Japanese acknowledged the influence of local leaders, who could potentially obstruct their efforts. To manage this, they established the Shū Sangi-kai, a council devoid of autonomous authority. Its role was merely advisory, answering questions from the shūchōkan on how best to support the Japanese war effort. In residencies deemed politically sensitive, the Japanese occupation authorities carefully balanced the influence of the pergerakan (a term encompassing popular political and religious movements) against that of the pamong praja and kerajaan (traditional rulers). Around the same period, the Japanese established propaganda organizations in certain residencies to manage former pergerakan politicians and Muslim reformers. Thus, the council's recommendations were publicized by the Senden-han (Propaganda Division) and followed by enforced mobilization of resources and labor from the people. These propaganda efforts served to curb the populace's independent activities while leveraging them as a counterweight to the administrative power of the kerajaan. The members of the Shū Sangi-kai, operating under the constant threat of the feared Kempeitai (Japanese military police), could do little but attempt to mitigate the harsher aspects of Japanese actions. Amid suspicions of potential resistance from pro-Indonesian groups, Dutch guerilla networks, communists, or Chinese organizations that might oppose Japanese rule, the tokkō (special police for political affairs) were deployed to Aceh, East Sumatra, Palembang, West Sumatra, and Lampung. Two or three officers were assigned to each residency, as the Japanese assessed that these regions were politically sensitive. In addition, several Japanese intelligence officers were dispatched to East Sumatra, Palembang, and West Sumatra after November 1942 to monitor local activities.

As Japan's position in the war deteriorated, their efforts to unify and mobilize the populace became increasingly desperate. After the Center of the People's Power (Putera) organization in Java, led by Sukarno, was transformed into the Hōkōkai (Badan Kebaktian Rakyat or People's Loyalty Organization; Service Society, in Japanese), a similar one-party system was implemented in Sumatra. This was the Seikaigansyu Hōkōkai (Badan Kebaktian Rakyat Sumatera Barat or West Sumatran People's Loyalty Organization). This was in line with the dissolution of all political parties and popular movements upon the Japanese arrival. Unlike the Jawa Hōkōkai, such organizations were restricted to the individual residency level. In West Sumatra, the Seikaigansyu Hōkōkai included prominent figures from various societal groups. Notably, the office was led by Mohammad Sjafei, who was appointed chairman and entrusted the management of the office to Sutan Mohammad Rasjid. Before the Seikaigansyu Hōkōkai could fully make its presence known, Japan's surrender was prompted by the atomic bombings of Hiroshima and Nagasaki. The defeat brought an abrupt end to Japan's occupation and prevented the organization from establishing itself as intended.

=== Direct control over Information ===
==== Press ====
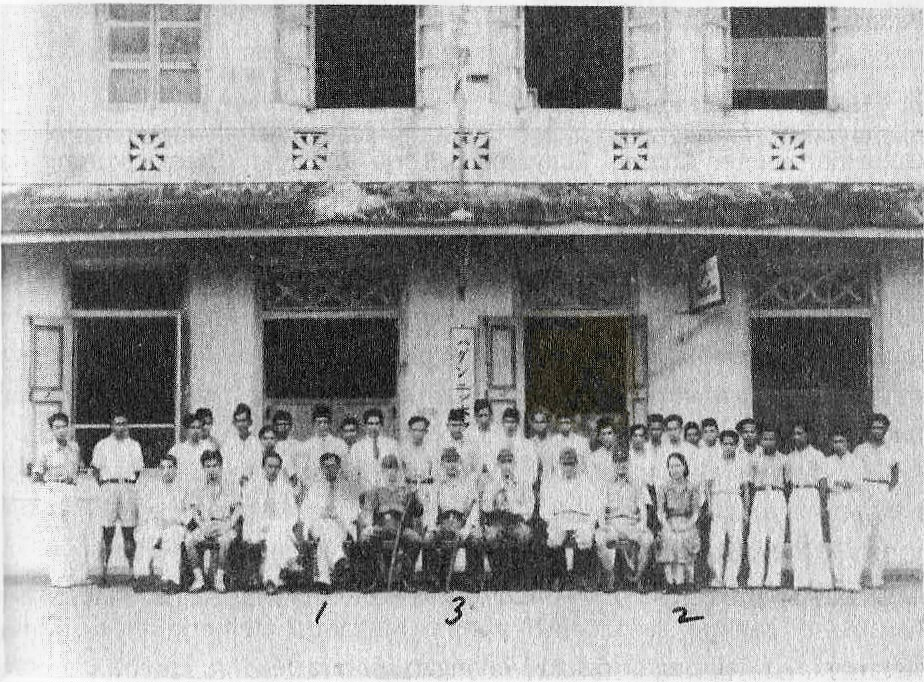
Abdoel Madjid Usman (1), Siti Aminah Usman (2), with Lieutenant Utsumi (centre holding a white baton) in front of the 'Padang Nippo' (Padang Harian) newspaper office 1942.

Before the war, the press in Indonesia had experienced significant growth despite operating under the restrictive "rubber laws" imposed by the colonial government. However, during the Japanese occupation, this growth was severely disrupted and practically halted. Prior to the Japanese arrival, Padang had several active dailies: Persamaan, the only national daily in West Sumatra; Sinar Sumatera; the Malay/Chinese Dagblad Radio; and Sumatra Bode, the only Dutch-language newspaper in the region. However, Sinar Sumatera and Sumatra Bode disbanded just days before Japanese forces entered Padang, leaving only Persamaan and Dagblad Radio, both of which faced significant challenges. Cut off from global news, they could no longer rely on the Dutch news agency Aneta, which had ceased operations; nor did the Japanese Dōmei Tsushin (Federated News Agency) have a branch in the area. Impacted by various difficulties, the national daily Persamaan, with Marah Nurdin as its director, struggled tenaciously to survive. The Japanese soon took issue with Persamaan, which had published a report about local men who collaborated with the Japanese secret service, openly wearing an "F" on their sleeves to signify their allegiance. These individuals were known to exploit their positions, often seizing property and even robbing village treasuries. Persamaan's editor, Mulkan, was accused of defaming the Japanese army, leading to an immediate ban against the newspaper until it was reviewed by authorities. This marked the first censorship imposed by the new Japanese administration.

However, the Japanese went further, merging Persamaan and Dagblad Radio into a single publication called Padang Nippo, which served as Japan's voice in the region. The Japanese occupation government strictly prohibited the publication of any other newspapers. The press during this time was managed by the Sumatora Shimbun Kai (Sumatra Press Association) under the supervision of the Gunseikanbu, specifically its Information Division (Hodo Bu). Indonesian journalists served only as employees, while positions of influence and authority were held by Japanese journalists brought in from Japan. Indonesian and Chinese journalists who had worked on editorial teams or as correspondents before the war were compelled to work for Padang Nippo, Sumatora Shimbun, or Domei, as there were no other alternatives. The editorial team comprised a mix of staff from both previous dailies, with Marah Nurdin and Lie Oen Sam serving as editors-in-chief, alongside Suska, Mulkan, and Oel Tin Djin as representatives. This structure was short-lived, as subsequent arrivals of Majid Usman, an Indonesian educated in Japan, along with Chatib Salim and Nasrun AS, led to further changes. Marah Nurdin, Suska, and Oei Tin Djin were replaced by Majid Usman and Chatib Salim.

Editors, journalists, and readers of the newspaper later coalesced into a pemuda (youth) association. Originating from a readership network of children's and youth newspapers that accompanied the Padang Nippo publication, the association was created to circumvent Japanese laws in prohibiting any youth organizations other than in the fields of sports and the arts. This newspaper supplement, initially called Kodomo Shimbun Padang Nippo (Komodo Syimbun), was later shortened to KOSYIPANI, which inspired the formation of the Ikatan Pecinta Kosyipani (Kosyipani Lovers Association; IPK). The Japanese authorities, recognizing the IPK's growing influence as potentially detrimental to their control, discontinued Kodomo Shimbun in an effort to dissolve the organization. However, youth awareness had already begun to develop, and instead of disbanding, members quickly reorganized under a new name, Ikatan Pencinta Kemajuan (Association of the Lovers of Progress; IPK), which had a significant membership and established branches. This unexpected resurgence confused the Japanese administration as to its actual purpose, as the new organization expanded more rapidly than its predecessor, growing from 23 branches in several towns and villages. While the original IPK was chaired by Stam Djamil, the new IPK was led by S. Alaudin, also known as "Pamena", and headquartered in Padang. The organization focused on cultural and artistic development, including theater (sandiwara), dance, singing, literature, visual arts, and sports. Each branch engaged in these activities while serving a dual purpose: resisting the spread of Japanese cultural influence, particularly through Bunka Ka (cultural institutions established by the Japanese), and fostering unity among Minangkabau youth.

The sports and arts movements under the Ikatan Pencinta Kemajuan (IPK) were closely monitored by Japanese occupation authorities. As chairman of the IPK, the organization's leader was frequently summoned by the Senden Bu (Propaganda Committee) and the Toku Ka (Security Supervisory Committee) for questioning. To avoid dissolution, the IPK strategically incorporated small portions of Japanese singing and dancing into its performances while simultaneously promoting both the Japanese and Indonesian languages and literature. This approach provided the Japanese authorities with less justification to disband the organization. Due to these careful measures, the IPK remained active throughout the Japanese occupation and into the early period of Indonesia's independence movement. The organization continued to contribute to the struggle for independence during and after the occupation. Among the young leaders of the IPK who remained involved up to the time of Indonesia's proclamation of independence were such notable figures as Nas Achnas, Durmawel Achmad, Zainal Gendi (Zage), Ismail Ibrahim, M. Raid Malik, Chaidir N. Latif, Emzita, Djamaris, Djalidar Naulah, Rustam Sinaro, Rusli Halil, Anas Bisma, Djamhur Djamin, Bustanuddin Ismail, Raflir Djamalus, H. M. Ridwan, Wisbar Aldar, Ramli, Munir Djalatin, Z. Dt. Bandaro Pilihan, Rohana Adam, and Rasma Rasam, along with many others who contributed to the movement.

In addition to Padang Nippo, the Japanese established the Kita Sumatora Shimbun, which was written in Japanese using Kanji script. Initially based in Padang, Sumatora Sinbun was later relocated to Padang Panjang, where it continued operations until Japan's defeat. The English edition of the Dōmei Tsushin news agency remained the sole source of news during this period and served as the central information bureau during the occupation, with its Sumatra office based in Bukittinggi. All reporting and commentary in newspapers and by news agencies during this period were purely propagandistic, aimed at praising the Japanese government and military. As a result, no Indonesian or so-called "national" newspapers existed during the Japanese occupation.

==== Radio ====
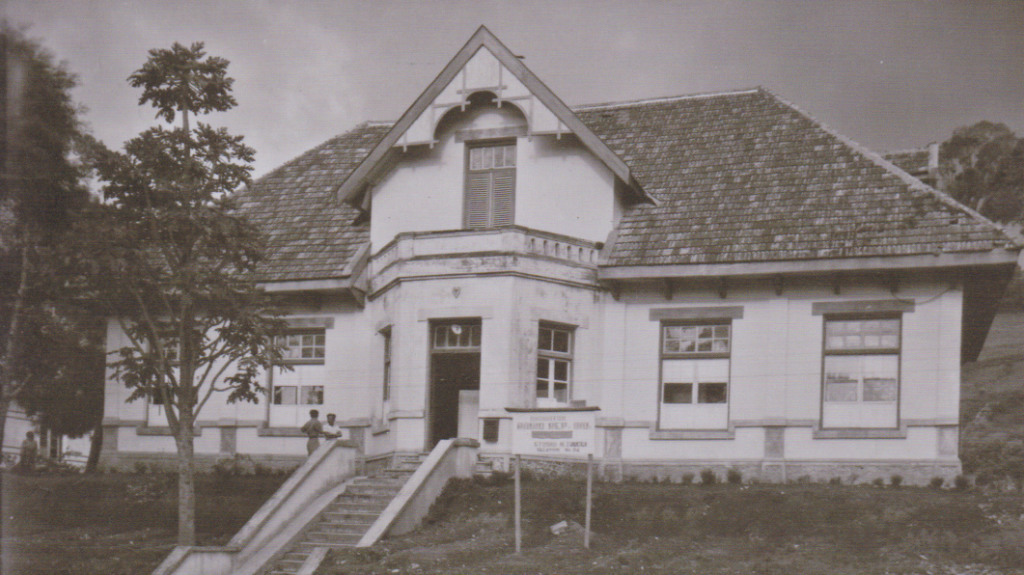
Bukittinggi Studio on 31 December 1950, now the RRI Bukittinggi Museum

Before the outbreak of World War II, Sumatra had only one radio transmitter, operated by the Dutch in Medan. Thus, at the entry of the Japanese into West Sumatra there were no operational radio transmitters, as the Amateurs Radio Omroep Padang (AROP), established by the Dutch, had ceased operations following the arrival of Japanese forces. The Japanese military established several additional low-power radio studios and transmitters at strategic locations throughout Sumatra, notably Bukittinggi, to disseminate propaganda. the Japanese radio transmitter in Bukittinggi had the call sign Bukittinggi Hōsō Kyoku. Subsequently, additional transmitters were constructed in Padang and other locations, operating under the designation Hōsō Kyoku Yangwat. Radio receivers used after the Japanese occupation began were restricted to receiving broadcasts from designated transmitters.

As the war intensified, the Japanese sought to strengthen their propaganda efforts. The Bukittinggi studio was designated as the central broadcasting hub for Sumatra, known in Japanese as Sumatora Chūō Hōsō Kyoku (Sumatra Central Broadcasting Bureau). During September 1944, the Japanese constructed Sumatra's largest radio transmitter, designed as a propaganda tool to boost morale and secure backing for Japan's war effort. The new central transmitter, with a power of 1.5 kW, was inaugurated in Bukittinggi, alongside the older, smaller transmitter. This central transmitter coordinated and distributed programs to regional stations, for relay, at scheduled times. In anticipation of possible air raids, the Japanese military also constructed large bomb shelters to protect the radio infrastructure and personnel.

Due to wartime circumstances, broadcasting schedules were frequently adjusted to align with the prevailing military situation. Daily communication between the central studio in Bukittinggi and regional studios was required to disseminate updates and implement changes. To control information, the Japanese authorities did not publicly announce the frequencies of the Bukittinggi transmitters, and all radio receivers were set to only receive broadcasts from Bukittinggi. Similarly, in other regions, it was prohibited to tune into any foreign broadcasts, particularly those from Allied forces. Even studio personnel were forbidden from accessing enemy broadcasts to prevent the spread of counter-propaganda. As Bukittinggi was the center of Japanese military administration in Sumatra, the broadcasting strategy of the central Bukittinggi studio was dictated by the Japanese military government through its propaganda office (Sendenbu). The studio head received daily instructions from Sendenbu, which guided all technical and editorial decisions over broadcast materials. Broadcasts were divided into two categories; Japanese-language broadcasts and Indonesian-language broadcasts. When simultaneous bilingual broadcasts were needed, Japanese broadcasts took precedence. According to the Indonesian Department of Information, the overarching goals of Japanese propaganda were:

1. To secure Indonesian support for Japan's Greater East Asia War (Dai Tōa Sensō).
2. To instill confidence in Japan's victory over Allied forces.
3. To promote Shōwa Statism as a superior ideologue to democracy.
4. To encourage the use of the Japanese language.
5. To integrate Japanese culture into Indonesian society.

In West Sumatra, particularly in the Agam region, schoolchildren were exposed to Japanese songs through radio broadcasts. One of the most prominent radio stations of the time, Sumatora Tyou Hozokyoku, frequently aired Japanese songs in 1942, and it is known to still preserve records of Japanese songs from that era. Among the many Japanese songs introduced to West Sumatran society, one that remains notable is Aikoku Kōshinkyoku. The song was not only performed with its original Japanese lyrics but also translated into Indonesian. The translation of Japanese songs into Indonesian began as early as 1942, coinciding with the arrival of Japanese forces in Indonesia. Due to the popularity of the song via radio, Japanese authorities caused the song to be frequently performed during important events organized by the Japanese, such as school ceremonies, community meetings between Japanese officials and locals, and military drills. These events were often accompanied by morning exercises known as Taisō, held from 6:30 AM to 7:00 AM, during which participants, including Japanese soldiers and local residents, faced the rising sun. This strategy continued until Japan's surrender, after which the Bukittinggi radio transmitters fell silent.

==== Theatre ====
Since 1943, a professional theatre company known as Ratu Asia was active. The company performed at a cinema hall named Sinko Gekizyo by the Japanese. Until early 1945, the theatre company, led by Sjamsuddin Sjafei, presenting different performances each night, except on Fridays. The themes of Ratu Asia's stage productions often contained elements aimed at fostering national consciousness and patriotism. These included dramatizations of historical figures such as Tuanku Imam Bonjol and Teuku Umar Johan Pahlawan. Other plays focused on social education, including titles such as Air Mata Darah, Studen X, and Seruan Batin. Despite repeated efforts by the Japanese Propaganda Agency (Senden Han) to recruit him, Sjamsudin Sjafei refused to collaborate, even refusing financial incentives. His refusal was a strategic effort to prevent Japanese influence from shaping the company's artistic and ideological direction. As a professional theatre company, Ratu Asia maintained close ties with Ikatan Pencinta Kemajuan (IPK). Both organizations shared a common vision in promoting cultural and nationalist themes through their performances.

== Reception ==
According to historian Akira Oki, Minangkabau interest in Japan can be traced as far back as 1905, following Japan's victory over Russia. While some viewed Japan as representing a "yellow peril," others regarded the triumph as a sign of Asian resurgence. During the 1930s, Minangkabau publications increasingly discussed Japan, often critically. After Japan's invasion of China in 1931, suspicion toward the country deepened. By 1935, Minangkabau periodicals questioned why the Volksraad had not made military service compulsory in the Dutch East Indies, arguing that such measures were necessary to defend the colony against Japan, which they accused of coveting Indonesian oil resources. Japanese slogans such as "Asia for Asians" were dismissed as “Asia for Japan,” and local tabloids warned against Dutch complacency and overreliance on British protection. Although a small number of Minangkabau intellectuals attempted to encourage pro-Japanese sentiment, distrust of Japan remained more prevalent than support up to 1941.

The situation changed in May 1941, when the Dutch colonial administration rejected demands from the Indonesian Parliament movement (Indonesian Political Federation). The decision fractured the fragile unity among Minangkabau political groups and inflamed anti-Dutch sentiment. Certain Minangkabau factions, possibly including youth organizations (pemuda), began attacking traditional leaders (penghulu) shortly before the Japanese invasion. At the same time, hopes for the collapse of Dutch rule began to align with expectations of Japanese intervention. Between 1941 and 1942, Japanese propaganda broadcast through Radio Tokyo reached Minangkabau audiences, promising liberation from Dutch rule and access to inexpensive Japanese goods once "freed" by Japan. These messages, coupled with the slogan of "Asian liberation," heightened anticipation of Japan's arrival among the Minangkabau, as elsewhere in the Indies.

=== Role of the F-Kikan ===
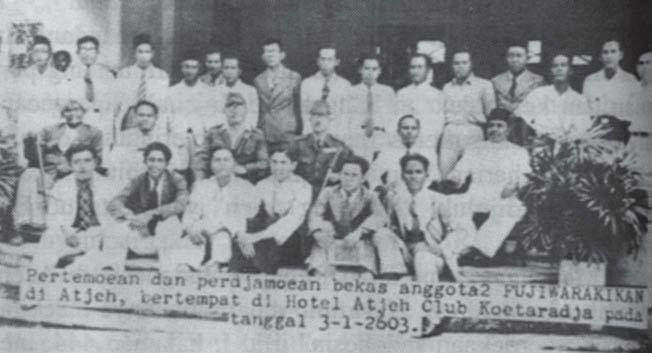
Ex-members of the Aceh F-Kikan pose with their Japanese leader, Masabuchi Sahei, in Koetaradja, 3 January 1943. Many later served as civil servants in the Japanese occupation government.

The F-Kikan infiltration force, deployed in Sumatra ahead of the Japanese landings, is believed to have substantially contributed to positive local sentiment. Prior to the invasion, Japanese spies under the F-Kikan, had previously exercised influence over the Minangkabau people. Some of the Japanese who had settled in West Sumatra since the 1920s acted as Japanese intelligence "sent to pave the way for their occupation". The organization recruited at least 10 Sumatrans (five of whom were from West Sumatra) to assist the Japanese in entering Sumatra, with a particular focus on West Sumatra. Additionally, the strategy of engaging religious groups played an influential role. Several religious leaders were approached by the Japanese, with some even invited to visit Japan or participate in various meetings and ceremonies hosted by the Japanese government. According to historian Gusti Asnan, given the deeply religious nature of West Sumatran society, the respect shown by the Japanese toward religious leaders helped to foster positive sentiments toward Japan, either consciously or unconsciously. While the F-Kikan achieved its most significant successes in Aceh, its director, Iwaichi Fujiwara, was not satisfied with merely securing promises of cooperation from the Acehnese people. Fujiwara expressed his desire to extend mobilization efforts to include the Minangkabau and Batak populations as well. Operating covertly, F-Kikan elements in Central Sumatra achieved significant success in spreading pro-Japanese propaganda. Fairly quickly, their efforts emboldened widespread support and sentiment among the Minangkabau and Batak peoples.

In West Sumatra, F-Kikan operatives arrived ahead of Japanese military forces. In Taluak, Japanese agents managed to force the local police to surrender their weapons. Nearby, in the Solok area—known for its strong anti-Dutch sentiment—the local Muhammadiyah organization welcomed the arrival of Japanese troops with a celebratory procession, including music and the ritual slaughter of two buffaloes as a gesture of gratitude. Muhammadiyah leaders also guided the Japanese vanguard, whose procession carried the Japanese flag.

=== Initial landing ===
In the early morning of 17 March 1942, led by Colonel Fujiyama, the first Japanese soldiers silently entered the city of Padang, and ten days later the Dutch military commander in Sumatra surrendered unconditionally. The Japanese military and the F-Kikan were deployed to Sumatra to propagandize the Japanese victory, their goal of "liberating the people," and their request for help in stopping Dutch and Indies authorities from destroying oil infrastructure and facilities. These efforts were particularly successful in Aceh, Northern Sumatra, and West Coast Sumatra, where uprisings and actions to prevent the destruction of facilities by local residents were seen in various areas.

When the locals of Padang ventured out in the early morning, well-armed Japanese troops were seen on the streets of Padang, occupying strategic locations. Some were on foot, while others were on bicycles. Initially, there was no display of fear; many even greeted the soldiers with gratitude. Shortly thereafter, the city saw an influx of people from neighboring areas who wanted to observe the newly arrived Japanese troops. The arrival of the Japanese army in Padang was initially hailed by the people, who chanted Merdeka! (Freedom), Banzai!, and "Long live Japan!". The people had been convinced that the Japanese were coming to liberate the nation from the rule of Western Imperialism. The Japanese invoked the slogan of "Asia for Asians" as a liberator of Asia from imperialism. However, the situation soon changed, and tensions increased as the soldiers began to arrest people and confiscate bicycles. Anyone who attempted to resist was met with physical force. Consequently, people started hiding possessions that might attract the soldiers' attention. Watching how the soldiers acted, some got the courage to rob the contents of Dutch and Chinese houses, which later spiraled uncontrollably into a bumi angkat movement across the region, with many justifying their acts as revenge. Dutch residences were ransacked and looted, and violence, including murder, became inevitable. The Chinese community, which had been seen as favored by the Dutch, became another target for the people's wrath. In every city in West Sumatra, the Chinese quarters, which were both residential and commercial hubs, were attacked, as few Dutch remained in the area. Chinese shops were looted and destroyed, and in some cases, killings occurred. The term Cina Mengamuk (the Chinese on a rampage) emerged during this time, as the Chinese community retaliated in an attempt to defend themselves against the attacks.

The Japanese authorities attempted to regain control of the escalating situation. However, when their initially peaceful efforts proved futile, the Japanese authorities resorted to harsh measures shortly after the unrest began. Within days the news of public executions on the beaches of Kasiek-Angek in Padang were widely broadcast. One of the first to be publicly executed was a person named Buyuang Ateh. He first dug his own grave and knelt against the sea to be shot from behind. These executions helped stop the many robberies and the Bumi angkat movement altogether. Along the coastline of Padang Beach there are still unmarked burial sites.

=== Rise of Sukarno ===
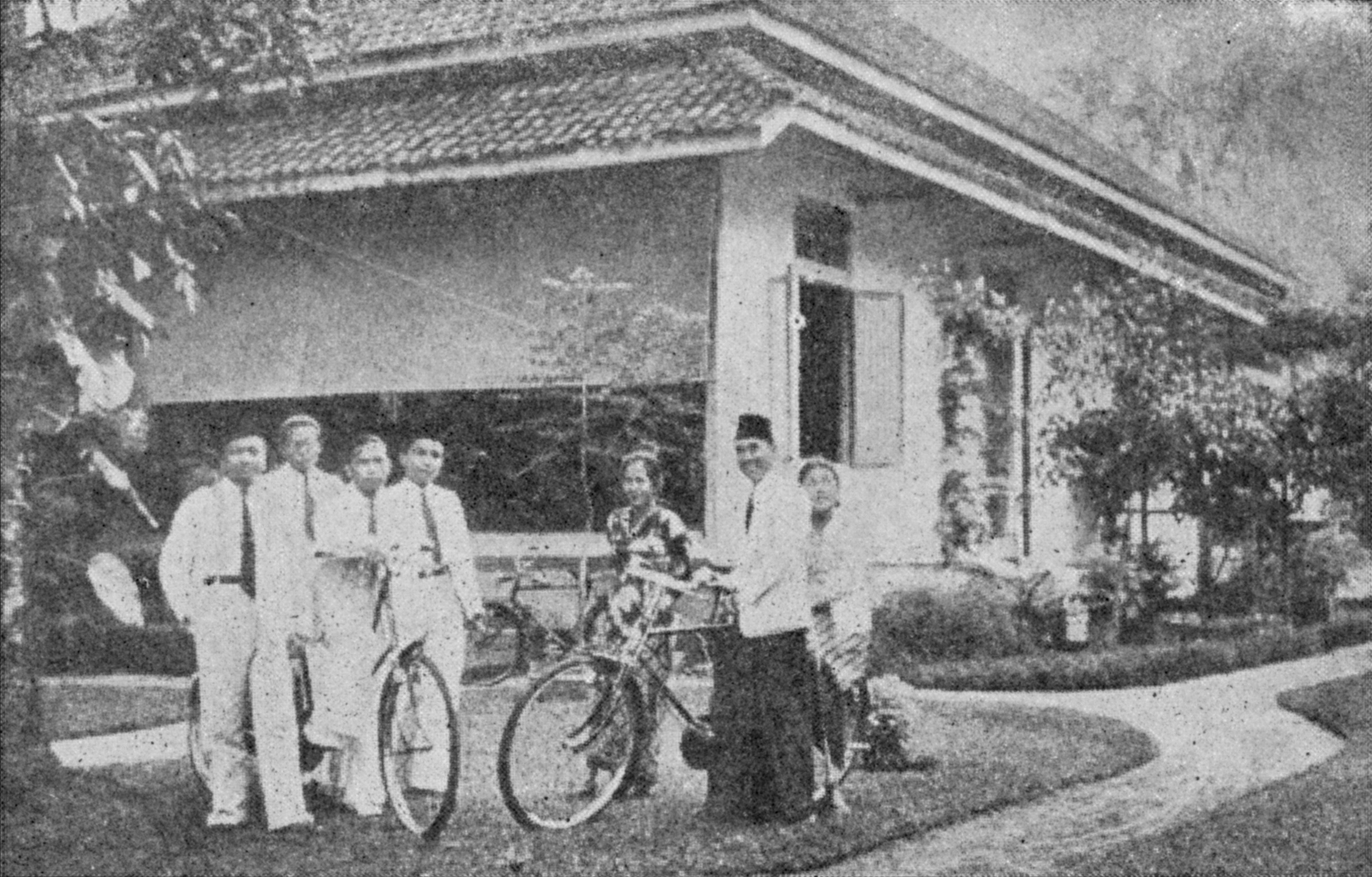
Sukarno at his home in exile, Bengkulu

Initially exiled by the Dutch to Bengkulu for his disruptive political activities, Sukarno was marched, bused, and trucked to Padang with the intention of transporting him to Australia to be kept as a prisoner. Sukarno was supposed to be transported further by ship, but it was rumoured that the ship broke up near Enggano island, with no other means of transportation were available. When word spread about the impending Japanese landings in Padang, the Dutch abandoned Sukarno to save themselves. Dutch resistance eventually collapsed across West Sumatra as reports of Japanese landings arrived not only in Padang, but also across the East Indies archipelago. After the Dutch failed to take Sukarno to Australia, he was stuck in West Sumatra for a period of three to five months, from February 1942 to July 1942. Members of Hizbul Wathan, an Islamic scouting association linked to Muhammadiyah and then based in Ganting, collected Sukarno and conveyed him to Padang by cart, where he was placed under the protection of local Japanese garrisons. Initially, the Japanese had files on Sukarno and decided that his return to Java was necessary to stabilize Indonesia. This decision was explicitly made by the Japanese 16th Army Headquarters after receiving numerous letters from Indonesian youths and student groups requesting the Army to find Sukarno and allow him to return to Java. However, during the first months of occupation, the Military Administration in Djakarta had no clue of his whereabouts, prolonging his stay in West Sumatra. In an attempt to locate Sukarno, the commander of the Japanese army in the city of Padang, Major Itoh, asked a liaison named Jahja Djalil to bring Captain Sakaguchi to Sukarno. Jahja Djalil had previously established contacts with the Japanese Consulate in Batavia on behalf of the Harian Persamaan newspaper in Padang as tensions rose in the Pacific.

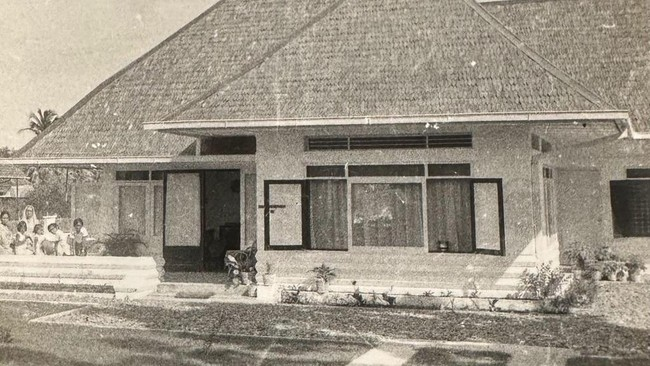
Dr. Waworuntu's former halfway house, where Sukarno and Inggit stayed in hiding during their time in Padang. Later owned by Achmad Arief Datuk Majo Urang in the 1960s.

Oral accounts and intelligence reports indicate that Sukarno and his second wife, Inggit Garnasih, lodged in Padang at a halfway house belonging to Dr. Waworuntu, a veterinarian and friend of Sukarno. It was from this house that Sukarno resumed his activities as a leader of the struggle. To the locals, he was seen as being always available, not only for political or matters of the homeland but also for simple gatherings, often accepting meal invitations from the public. Free from the confines of Dutch oversight, Sukarno's popularity continued to grow, as his speeches inspired people and strengthened their resolve to face the challenges ahead. During his travels, he was frequently accompanied by Sutan Usman Karim, also known as Suska, who at times served as his chauffeur in Padang and at other times acted as his spokesperson. During this time Sukarno was careful to conceal his identity and made efforts to maintain a low profile. When Sukarno became aware of the Japanese arrival in Padang, he was already wide awake at 4 a.m. Hearing a loud rumble of tracks and marching passing by Wawarontu's house, he initially mistook the sound for thunder. Unable to sleep, he and Waworuntu took a walk through the streets, where they witnessed cheering crowds and widespread looting by Indonesians as the Japanese had forced shops to open early. When Waworuntu asked Sukarno if he saw the arriving Japanese as liberators, Sukarno firmly rejected the notion, describing the Japanese actions as mere "performance" and labeling them as fascists as Sukarno knew of their brutality across occupied Asia. The people's jubilant response reflected the prevailing sentiment of gratitude toward the "Older Brother" (Japan) for liberating the "Younger Brother" (Indonesia). Many believed that independence had finally been achieved. To this point, conversing with Waworuntu, Sukarno was thoughtful on how he should approach the Japanese and the threat of Japan to the Indonesian people, debating which course of action should be taken as the opportunity arose. The historic house was destroyed in 2023 to make way for a restaurant which was in irony revealed to be a Japanese restaurant food chain, Marugame Udon.

After the arrival of the Japanese, Captain Sakaguchi, speaking in French, and presenting his official identification card as a member of the Sendenbu (宣伝部, Propaganda Department), was the first to introduce himself at a meeting with Sukarno. He was accompanied on this visit by Jahja Djalil as his translator. In response to Sukarno's inquiry about the purpose of his visit, Captain Sakaguchi stated, "It is nothing. I know that I need to make your acquaintance, and that is why I have come. That is all. I did not come to give orders to you. Meeting the famous Mr. Sukarno is my first duty. We know everything about you. We know you are the leader of Indonesia and an influential person. It is our honor to give you the respect you deserve." Three days after the meeting, Captain Sakaguchi "requested" Sukarno to visit the 25th Army's temporary headquarters in Bukittinggi. Not in a position to reject the request, Sukarno obliged and traveled to Bukittinggi by train. Word of his presence spread unintentionally from one train car to another and quickly beyond. At each station along the route to Bukittinggi, he was greeted with a hero's welcome, which required Sukarno to make a short speech to the crowd as a way to keep them from mobbing the train. Observing his popularity, specifically noticed by Captain Sakaguchi, the Japanese occupational army began to realize the potential value of having Sukarno as an asset.

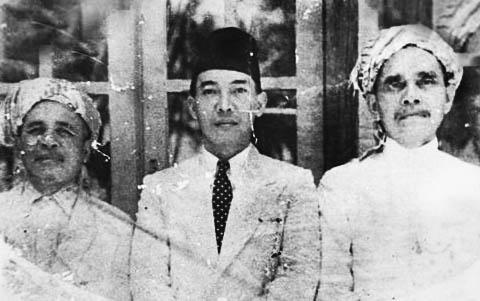
While in West Sumatra, Sukarno visited several figures, including Sheikh Abbas Abdullah at the Darulfunun Padang Japang College

In Bukittinggi, Colonel Fujiyama of the Imperial Army for Sumatra represented a second delegation; he also commanded the F-Kikan movement on the island, a military intelligence operation that infiltrated it before the fall of the Netherlands. Sukarno arrived at Colonel Fujiyama's mansion, a residence formerly owned by a wealthy Dutchman, located atop Sianok Canyon. During the two hour meeting, Colonel Fujiyama assured Sukarno that Japan would not interfere with Indonesia's national interests, recognizing the diverse religious and cultural makeup of the Indonesian people. His main objective was to restore peace and efficiently manage the government in the region. In return, Fujiyama promised formal and active political cooperation. Under severe psychological pressure, Sukarno, against his will, agreed to collaborate with Japan, stating his intention to carry out propaganda aligned with Indonesia's goals while also working towards the nation's independence. So, along the course of the occupation in Indonesia, Sukarno showed a cooperative attitude towards the Japanese. However, the leaders and figureheads of the National Party of Indonesia (PNI) were divided during a meeting at the Bumiputra office in Bukittinggi. Some supported cooperation with the Japanese, while others refused to do so. Anwar Sutan Saidi, the head of the pro-independence Bank National, and various trade organizations, chose to avoid the political track that would be the result of collaboration and instead focused on the economic track. His aim was to raise funds and procure weapons to support the struggle for independence. Tamimi Usman led a group of people who followed Sutan Syahrir's way of non-cooperation and mobilised underground activities. The group led by Chatib Sulaiman followed the path of struggling against, rather than collaborating with, the Japanese to gain independence.

==== Period of 'cosiness' ====
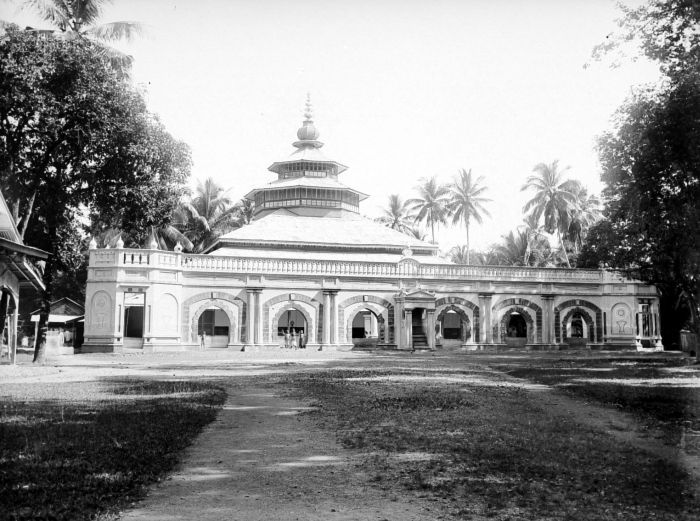
Ganting Grand Mosque, the headquarters of Hizbul Wathan in Padang. Sukarno stayed at the house of Oemar Marah Alamsjah (the Chairman of the People's Committee) near the mosque and gave a speech at the mosque.

In the first days of their arrival, the Japanese leaders in charge of West Sumatra carried out accommodative politics towards the inhabitants of West Sumatra. Audrey Kahin labeled the time from May to August 1942 as the period of 'cosiness'. This attitude was manifested, among other things, by granting permission to raise the red and white flag (Sang Dwi Warna), sing the Indonesian song (Indonesia Raya), and allow the establishment of the People's Committee (Komite Rakjat) organization (though accompanied by a military adjuntant of the Japanese 25th Army). This was in conjunction with how Sukarno managed to persuade most independence movement leaders to cooperate with Japan. Intending to create an independence committee, Sukarno decided to stay in Padang in February 1942 for 15 days. In his speech in Padang, Sukarno urged the people not to resist the Japanese army because the forces were not equal. According to Sukarno, the Indonesian people must use Japan to achieve their goal of realising Indonesian independence. Through his cooperative attitude, Sukarno managed to prevent the Japanese army's harsh actions against the people of West Sumatra. As a result, during the initial phase of the Japanese occupation, the Indonesian people were afforded a brief period of freedom to express their nationalist aspirations, which had long been suppressed. This window often manifested through acts of sympathie and "promised cooperation" with the incoming Japanese army.

For this brief period of time, the initial permission to raise the Indonesian flag and sing the national anthem was seen as a promising step toward realizing Indonesia's nationalist aspirations. As a result, efforts to support the Japanese administration grew across various sectors. One notable development during this period was the establishment of the People's Committee by Sukarno, as a temporary government to maintain calm in the region as Japanese troops consolidated their power. The People's Committee served as a semi-official body intended to mobilize public efforts and ideas to support future governance initiatives. Its creation quickly inspired the formation of similar committees in other areas.

Akira Oki's research records three notable disturbances that occurred in West Sumatra between May and October 1942. The first took place on 10 May, when three instructors attempted to pressure the nagari head of Junjung (possibly Sijunjung) to resign. When six Indonesian police officers intervened, an estimated 300 local residents shouted at the police, creating a situation that nearly escalated into a riot before Japanese soldiers dispersed the crowd. A second incident occurred on 8 August in the nagari of Tayer Baruh (Payakumbuh). A villager who opposed the nagari head was ordered to pay a tax, and in refusing the demand, he resorted to violence with the backing of other villagers. Police intervened and halted the confrontation before it developed into a wider disturbance. The third incident, on 10 October, differed from the previous two. In Lubuk Basung, an Indonesian police officer arrested a villager for allegedly violating a traffic regulation. An ex-policeman described as being 'in favour of the Dutch' challenged the arrest and attempted to rally support from nearby villages. However, the police succeeded in dispersing the group, sending both the ex-policeman and the villagers back to their homes.

However, once Japan felt its position was secure, restrictions were imposed to curb the early nationalist initiatives. The People's Committee was deemed unnecessary and subsequently dissolved. The use of the Indonesian flag and anthem was also banned. Soon announcements were posted on trees and in front of shops stating that only the Japanese flag could be flown. When the Japanese army prohibited the raising of flags other than the Japanese flag, Sukarno approached Captain Sakaguchi's office to request that the order to lower the Indonesian red-and-white flag be rescinded. His request was rejected. On this issue, Sakaguchi warned, "Perhaps, Mr Soekarno, you should not delay this too much." Sukarno thought otherwise, and before carrying out this instruction, Sukarno went to the mosque to pray. Sukarno personally feared that the flag ban would lead to a futile native uprising that would lead to significant repercussions against the Indonesian people. He next instructed the people to lower the flag "until the time comes when we can fly Sang Dwi-warna freely from all forms of foreign domination." Sukarno and Hatta viewed cooperation with Japan as the most effective route to Indonesian independence, "sailing in one ship with the Japanese while carrying our own merchandise." The flag ban prevented Indonesians in Bukittinggi from flying the Indonesian flag alongside the Japanese flag as part of the perceived 'liberation'. When the occupying 25th Army ordered the Indonesian flag to be taken down, Anwar Sutan Saidi protested and he was put in prison on 3 April 1942, later suspecting that he had pro-Dutch ties. Sukarno had to personally intervene for Anwar's release once he learned of Anwar's capture and subsequent tortures by the Kempeitai by denailing.

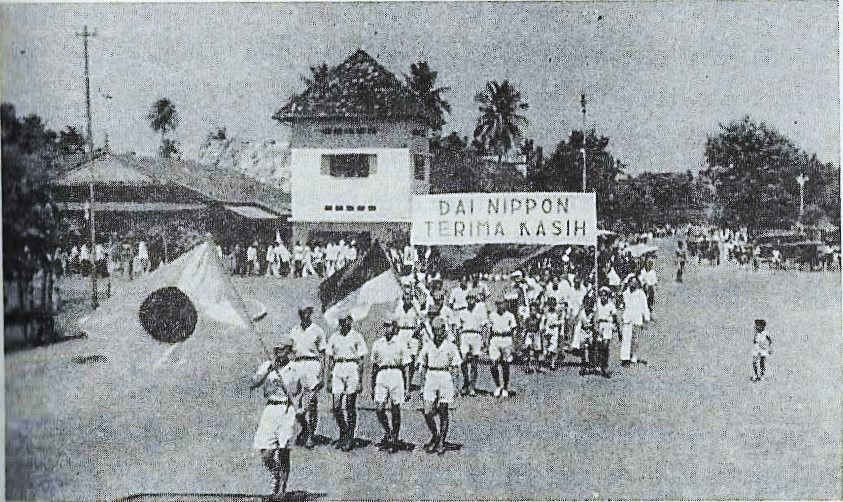
Pro-Japanese parade in 1942, organized by Pemuda Nippon Raya, formed by Chatib Sulaiman to train the youth.

Meanwhile, Leon Salim, Chatib Suleiman, and Mohammad Nasroen united all existing youth organisations into the Pemuda Nippon Raya organization. However, this organisation did not last long, as the Japanese suspected the idea behind its establishment and labeled it as a nationalist organization in disguise. Leon Salim was arrested by the Japanese on 14 November 1942 on suspicion of pretending to help them, but was released after a week. After the Pemuda Nippon Raya gaffe, political parties and national organizations were banned. All Indonesian political organizations in the region were suppressed within weeks of the Japanese occupation, prohibiting any discussions of independence in Sumatra, as well as any political activities that did not align with immediate Japanese objectives. The dissolution of political parties has been attributed to the 25th Army's own interpretation of a 20 November 1941 Liaison Conference directive stating that 'any premature incitement of their independence movements should be avoided.' The policy concluded in June 1942. While some social organizations were allowed to continue, these were heavily controlled, and attempts to revive political parties—long suppressed by the former Dutch administration—were entirely thwarted. Permitted organizations were those designed explicitly to enhance labor and resource mobilization, including groups such as Hōkōkai, Fujinkai, and the Giyūgun Koenkai. While Muhammadiyah and the Islamic Education Movement (Perti) were allowed to continue, their activities were strictly limited to non-political pursuits. Their survival has been attributed to their focus on religious and social issues rather than political ones. The Madjelis Tinggi Kerapatan Adat Alam Minangkabau (MTKAAM), a cultural council in Minangkabau, was similarly restricted. While it was not dissolved, it was denied the freedom to operate as originally intended. Its continued existence was primarily due to its non-political orientation. The Taman Siswa School program, which had long been recognized as an educational institution rooted in Indonesian nationalism and culture, was forced to change its name to the Taman Nippon Raya (Garden of Greater Japan). All meetings, publications, and listening to foreign radio broadcasts were prohibited, and even non-political organizations were banned by the Japanese. Violating any of these regulations could lead to brutal consequences, including torture by the Japanese military police, the Kempetai, then led by Sergeants Aiboshi and Kawaguchi, who were known to be harsh in their inspections. Beyond the challenges of daily life, including forced labor and other significant sacrifices, the population also endured intense ideological oppression. The Japanese motto "Asia for Asians", as liberation from European Imperialism, was also used as a tool to suppress aspirations for independence. Similarly, the slogan "Cooperation for the shared prosperity of Greater East Asia" was used to stifle any attempts by the people to revive previously suppressed nationalist movements. The Japanese political security agency, To Ku Ka, functioned similarly to the Politieke Inlichtingen Dienst (PID) of the Dutch colonial administration, working closely with the Japanese military police (Kenpeitai). Individuals suspected of engaging in anti-Japanese activities were frequently arrested, subjected to severe torture, and in some cases disappeared at night without a trace.

==== Women under the occupation ====
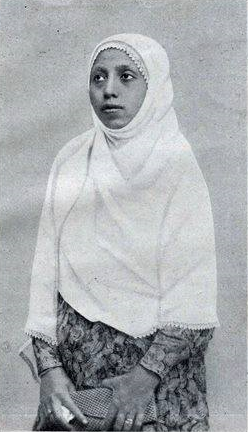
Womans rights activist, Rahmah el Yunusiyah demanded that the Japanese occupation government close down brothels and opposed the deployment of Indonesian women as comfort women.

During the Japanese occupation, many West Sumatran women were victims of Japanese army violence, especially sexual exploitation. Acts of violence against women occurred since the first days of the Japanese army's arrival. The rules that respect women were violated by acts such as coercion, kidnapping, rape, and to forcibly making them comfort women or Jugun ianfu. Japan could no longer bring in comfort women from their own country; so, instead, Japan had a policy to force women to serve as comforters for the needs of its soldiers in the brothels they set up. A government directive issued in 1938 stipulated that every battalion should have access to brothels, so that Japanese soldiers could concentrate on the war.

Local leaders sought ways to protect Minangkabau women from coercion, as Minangkabau culture holds women in high regard and is one of the world's largest matrilineal societies. In 1942, while in Padang, Sukarno discussed the matter with several ulama and gave permission to practice prostitution for Japanese soldiers. "Solely as an emergency measure, in order to protect our girls, I intend to make use of the prostitutes in this area. In this way, foreigners can satisfy their desires and the girls should not be disturbed", explained Sukarno. The granting of this permission was marked by the existence of brothels in several places in West Sumatra, such as Padang, Bukittinggi, and Payakumbuh. Generally, sex workers were non-West Sumatran women, most of them were women who were brought by the Dutch to work and their lives were neglected. Sukarno acknowledged that it was his administrative act as the de facto leader of the Indonesian people. He congratulated himself on "simultaneously enhancing the women's income, sating the lust of the invaders, and thereby protecting virtuous Minangkabau maidens."

Sukarno's granting of licenses to brothels was originally intended to stop the Japanese army from harassing West Sumatran women. The beginning of this program was to gather 120 prostitutes as "volunteers" to be penned in a special camp for service to Japanese soldiers. However, the number of women permitted to operate in Japanese camps was insufficient to serve the thousands of soldiers. "To get the comfort women provided, Japanese soldiers had to buy queue tickets. Even for one woman, there were up to four or six people queuing in one night", testified one Corporal Kaigun Heiho. The stark insufficiency as to the number of women available caused dissatisfaction among many Japanese soldiers, prompting them to coerce many West Sumatran women. To obtain women, the Japanese resorted to abduction and rape. They did not hesitate to take women even if they were married, regardless of whether they were sitting with their husbands at the time.

==== Sukarno exchanged for Madjid ====
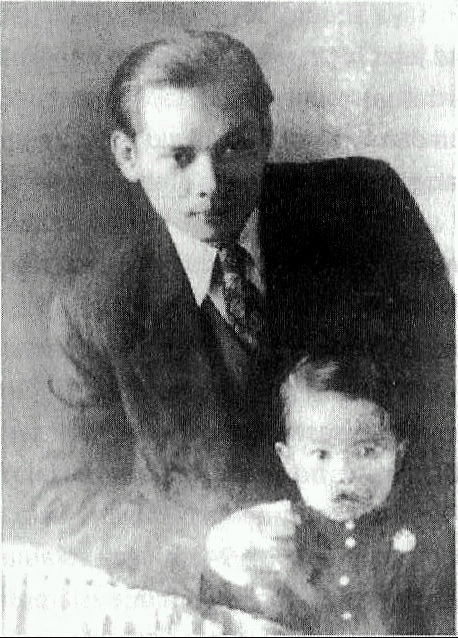
Madjid Usman and his son, Phirman, in Kōfu. Madjid Usman was highly regarded by Japanese officials and was seen as an equal.

Sukarno did not stay long in West Coast Sumatra. Initially, General Hitoshi Imamura, Commander-in-Chief of the Japanese 16th occupation army with headquarters in Djakarta, had ordered the top Indonesian leaders to form a civilian governing board. However, many hesitated without the guidance of Sukarno. Imamura sent a letter to Colonel Fujiyama stating, "The bulk of the occupied forces, as well as the governing head of these forces, are in Java. The real administrative task is here, and civilian affairs are not progressing well." The letter concluded in his ordering the immediate release of Sukarno. Minimal contact between the 25th Army and the 16th Army in Java prolonged Sukarno's stay in West Sumatra and reinforced the 25th Army's reluctance to cede Malaya during Yaheita Saito's tenure. Before Sukarno left for Java, Colonel Fujiyama and his assistant Ichitaro Wakamatsu arranged his safe return to Djakarta and also organized the return of Padang journalist Madjid Usman to West Sumatra, in return for the support Sukarno had received there. This exchange was made possible only after long negotiations that resulted to an agreement that was reached between the 16th and the 25th armies. The arrangement exchanged Sukarno, stranded in Minangkabau, for Madjid in Java. Madjid's stature as an Indonesian figure was initially seen by the Japanese as comparable to that of Sukarno. Once found by the 16th army by June 1942, Sukarno left by land to Palembang where he took a plane and went to Tanjung Priok in Java to lead the Indonesian independence struggle. It is believed that Sukarno derived the foundational principles of the first sila of the Pancasila, "Ketuhanan Maha Esa" (Belief in One Supreme God), from his experiences in West Sumatra. This concept is said to have been influenced by the teachings, advice, and conversations he had with Sheikh Abbas Abdullah.

Madjid Usman had been a Japanese sympathizer and was known to have had since the 1930s connections with the Japanese Embassy in Batavia and the Japanese government. At the time, he was known to have been the first Indonesian student to study in Japan, arriving in Kobe on 7 January 1933 to study at an Imperial University, specifically the Tokyo Imperial University. However, due to the Tokyo university's only allowing admission to those having graduated high school, he had been accepted to Meiji University. He was able to pursue an education in Japan with financial support and personal backing provided by Pan-Asianist politician, Tōyama Mitsuru. Madjid Usman, along with his friend Mahjuddin Gaus, later co-founded the Serikat Indonesia and joined several pro-Japanese Pan-Asian organizations as representatives of Indonesia. Through these roles, Usman established connections with members of the Japanese elite and government officials. After studying in Tokyo, he went back to the Dutch East Indies to work in a newspaper company as a redactor and as a teacher in Padang. He then married and became accustomed to life in Padang. He was later arrested and transported to Java after the Dutch Politieke Inlichtingen Dienst (PID) knew of his sympathies toward Japan. After the Battle of Java, he was released by the Japanese. After waiting for months in Java, barred from returning to Padang, Madjid was to be transported to Sumatra after an agreement between the 16th and 25th armies. After arriving in Padang, Madjid was met by Lieutenant Ichitaro Wakamatsu as the Hukukang (adjutant) to Acting Governor Colonel Fujiyama, and Lieutenant Utsumi of the Padang City Keibitai (Garnizun) who later became the head of Sendenhan (propaganda) Ito Butai Section. They asked Madjid to help in the administration of West Sumatra, which he refused and opted to instead be in an advisory position to the Shūchōkan. Understanding that his sympathies were with Japan but his not wanting to be labeled as a collaborator, the Japanese accepted his position as advisor and translator for the Shūchōkan. He was also placed as a redacteur for the Padang Nippo, then as the last Burgemeester of padang. After threatening to become a simple rice farmer to Shūchōkan Yano Kenzo, he would later become a founding member of the Centre for Research on Minangkabau Society and the Kerukunan Minangkabau.

=== Under Yano Kenzo's governorship ===
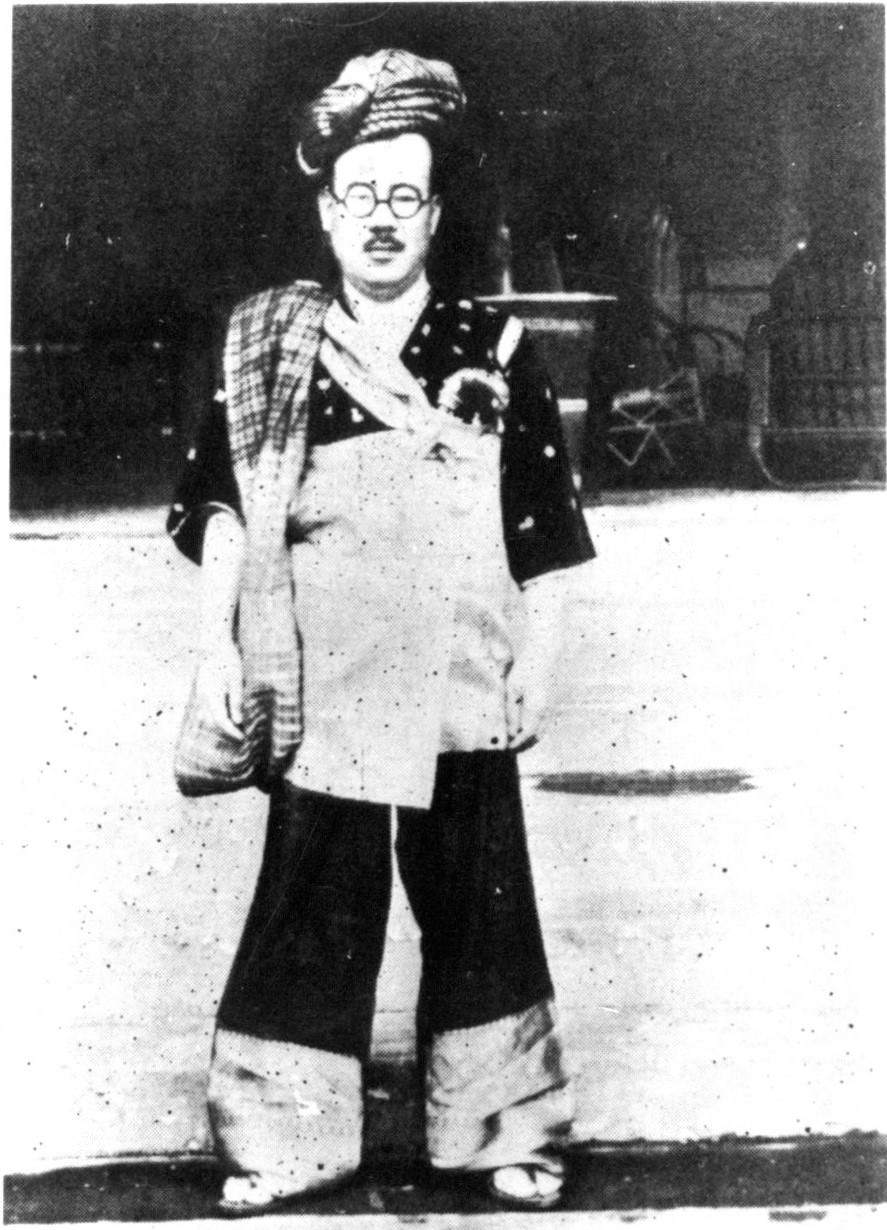
Governor of West Coast Sumatra, Yano Kenzo, dressed as Minang Pakaian raja in front of the shūchōkan's office in Padang, December 1942

The civil administration of West Sumatra only became effective after the arrival of Yano Kenzo to West Sumatra on 9 August 1942 as Governor of West Coast Sumatra, along with 68 other bureaucrats and administrators from the Japanese mainland who filled positions in the Bunshū and fuku bunshū. Before serving in West Sumatra, Yano had served as governor of Toyama Prefecture. Yano Kenzo became the only civilian leader in the Japanese-occupied areas of the Dutch East Indies, a notable exception, as most of the occupied territories in the archipelago were governed by local military commanders of the Japanese Imperial Army. Akira Oki noted that it was common for the civil administration to seek popular support through the minshin haaku policy ('winning the hearts of the people'; lit. 'to grasp or understand the minds of the people; by implication, to manipulate them'). The shūchōkan's role often had to balance its policy between minshin haaku and the military's whims; to avoid dissent from the civilian population or the Gunsireibu. Yano however heavily leaned on the minshin haaku policy, which stems from his career as a senior official at the Interior Department and as prefectural Governor.

Historian Gusti Asnan noted that Yano played a major role in achieving good cooperation between the people of West Sumatra and the Japanese. Yano opposed many policies of the 25th Army command, but maintained friendly relations with 25th Army commander Moritake Tanabe in Bukittinggi. Tanabe assumed that the population of Sumatra, due to its heterogeneous nature, would not be able to have local organizations in the same way as the 16th Army had facilitated in Java, where the majority of the population was ethnically Javanese. This assumption was based on the notion that the ethnic diversity of Sumatra would hinder the formation of unified, local groups, in contrast to the more homogeneous society in Java. Tanabe also had reservations about the increasing role of the Indonesian nationalist movement on Java, but responding to the "Koiso Promise" granting increased autonomy and eventual independence to Indonesia, which included all of the former Dutch East Indies, he established the Sumatra Central Advisory Council and trained locals for leadership roles, granting political concessions to Sumatra by reluctantly allowing it to form a Chūō Sangiin. However, he attempted to distance himself from local politics by as much as possible, leaving much scope, outside of Bukittinggi, to the civilian government of Yano Kenzo in Padang, which acted as an administrative city for development and public works affairs in the province.

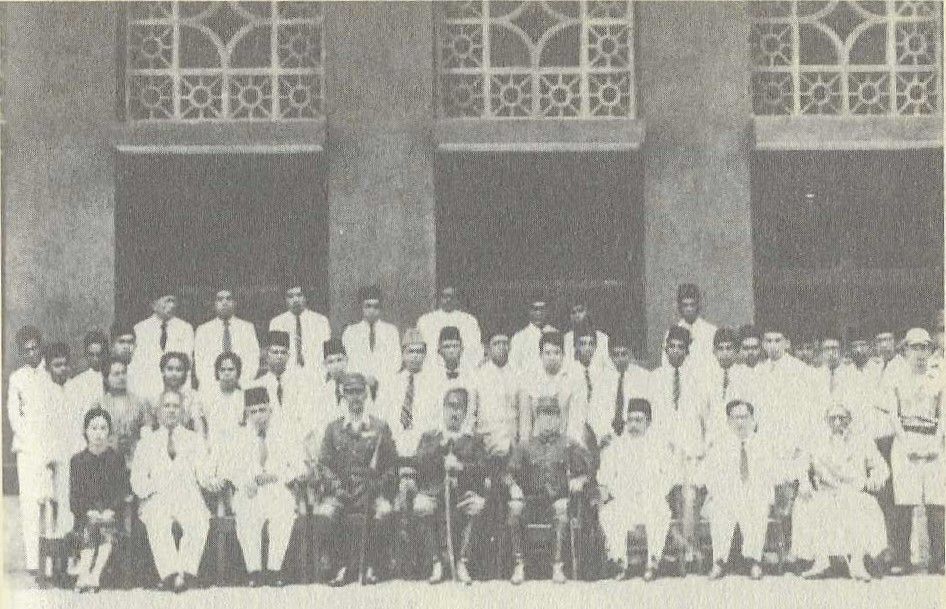
Members of Balai Pendidikan Masyarakat Minangkabau in front of the shūchōkan's office

Yano Kenzo's sympathy for the local people's aspirations for independence, and his disappointment with government policies that did not match his views, were expressed in an article he wrote in 1967. As a civilian leader, Yano Kenzo approached the Minangkabau people through respecting culture, rather than through force or authority as did his peers across occupied Asia. He had an interest in nature, society, and the customs of the Minangkabau, who adhered to a matrilineal tradition. His fascination on the Minangkabau people led him to study the culture and to write a book in February 1944. According to Gusti Asnan, his political views, which were influenced by his keen interest in the Minangkabau, became the basis for his idea to initiate the establishment of several civic, social, and cultural organisations in West Sumatra, earlier than any other residencies in Sumatra. Meanwhile, on the concerns regarding the significance of adat leaders and Islamic scholars in the political life of West Sumatra, Japanese authorities considered their inclusion in provincial administration to be necessary. As a result, Yano had personally established cultural-research platforms and religious organisations in West Sumatra as a way for the Japanese and locals (such as the Penghulu class) to learn more about the country's culture, traditions, and history, such as the Nine-member Customary Institution (Lembaga Adat Sembilan Anggota), the 56-membered Centre for Research on Minangkabau Society (Balai Penyelidikan Masyarakat Minangkabau) for the adat, and the 48+ membered Minangkabau Higher Islamic Council (Majelis Islam Tinggi; MIT) for Muslim leaders of the Minangkabau. Research within Balai Penyelidikan Masyarakat Minangkabau often tackle problems of administration related to culture, with results being presented to the shūchōkan. Minangkabau scholars, such as Rusad Datuk Perpatih Baringek, were invited to participate in cultural research organizations established by the Japanese authorities. For Yano Kenzo, this initiative served as a means to bring together the diverse components of West Sumatran society—including adat leaders, Islamic groups, the intelligentsia, nationalists, and even socialists—closer to the Japanese administration, with himself acting as a bridge between them. To facilitate this, Yano, alongside Colonel Fujiyama and Ichitaro Wakamatsu, organized routine discussions held at the shūchōkan's residence.

... The Minangkabau of Sumatra, under my jurisdiction ..., seem to be the most intelligent and economically advanced of all the tribes; and their political awareness is admirable. So, it is not surprising that they have a strong desire to end 350 years of Dutch oppression, and achieve full independence. Convinced that the Japanese occupation army would help them achieve their long-term dream, they co-operated. However, after two years of occupation, nothing changed.

— Yano Kenzo

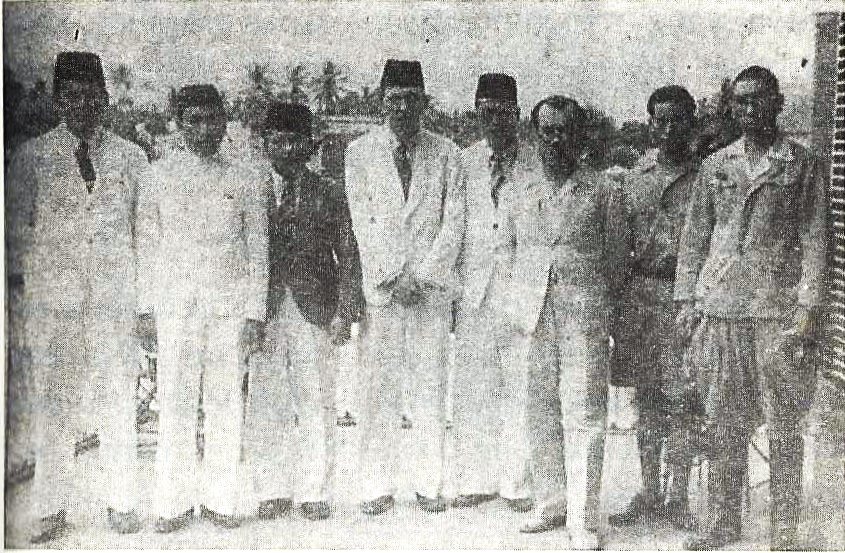
Photo of the Shū Sangi-kai. Yano Kenzo (third from the right) and Chatib Sulaiman (middle) can be seen

During his tenure as Governor of West Coast Sumatra, Yano established the Majelis Kesejahteraan Minangkabau (Consultative Council of Minangkabau) in July 1942 and later the Kerukunan Minangkabau (Gui Gan) as a consultation body between himself and Minangkabau leaders. The Kerukunan Minangkabau was established by Yano on 1 October 1942. Kerukunan Minangkabau met regularly at the governor's residence. With a membership of 10 to 20 people, representing districts, subdistricts, nagaris, adats, scholars, youth, the intelligentsia, ulamas, politicians, traditional leaders (including datuks), and academics, it acted as an informal advisory board to the shūchōkan. Yano seems to support government officials and adat-oriented people in number, however it's unclear how much each group is represented on the council as nationalist and youth activists, particularly Chatib Suleiman and Mohammad Sjafei, took charge of the discussions within the Kerukunan Minangkabau.

Gusti Asnan referred to Kerukunan Minangkabau as the early House of Representatives (DPR). When the 25th Army Command issued an order for the establishment of regional representative councils (Japanese: 州参議会, romanized: Shū Sangi-kai) in each shū on 8 November 1943, for the Central Advisory Council, the civilian government of West Sumatra continued the existing Kerukunan Minangkabau as a Shū Sangi-kai and, supported by the 25th Army, Mohammad Sjafei was appointed chairman. The primary distinction in its new form was its formal integration into the government apparatus and the expansion of membership, which now included 20 to 30 members, with the Japanese carefully balancing the representation of pergerakan (popular movements, both political and religious) with that of the pamong praja (civil administration) and keradjaan (traditional rulers). Within the council, Yano Kenzo allowed, and even insisted on, open criticism of any policy enacted by the local Japanese government for insight in governance, unheard-of within occupied Asia. Some prominent figures of West Sumatra who became its members were Chatib Sulaiman, Dt. Majo Urang, Syekh Jamil Jambek, Fachruddin H. S. Dt. Majoindo, and Darwis Dt. Majolelo. Meeting twice a year, the Shū Sangi-kai also responded to a list of politically innocuous questions from the shūchōkan.

=== Support from Minangkabau ulamas ===
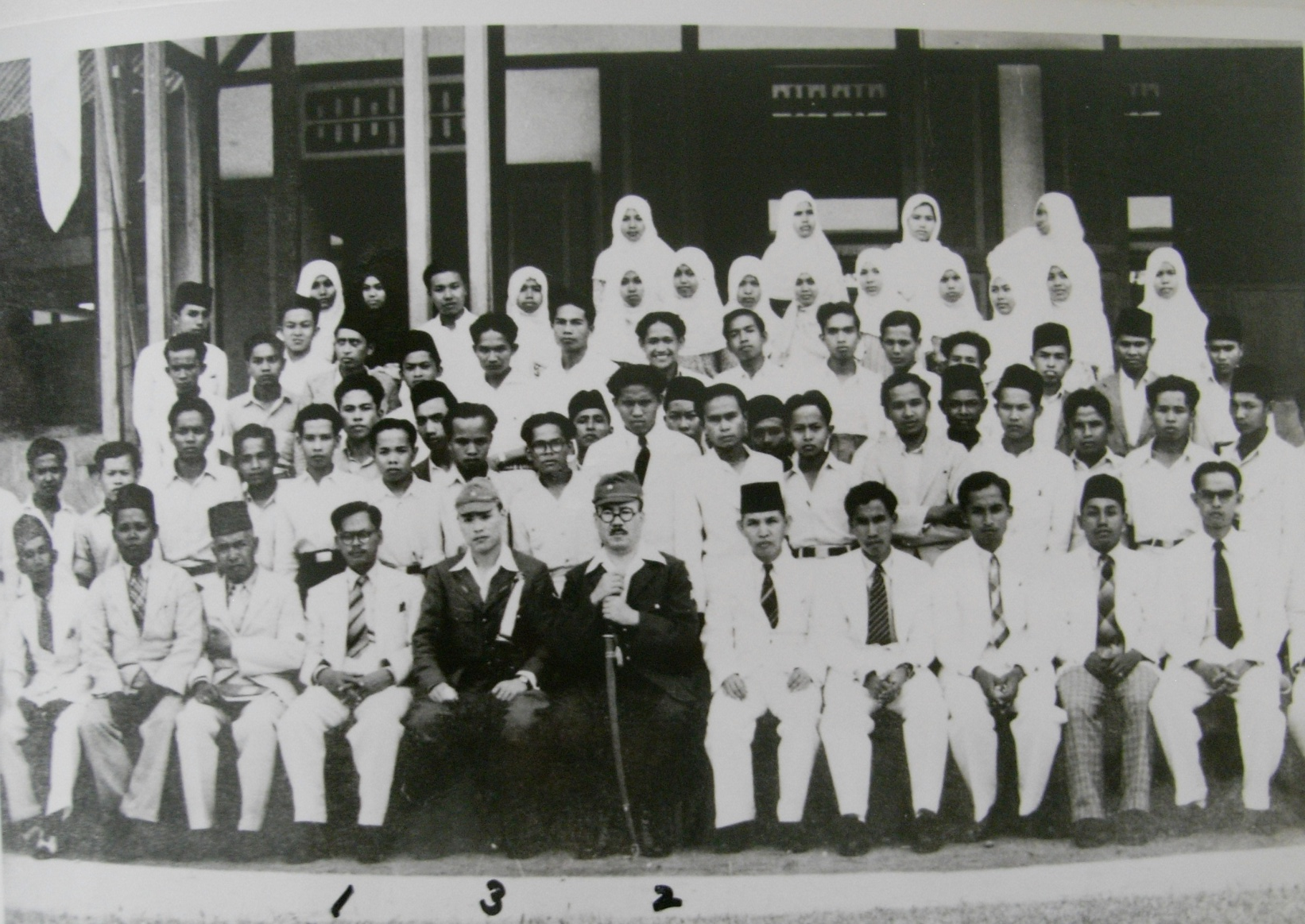
Madjid Usman (1), Governor Kenzo Yano (2), and Lieutenant Wakamatsu (3) pictured with teachers and students of Islamic College Padang in 1942

The occupation government adopted a different attitude toward Islamic groups compared to its approach to nationalist movements. Islam, practiced by almost the entire population of West Sumatra, had significant influence with the society. Recognizing that much of the resistance against Dutch rule in West Sumatra had been led by these religious groups, such as during the Padri War, the Japanese saw Islam as a useful tool to enhance their own influence with the West Sumatran community. Historian M.D. Mansur believes that this support stemmed from the beginning of the occupation. However, Akira Oki refuted that this support only came later, following the realization that appealing to the adat and nationalist groups, combined with the minshin haaku policy, was insufficient to gain broader public support.

Due to this tolerance, and in response to the transfer of power to the Japanese army, the shūchōkan Yano Kenzo and the Minangkabau ulamas (Islamic scholars) initiated the establishment of the Minangkabau Higher Islamic Council (MIT). The MIT was established under the leadership of Syekh Jamil Jambek, with Haji Mansur Daut and Datuk Panglimo Kayo serving as secretaries. Japan's lenient attitude toward the faith, religious practices, and traditions of the West Sumatran people was driven by the hope that Japan could use these elements as tools to further their own agenda. Specifically, the Japanization of West Sumatra through local beliefs and religion. In June 1943, prior to the establishment of the MIT, Yano decreed the allowance of the flying of the Muslim flag during Islamic holidays as to establish said connection. Ahmad Husein noted that this assembly was established as a forum where scholars deliberated on the politics of the Japanese government. Meanwhile, according to Datuk Palimo Kayo, the MIT was born thanks to the awareness of reformist ulamas about how dangerous Japanese rule was. Yano Kenzo and the occupation administration however, regarded the MIT primarily as a body for providing information and advice on Islam in West Sumatra. Shortly after its establishment, Yano created an Islamic section within the occupation government, the only such action in occupied Sumatra.

Established in 1942, the organisation elected Sulaiman Ar-Rasuli as chairman. With the aim of gathering all the forces of struggle of the Minangkabau Muslims, the MIT Minangkabau received the support of the entire Minangkabau people. This institution brought together the "two groups" of Islam in West Sumatra, the modernist-reformist "young group" and the conservative-traditionalist "old group"; namely the Muhammadiyah and Perti. Despite their cooperation within the framework of the shūchōkan, the leaders of these Islamic organizations were united in their resistance to Japanese political strategies. Even with accommodating policies, the Japanese attempted to introduce Shintoism, the state religion of Japan, but found little success among the Minangkabau people, who remained firmly rooted in Islamic teachings. As a result, religious leaders came under increasing scrutiny, with Japanese spies monitoring their activities. Many scholars remained steadfast in defending Islamic principles, viewing resistance as an act of religious martyrdom. As an act of concession, the Japanese authorities allowed the practice of Ramadhan and its related festivities by September 1942, such was enacted due to fears of congregation and or disturbance.

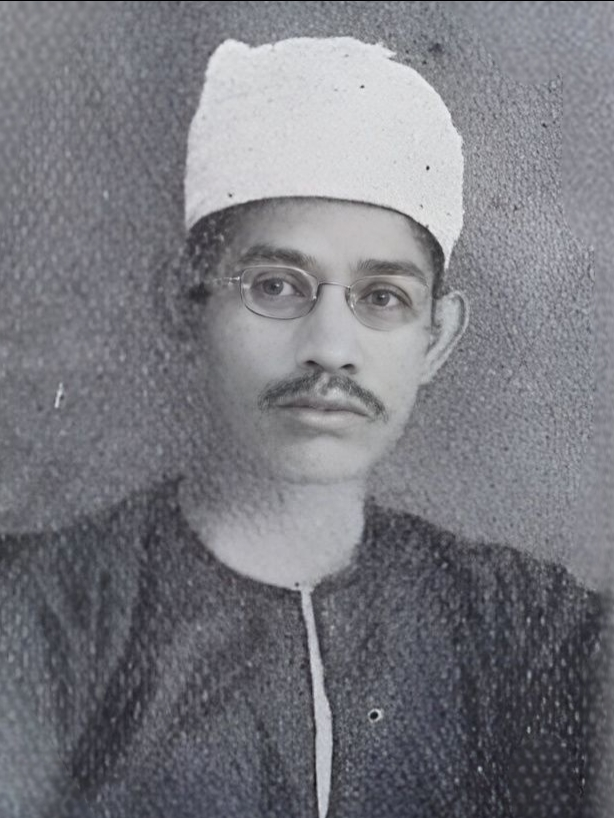
Through his close ties with the Japanese, Mahmud Yunus endeavoured to have Islamic religious education taught in West Sumatran government schools.

To gain acceptance of the people, the Japanese tried to approach the ulamas and give them a place in policy-making. The Japanese designed the formation of the Masyumi organisation at the centre. Religious Affairs Offices, called Shū Muka, were established in each prefecture. The clerics were given a special training programme called Kiyai Kōshūkai to prepare them to become Japanese propaganda tools. The "Principles Concerning Military Government in the Occupied Territories" (Senryōchi Gunsei Jisshi Yōkō) issued by the Japanese authorities on 14 March 1942 stated, "that religions should be respected as far as possible in order to keep the minds of the people stable... Muslims, should be given special attention in order to make use of them in order to grip the minds of the people". In Padang, prominent Islamic scholars were invited several times to attend meetings held at the city's most luxurious hotels of the time, such as Yamato Hoteru (now known as Hotel Muara). These gatherings were organized and attended by the shūchōkan and other high-ranking Japanese officials. The occupation government adopted a tolerant stance toward Islamic organizations such as Muhammadiyah, Perti, and others. They sought cooperation from ulamas, allowing them to continue their activities. Religious schools, including Muhammadiyah and Perti schools, were permitted to continue their educational efforts. The many madrasahs and suraus (Islamic study centers), which were dependent on their religious leaders for survival, were also allowed to carry on their educational and religious practices. Furthermore, the Japanese government promoted financial savings, a policy leveraged by Muhammadiyah to encourage investments in the Bank Muslimin Indonesia. Minangkabau clerics took advantage of the offer of cooperation with Japan to gather the strength of the Minangkabau Muslim struggle against the colonisers. The Japanese gave the Minangkabau MIT a place in policy-making, including appointing Mahmud Yunus, along with five others, to represent the Minangkabau MIT as a resident advisor. However its scope was limited to addressing Islamic religious issues, primarily resolving disputes among the people, and was strictly confined to non-political matters. In addition, several members of the assembly were invited to attend the Greater East Asia Islamic Congress (Muktamar Islam Asia Timur Raya) in Syonan (Singapore).

... The Dutch do not allow us to be soldiers for them, but the Japanese do. Entering the Giyu Gun will be useful for us to fight them.

— Syekh Abbas Abdullah

Despite encouraging the people to help the Japanese, the Minangkabau ulamas at the same time fostered the growth of Indonesian nationalism. They encouraged young men to attend military training organised by the Japanese. Together with traditional leaders, they were involved in the recruitment process of prospective Giyūgun officers to minimise the influence of Japanese propaganda and replace it with the spirit of nationalism. Historian Gusti Asnan noted that their involvement in the selection of officers was to select candidates who were 25 to 30 years old and insert the spirit of love for the country with the Giyūgun march. "They wanted the candidates to be mature enough to avoid the negative influence of the Japanese military upbringing." UIN Imam Bonjol academic Irhash A. Shamad stated that the pseudo-support given by Minangkabau scholars during Japanese rule blinded the Japanese in seeing what was behind the support. Community leaders together endeavoured to achieve Indonesian independence. According to Irhash, fighting openly against the Japanese at that time was wrong, so the scholars motivated the people to fight quietly "while taking refuge behind the support for the Greater East Asia War echoed by Japan." Notably, under the guise of attending the Greater East Asia Islamic Congress, representatives took the opportunity to meet, exchange ideas and opinions, and privately organize among Islamic organizations across the region, as intra-residential (Shū) communication was banned by the Japanese. Delegates from West Sumatra include Sulaiman ar-Rasuli (Bukittinggi), Ahmad Rasyid Sutan Mansur (Padang Padjang & Bukittinggi), Ibrahim Musa (Padang), and Sirayudin Abbas (Bukittinggi).

Reportedly, fearing increasing influence from the ulamas, Japanese authorities devised plans to eliminate these scholars. According to some accounts, their names were blacklisted, and mass graves were prepared for their execution. However, this plan was never carried out due to Japan's surrender in August 1945.

== Mobilization of the population ==
=== Formation of the Giyūgun ===
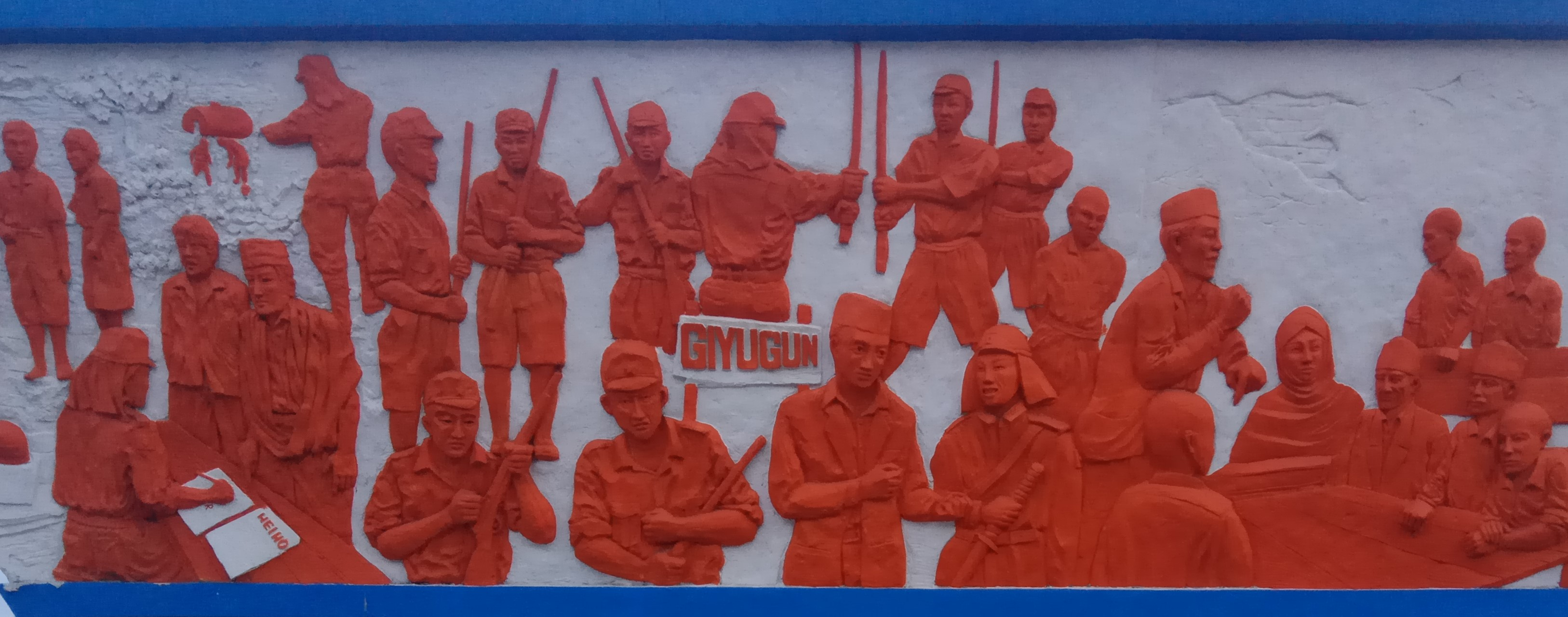
Relief at Tugu Padang Area, Padang. Depicting the enthusiasm of the people to join the Giyūgun

Within a year of the occupation, the Japanese shifted the focus of their policy from consolidating power and controlling the occupied areas in Southeast Asia to preparing to defend the region from Allied attack. Sumatra with its rich oil fields in Palembang and North Sumatra was particularly important in this regard. Strategically, Sumatra was also considered important due to its geographical position facing the Indian Ocean, especially the northern part of Sumatra's West Coast being the most vulnerable area to allied attacks from India and Ceylon. Admiral Nakamura, a high-ranking officer of the Imperial Japanese Navy, once remarked, "Retreat from Sumatra means losing the entire East Indies." From mid-1943, the Japanese anticipated an Allied counter-attack from Ceylon through the Andaman and Nicobar Islands. The Japanese military implemented a multi-layered defense strategy in Sumatra, focusing on coastal, lowland, and highland defenses. Facilities were constructed using local materials and natural features. For example, in Padang and Gunung Pangilun, defensive installations included bunkers and pillboxes strategically positioned along the coastline to prevent Allied amphibious landings. These structures utilized natural rock formations and materials such as reinforced concrete and coconut logs to withstand air raids and blend into the environment. These structures still exist today as the Mount Pangilun Japanese Bunker. Gun emplacements were also installed at key points, including the Mentawai Islands, which served as a forward defensive line. Consequently, the defense of Sumatra centered around the west coast, particularly the northwest coast, and on the islands of Nias and Sabang. Sumatra was then divided into four main military operational areas, each supported by its respective local garrison. However, the territorial responsibilities and functions of the Japanese military institutions underwent significant changes throughout the occupation. The 4th Division (Osaka) was stationed in Padang to counter potential attacks from the west and to serve as a reserve force for northern Sumatra. Additionally, the 25th Brigade in Tapanuli stationed a third of its troops on Nias Island and deployed a sizeable force to the Mentawai Islands. Even so, the Japanese 25th Army sought to mobilise the population for the Japanese cause.

In November 1943, the 25th Army headquarters planned how the Voluntary Army of the Southern Area Land Army Command would work. The plan called for formations in four separate areas (later one more area was added), with each of the four Giyūguns formed independently under different leadership. This reflected the relatively high degree of regional autonomy that characterised the Japanese occupation of Sumatra. At first the 25th army tried to use monetary inducement (under the Heiho project) to supplement its armed forces. The Heiho members were recruited through local pamong praja (civil administration) channels and were provided with a fixed wage or salary, creating the perception that they were "cheap mercenaries". Many Heiho themselves felt like second-class citizens due to the unfair treatment they received. The Japanese military had the authority to deploy them to battlefields anywhere, including Morotai, Burma (Myanmar), Malaya, Siam, and other regions. Some Heiho enlisted in West Sumatra were sent to the Morotai front, where they faced fierce Allied attacks. For Japan, the Heiho had both military and economic value, as thousands were deployed not only to battlefields but also to perform grueling physical labor on infrastructure projects in Burma, Thailand, and the Philippines. In Minangkabau, young men showed little interest in joining the Heiho, resulting in low enlistment numbers. To compensate, candidates were brought in from neighboring regions such as Tapanuli to fill the ranks. The Heiho became infamous for the immense suffering they endured on various battlefields, often deployed under harsh conditions and facing significant dangers with little support. A significant number of Heiho never returned home after the war. Many lost their lives in combat or succumbed to the extreme conditions of projects such as the construction of the Thailand-Burma railway, which became infamous for its harsh conditions and high death toll. Eventually, the experiences of Heiho recruits became a grim symbol of the hardship faced by the Minangkabau intending to support Japan's wartime efforts. By May 1943, the system failed to bring results; with General Masazumi Inada, the architect of the native army across the Southern area, concluding that the Heiho units could not solve problems and even tended to jeopardise Japan's defense.

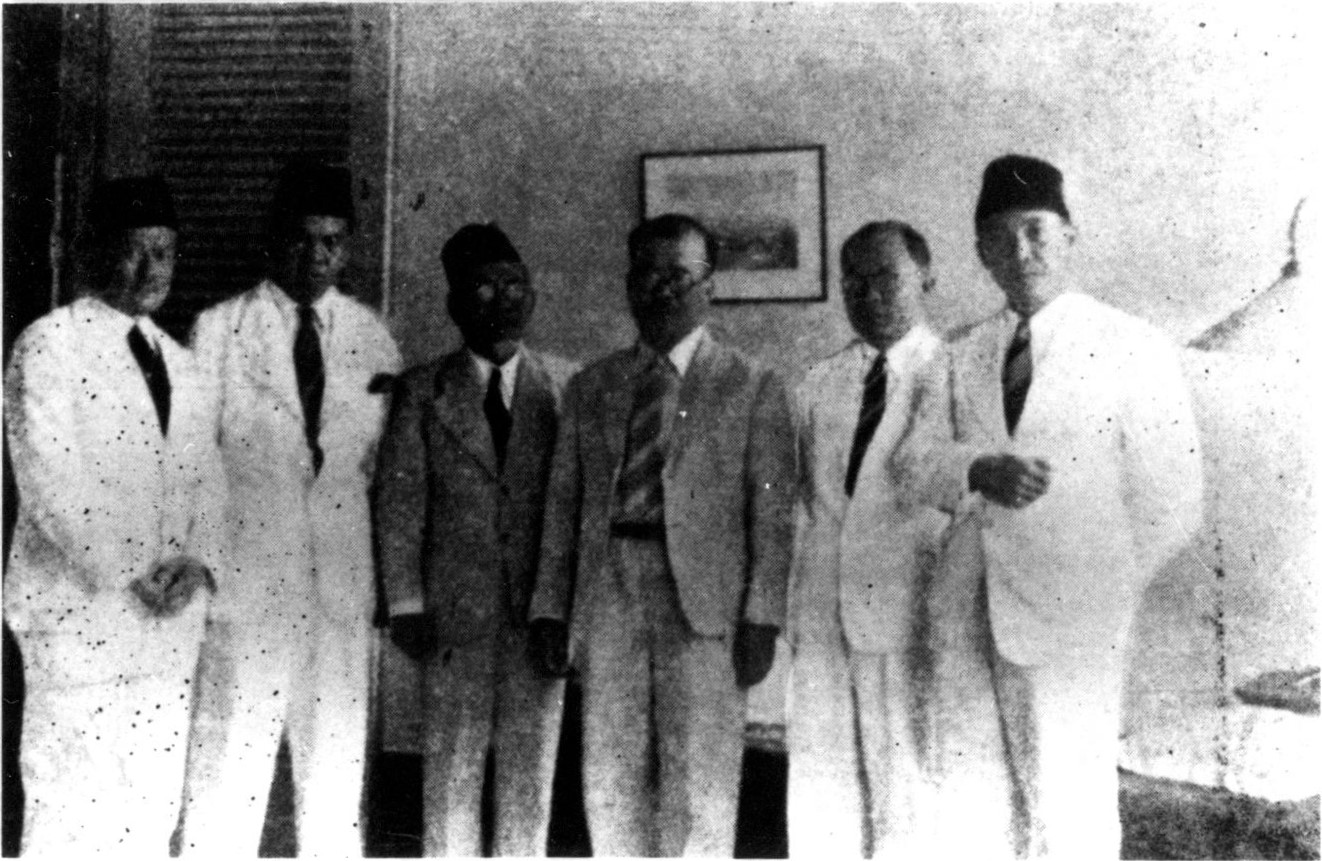
Yano Kenzo with the Founding Fathers of Indonesia. (left to right, Ali Sastroamidjojo, Mohammad Yamin, Agus Salim, Yano Kenzo, Mohammad Hatta, and Sukarno.)

Chatib Sulaiman proposed to Yano Kenzo the formation of a native army in West Sumatra as a way to supplement the strength of the Japanese army. Meetings between the Kerukunan Minangkabau and Yano Kenzo lasted days with members carefully choosing words that could convince Governor Yano of this idea. Governor Yano Kenzo came to understand that it was hope for independence, not money, that drove the natives to fight and so suggested the idea to Tanabe in Bukittinggi. Under a personal agreement, in February 1943, Tanabe would agree with Yano's proposal. After this deal, Yano went to Jakarta to meet with Sukarno, Hatta, Yamin, and a few other national leaders to talk about the matters of independence, and other relevant issues. Similarly, in August 1943 General Tanabe met with General Inada regarding the shortcomings of the Heiho units. During this discussion, Inada proposed the creation of a similar native formation. After the Army Command based in Saigon, Vietnam, issued an order to form a Kyōdo Bōei Giyūgun (known better as the Pembela Tanah Air; PETA) on 8 September 1943, the 25th Army Commander, Tanabe, gave full authority to the Governor of West Sumatra to implement the formation of a native army. And so, in September 1943 the joint establishment of the Giyūgun in Malaya and Sumatra was sanctioned by the Imperial General Headquarters and the Southern Army Staff headquarters. The Southern Army Staff, under the direction of Colonel Kaizaki, in September 1943 prepared an Outline for the Organisation of the Native Armies.

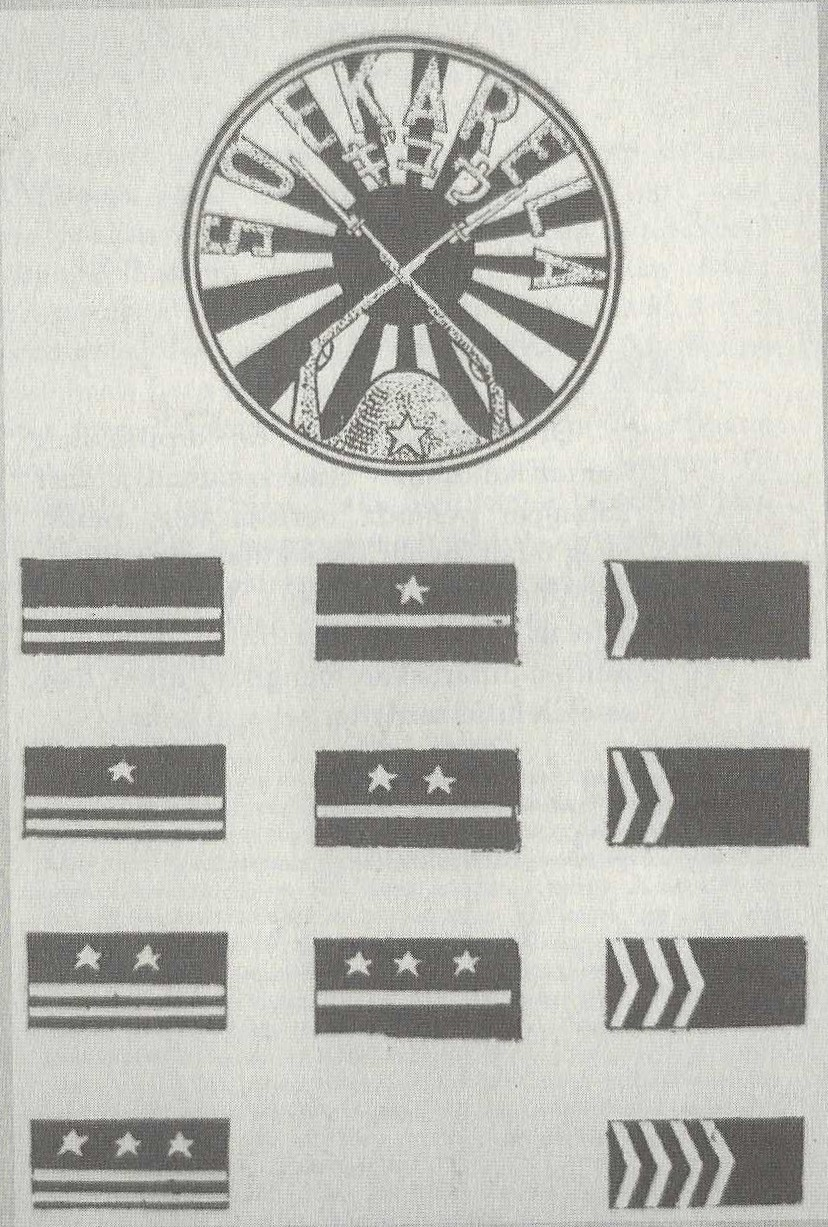
Giyūgun Sumatora Icon and Rank

Yano Kenzo then convened a session of the Kerukunan Minangkabau on 27 September 1943 to address Tanabe's reply. In the meeting, he declared, "The time has come for the Indonesian nation to rise up to defend its homeland. The license to establish a voluntary army has been authorized... so that the defense of the island of Sumatra will be further strengthened." Following the meeting, a committee was formed to establish the Giyūgun (Volunteer Army) in Padang. In the same meeting however, Yano Kenzo disagreed on giving the formation an Indonesian name, specifically forbidding the name Pembela Tanah Air (PETA) unlike its counterpart in Java. It is thought that this was due the 25th Army's reluctance to give or surrender any type of authority of Sumatra to any other parties, especially those from the 16th Army. Thus the Giyūgun (Indonesian: Laskar Rakjat, Japanese: 義勇軍, lit. 'Volunteer Army') was established in Sumatra. The reasons why there are two names for the formation, Laskar Rakyat (People's Army) and Giyūgun (Volunteer Army), was due to the difficulty of translating the words from Indonesian to Japanese. Additionally, Yano Kenzo's believed that the Japanese would be unlikely to relinquish control over Sumatra and that a process of Japanization would eventually be established in the region as time progressed. In historian Joyce Lebra's analysis, Japan did not plan to recognize independence until late in the war, a stance only announced in July 1945. In Malaya and Sumatra, the Japanese employed the term giyūgun (voluntary army) rather than doku-ritsugun (independence army), the latter used for the Burmese Independence Army. The details of the committee's composition were later reported by the Kita Sumatora Shimbun on Monday, 2 October 1943. Later, the Giyūgun Kensetsu Honbu engaged in propaganda for the Giyūgun through newspapers, radio, films, and mass meetings. The association also assisted in the recruitment of cadres. Soon after, an association called Giyūgun Kensetsu Honbu (Headquarters for the Establishment of the Giyūgun) was established in Padang on 5 October 1943 with Chatib Suleiman, a nationalist figure, as its chairman. Given the opportunity, Yano Kenzo used this mass recruitment campaign to help and promote the propagation of the ideals of Indonesian independence in West Sulawesi.

On 10 October 1943, a significant gathering for the announcement of the Giyūgun took place in the courtyard of the shūchōkan's residence in Bukittinggi. The event, attended by thousands, included notable figures such as Chatib Sulaiman and Mahmud Junius, alongside Japanese officials such as the Butai-tyo (company commanders). Prominent Islamic clerics, including the Chairman of the Higher Islamic Council (MIT) Inyiak Sheikh Sulaiman ar-Rasuli (Candung), Sheikh Mohammad Djamil Djambek, and Engku Sutan Mangkuto from Muhammadiyah, also participated. During the event, propaganda was openly disseminated to encourage participation in the Giyūgun. Yano Kenzo delivered a speech emphasizing the dual use of spiritual and martial commitment, stating, "If you gentlemen hold the Qur'an in your right hand, then hold this sword in your left hand [while raising a katana]. The sword in your left hand is to be wielded to vanquish the enemy." Yano Kenzo's speech and prose had at one point significantly influenced Sheik Djamil Djambek's style of speechmaking and later Khutbahs' on the topic of the Giyūgun. During an event on 12 October 1943, Djambek adopted a similarly impassioned style to encourage participation in the Giyūgun. Speaking with emotion, he brandished a drawn karih from his sarung and said, "My heart is heavy with sorrow because I am old and no longer strong enough to stand firmly. Yet, I firmly believe that the youth, descendants of our nation's heroes, will not neglect their duty to defend and protect their homeland, as enjoined by their religion."

==== Giyūgun Padang ====
On 14 October 1943, Chatib Sulaiman pioneered the formation of a committee for the formation of the Giyūgun called Giyūgun Koenkai. To support this effort, Sulaiman traveled extensively around West Sumatra, recruiting prospective Giyūgun officers, and frequently shuttling between Padang and Bukittinggi. This committee, under Japanese supervision, screened prospective volunteer officers. In accordance with the structure of Tungku Tigo Sajarangan, a traditional Minangkabau leadership institution, the responsibility of recruiting prospective Giyūgun officers was handed over to three prominent leaders of West Sumatran society, namely Sulaiman, representing the cerdik pandai; Ahmad Datuk Simaradjo, representing the ninik mamak; and Hadji Mahmud Junus, representing the alim ulama. Together, they convinced the officers that the military training provided by the Japanese was aimed at achieving Indonesian independence. Young men in Minangkabau were encouraged to become Giyūgun troops and to receive military training from the Japanese. With the encouragement of traditional and religious leaders, many young men registered. Among those were Dahlan Djambek, Ismail Lengah, Syarif Usman, Dahlan Ibrahim, Syofyan Nur, Syofyan Ibrahim, A. Talib, Nurmatias, Sayuti Amin, Alwi St. Marajo, Syefei Ali, Mahyuddin Tonek, Burhanuddin, Munir Latief. There were around 20,000 who applied for the Giyūgun, but only 1,000 rations were available. Encouragement for the development of the Giyūgun was given by Yano at a large meeting on 20 November 1943 at the shūchōkan's residence in Bukittinggi, involving the participation of heads of nagari (village-level administrative units) and the penghulu (headman) class, considered the most influential layer of Minangkabau society. The Japanese battalion commander (Butai-tyo) had emphasized West Sumatra's potential manpower, stating: "Here in Minangkabau, there are about 20,000 people by calculation. If each penghulu sends one agile and intelligent youth as a laskar (warrior), there would be 20,000 warriors to defend the homeland." The gathering included thousands of penghulu from the Luhak Nan Tigo (the three core regions of traditional Minangkabau) and 460 nagari leaders. Several prominent ninik-mamak (customary elders), including the head of Nagari Balingka, the chief of Barulak Nagari, Datuk Paduko Batuah, and Datuk Singo Mangkuto (a leader of the Indonesian Islamic Union Party), were invited to speak. Thus, Yano was able to influence the penghulu, who had been able to recruit at least another 20,000 soldiers from his descendants. The meeting culminated in a resolution affirming the ninik-mamak's support and agreement to take responsibility for the formation of the Giyugun at the village level. The call of the penghulu was well received.

During the initial round of enlistment, many individuals applied to join the Giyugun training center in Padang. However, the number of applicants accepted was strictly limited. For the officer-candidate category, no more than 50 individuals were admitted. The requirements for officer candidates were particularly stringent. In addition to meeting health requirements and educational standards, candidates were also assessed based on the social status of their parents. Connections to, or networks within, the system were considered an important factor in the selection process. The selected officer candidates were later promoted to the rank of company commander. The next category comprised candidates for non-commissioned officers (NCOs), with a larger intake than for officer candidates. For the first cohort, eight han (classes or sections) were formed, each consisting of 60 participants. These candidates were trained to serve as section or squad commanders. The selection process for participants was conducted by a joint committee of Japanese and Indonesian staff under the Giyūgun Kensetsu Honbu. In addition to requirements concerning social status, education, and health, candidates were generally expected to be between 25 and 30 years old. However, in practice the age requirement was not strictly enforced. Chatib Sulaiman had hoped that the first cohort of Giyūgun officers would be able to critically and skeptically engage with Japanese values. He believed this approach would prevent Japanese ideologies from unduly influencing the overall mindset of the Giyūgun trainees. Following the selection process, only 34 cadets graduated as officers. For the non-commissioned officer training program, approximately 250 to 300 participants were admitted. The Giyūgun units established in Sumatra, Malaya, Indochina, and Kalimantan were primarily tasked with supplementary roles, including coastal defense and guard duties. These units addressed personnel shortages in these capacities and were intended to counter or delay any potential Allied offensives in Sumatra. However, they were not designed as combat-ready military units. Further evidence of this distinction is the minimal involvement of graduates from Nakano Gakkō, the Japanese military intelligence training school, in the training of the Sumatran and Malayan Giyūgun. This reflects the limited emphasis on political warfare objectives within these units, as such objectives were only sporadically relevant. Sumatra's significance to Japan stemmed from its strategic location, military importance, and critical resources, particularly oil. Consequently, no Tokumu Kikan or Nakano Gakkō graduate groups were deployed to the island. Japanese policy for Sumatra emphasized long-term ownership and that included keeping the population in check.

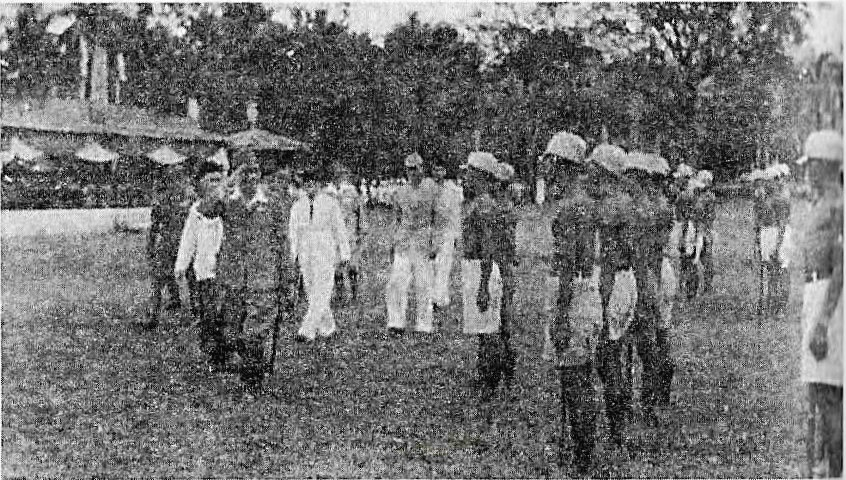
Opening of the First Giyūgun (Laskar Rakyat) Training Center in Padang

The Giyūgun Koenkai became the only military force established by the Japanese in West Sumatra. The Giyūgun force was initially formed in Padang and the coastal areas, trained by the 37th Infantry Regiment of the 4th Osaka Division in 1943. The Giyūgun Section (Giyū-han) led by Major Akiyama was formed within the division staff office. In January 1945, when the 4th Division was transferred to Thailand, the 25th Combined Brigade was transferred from Tapanuli and stationed in the Padang area. With this change, the Giyūgun was placed under the command of this newest Japanese garrison. Afterwards, the name of the Giyūgun Kensetsu Honbu was changed to Giyūgun Koenkai (Giyūgun Support Association) and other nationalist figures such as Muhammad Sjafei and Suska also joined. With the help of this organisation, qualified young men were selected as potential cadres. Finally, training began in Padang in February 1944. Training included marching, Judo, Kendo, Japanese language, and Seishin lectures. According to Lebra, the propaganda emphasis was on fighting for one's country and co-operating with Japan in the Greater East Asian neighbourhood. The training of candidates began in two batches at Bukit Ambacang in Bukittinggi.

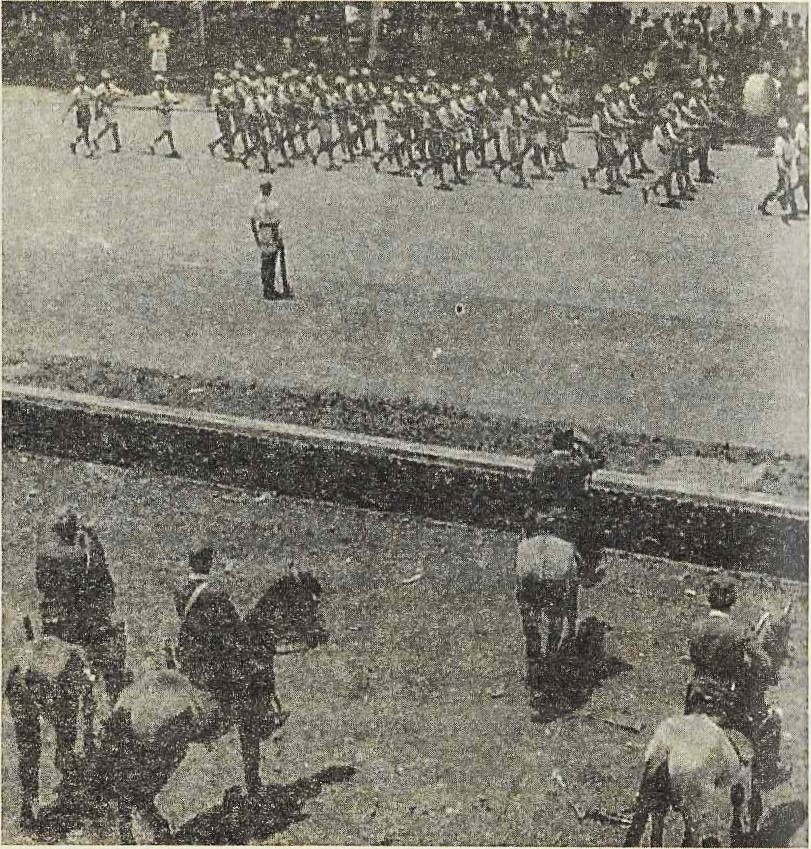
Giyūgun troops in Padang on parade

During Dutch rule, the Minangkabau people had very little experience in the Royal Netherlands East Indies Army (KNIL). This was partly due to the Minangkabau culture not emphasizing military careers. The people of Sumatra, outside of Aceh, historically have had very little military tradition or culture. Also, the Dutch's perceived strong Indonesian nationalist sentiments within the Minangkabau culture, and thus did not allow the Minangkabau people in the KNIL. The absence of a strong military tradition significantly influenced the character and career of the officers who graduated from Giyūgun Sumatora. These officers were known for their puritanical approach, emphasizing professionalism and prioritizing the national Indonesian character and military values over the traditional Javanese priyayi military culture. This distinction set them apart as a new type of officers focused on national rather than regional or aristocratic military ideals. According to Audrey Kahin, only one of those recruited as Giyūgun cadres, Ismael Lengah, had received formal Dutch military training as a member of the Stadswacht, the city guard established in Padang in the last months of Dutch rule. Therefore, Giyūgun training provided an important missing element, if any realistic opportunity for West Sumatrans to oppose a repeat of the Dutch hold on the area.

In May 1944, after three months of training, the cadres were sent to their place of appointment and began organising their companies by recruiting local soldiers. At the time of the Japanese surrender, four infantry companies (in Talu, Pariaman, Painan, and Padang), a machine gun company (in Emmahaven), a mortar company (in Padang), and a howitzer platoon (in Lubuk Kilangan) were organised in the West Coast Residency under the auspices of the 4th Division. Since a company consisted of about 200-250 soldiers, the number of soldiers at the end of the war was estimated at 1,500–2,000. Yano Kenzo wrote that the number of qualified applicants was very high, while the quota prepared by the army was only about a thousand. Each company had several platoons and was stationed in different places, though the majority was stationed in Padang, as the Japanese army initially prioritized coastal defense. Under the 4th Division, its main base was led by Captain Sasaki and, later, by Major Akiyama.

==== Giyūgun Bukittinggi-Si Yaku Sho ====
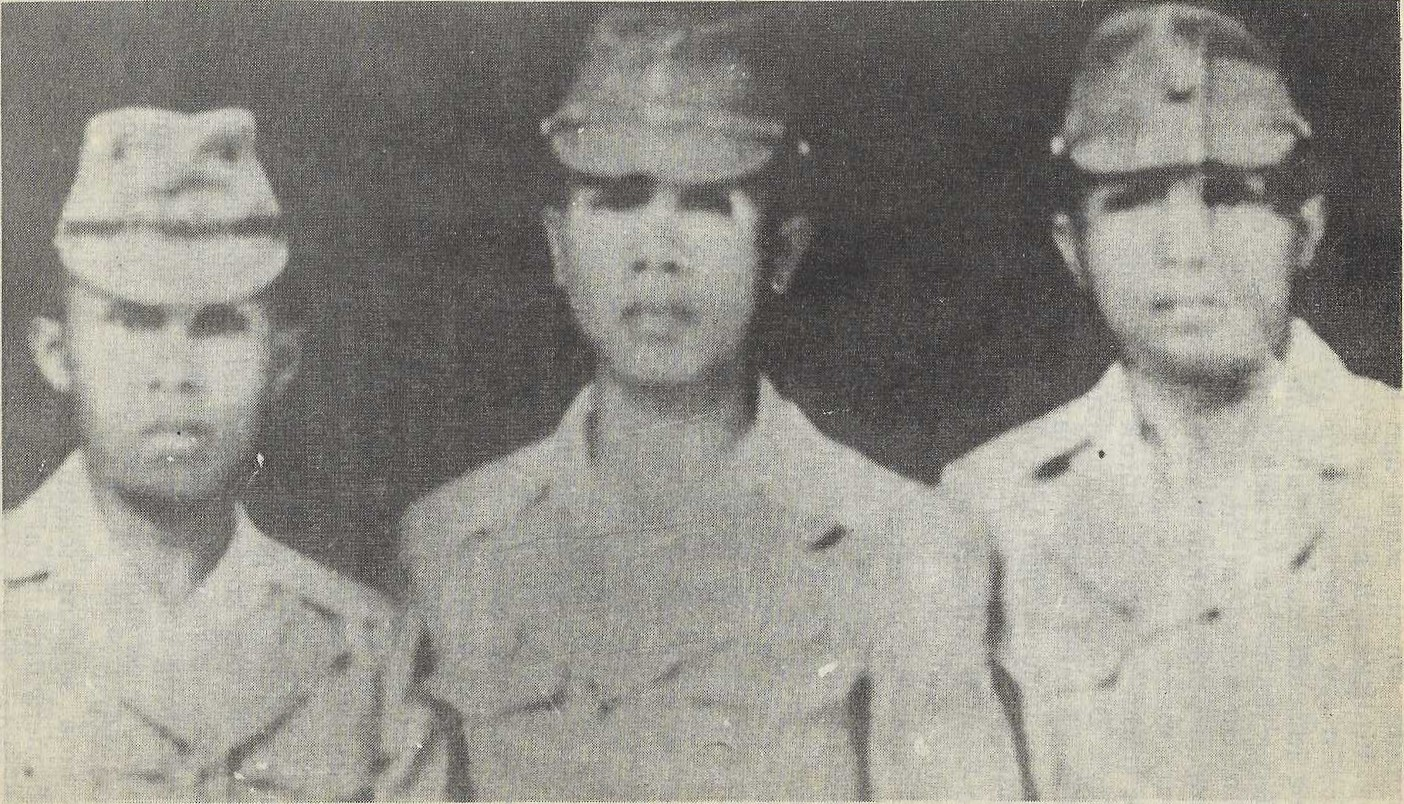
Hassan Basri, Abdul Halim, and Abunawas during the induction of 11 Giyūgun officers in Bukittinggi on 11 July 1945.

The 25th Army initially did not deem it necessary to establish a dedicated military training center in Bukittinggi. To the 25th Army, the purpose of establishing the Giyūgun (Volunteer Army) was to address Japan's immediate military defense needs, particularly to strengthen the defense lines in coastal areas. Padang, as the main and most strategically significant city on the west coast of Sumatra, served as the primary stronghold against a potential Allied invasion from the Indian Ocean, which was expected to target the Japanese occupation's central command in inland Bukittinggi. Secondly, Japanese forces already stationed in Bukittinggi were considered sufficient to manage any immediate military tasks in the area. Consequently, the Japanese military government prioritized increasing the number of coastguard personnel in Padang and other coastal regions, over establishing a training facility in Bukittinggi. But as the war became increasingly unfavourable for Japan, it became necessary to strengthen defences around the 25th Army headquarters by building fortifications in the mountainous interior. Thus, a separate Giyūgun group was organised in the Bukitinggi area. In October 1944, under the direct supervision of the 25th Army headquarters, the Giyūgun's formation was about a year later than the other Sumatran Giyūguns. Cadre training began in October 1944 with 200‒300 cadets at Bukit Ambacang, on the outskirts of Bukitinggi. After the training, 35 cadets were appointed as non-commissioned officers. All cadets were then divided and organised into 8 companies in the interior of West Sumatra. The Bukittinggi Giyūgun troops were strategically stationed across several locations. Gulai Bancah, Baso, Padang Panjang, Koto Baru, and Batusangkar, with each site primarily hosting infantry corps. Baso also housed an engineering corps, while Padang Panjang served as the base for the communication corps. Additionally, there was also another artillery company and an engineering company. All companies were placed under command of the Bukittinggi Defence Garrison (Bukittinggi Bo'eitai) under the 25th Army with Colonel Harada as commander. The 35 non-commissioned officers were then recalled and received further training. Eight were promoted to second lieutenant (shōi), three to high non-commissioned officer (Jun'i), and the rest to sergeant major (sōchō).

==== Auxiliaries and officer education ====
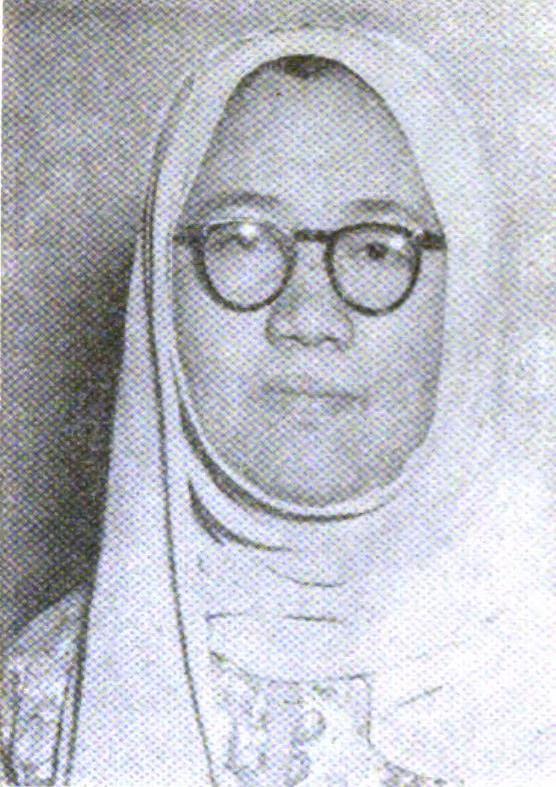
Rasuna Said, a Permi figure, led the women's movement through the Haha No Kai organisation during occupation.

Japanese propaganda intensified in 1944. Various groups were united in the Hōkōkai, led by Mohammad Sjafei and Chatib Sulaiman from the nationalist movement; Datuk Parpatih Baringek and Datu Majo Uang from the tradition group; and Djamil Djambek and Sutan Mansur from the religious group. The Giyūgun Koenkai (later supported by the Giyūgun Koenbu), an association of Giyūgun supporters, was formed as a liaison between civilian and military leaders. The organisation had its headquarters in Jalan Belantung, Padang, and established branches in all districts, sub-districts, and nagari. Haha No Kai, the women's wing of the Giyūgun led by Rasuna Said and Ratna Sari, was established to prepare supplies for the officers. The women's activities included collecting donations of rice from the community, from the savings of a handful of rice to be cooked each day. By the time of the proclamation of independence, the Giyūgun had organised two drills for its officers. The first batch included Ismael Lengah, Dahlan Djambek, Sjarief Usman, Dahlan Ibrahim, A. Talib, Sjofjan Ibrahim, Munir Latief, Kasim Datuk Malilit Alam, Nurmatias, and Ahmad Hussein. The second batch included Kemal Mustafa, Sjoeib, and Zaidin Bakry. In 1945, 11 Giyūgun second lieutenants and three young lieutenants were appointed in Bukittinggi and four second lieutenants in Padangpanjang. At the same time, 20 officer candidates were appointed with the rank of sergeant-major (sōchō). These Giyūgun units were then organised into companies and allocated along the coast of West Sumatra, from Muko-Muko to Tiku. As the first professional military organization in Sumatra, the Giyūgun adhered to certain qualitative standards typical of professional military institutions, shaped heavily by Japanese influences. Two key variables, control and skills, defined these standards. Training, overseen by Japanese instructors, operated on two levels of organizational control. First, internal control where officer candidates were trained to maintain harmony within the officer corps, both as a professional and social group. Second, external control enforced discipline based on rank and authority, marking a hierarchical structure. Skills, particularly proficiency, were prioritized above all else. While traditional attributes of a professional soldier, such as courage and discipline, were valued, the Japanese occupation government added an additional criterion; the ability to lead society. This focus on societal leadership extended the role of soldiers beyond the battlefield and into civic and societal influence. This framework laid the foundation for the concept of a career ladder in the modern Indonesian military tradition.

Apart from the Giyūgun officer education, the Japanese army in West Sumatra also educated 11 candidates from the Chūgakkō (lit. 'Middle school') in Padang. Among them were Hasnan Habib and Munafri Munaf. For village security guards, Bogodan, as well as assistance personnel for the police, Keibuho, were also trained. One notable former Keibuho member was Kaharuddin Datuk Rangkayo Basa, who later became the first governor of West Sumatra in an independent Indonesia in 1958. During the Japanese occupation, he rose to the rank of Keishi (district chief of police) after undergoing training in Syonan (Singapore), funded by first governor of West Sumatra, Yano Kenzo. The structure of governance under Japanese occupation in Indonesia was inherently military in nature. As a result, all governmental functions, including policing, operated under military authority. The territorial divisions of the police were aligned with the military's jurisdiction. The methods and actions of the police during this period resembled those of a police state (Politie Staat). Public fear of law enforcement was pervasive under the Japanese occupation. Various forms of policing introduced during Dutch colonial rule were abolished, leaving only a singular civilian police structure in Indonesia. Taking account to auxiliaries and other formations, Brigadier General Saafroedin Bahar estimated the total number approved for training at 5,000 people.

=== Allied attacks and native rebellions ===
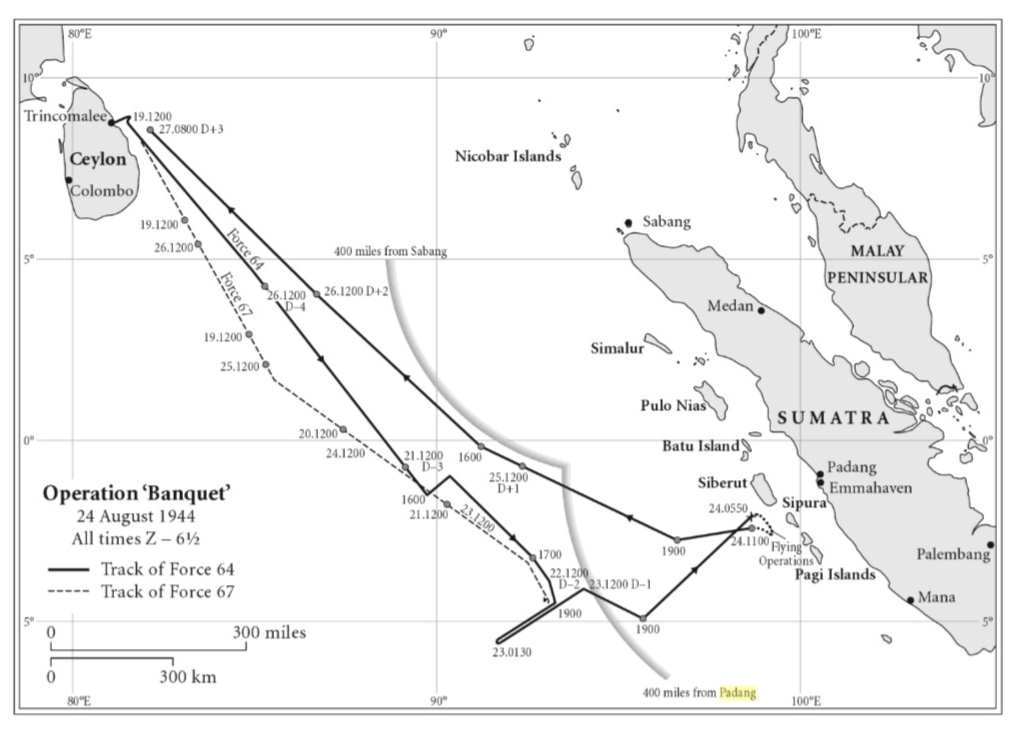
Track of British Task Force 64 during Operation Banquet

On 24 August 1944, Japanese planners correctly assessed an Allied attack originating from Ceylon as Operation Banquet. However, the attack took the form of minor bombing raids rather than an amphibious landing as Japanese planners expected. Commanded by Rear Admiral Clement Moody, the operation included bombing raids over Japanese positions in and around Padang, targeting the Padang airfield, the Indaroeng cement works, and the harbor facilities and shipping at Emmahaven. The second Allied attack on Emmahaven took place in March 1945 at 06:30. This attack lasted about 20 minutes, bombing and shelling ships that were docked and loading coal. As a result, three ships were sunk and many "coolies" who were working to load coal were killed. On the Japanese side, several Kaigun (navy) men were killed. During the Allied attacks on Indarung, Tabing airfield, and Emmahaven, Giyūgun units participated for the first time, without suffering any casualties. The village of Air Bangis also experienced cannon fire from Allied warships, mostly aimed at the hills and boats at anchor. This Allied gunfire did not meet with the slightest resistance on the part of the Japanese soldiers, as they were mainly manning and preparing positions inland for a possible Allied landing, which did not happen. The Allied warships departed after sinking the boats. In reality, the Allies had largely avoided the Dutch East Indies and opted to focus on the Central Pacific and the South-West Pacific, as previously agreed upon at the Casablanca Conference.

Another incident involved a company of Giyūgun soldiers stationed in Mukomuko, where Dahlan Ibrahim, a prominent independence figure, once served as the vice commander. Ibrahim had been responsible for forming Giyūgun companies since his stationing in Painan, eventually being based in Mukomuko until the Japanese surrender. The Mukomuko Giyūgun company received a report from the Seinendan, a pemuda paramilitary organization, about a suspicious light seen at sea. Upon investigation, it was discovered that an Allied submarine had dropped off some men in a small boat. The Giyūgun soldiers immediately fired upon the boat. After the submarine disappeared, the body of an Australian soldier who had apparently been dropped off as a spy in Mukomuko was found. This event was likely from the actions of the Dutch Korps Insulinde, where the battalion organized infiltration and intelligence gathering operations in occupied Sumatra.

In the closing stages of World War II, economic hardship imposed by the 25th Army and widespread pressure felt by the people of Sumatra led to growing disillusionment and discontent toward the Japanese occupying forces. This unrest prompted some to take up arms against the occupying forces. In South Sumatra, Giyūgun officers held secret meetings in Lahat in December 1944 and January 1945, planning to launch an armed rebellion at an opportune moment across the province. However, the plan was thwarted when the Japanese army discovered the plot. In July 1945, Giyūgun members in Pematang Siantar, led by 1st Lieutenant Hopman Sitompul Siantar, openly defied orders from Japanese officers and trainers, intending to continue and escalate the resistance into an armed rebellion. This effort, however, was swiftly suppressed when Sitompul was arrested by the Kempetai and detained in Bukittinggi. Meanwhile, in Bukittinggi itself, various youth groups and nationalist factions began rallying to form an anti-Japanese resistance movement. Seeking independence, these groups operated both covertly and openly, as public sentiment turned increasingly against the Japanese, particularly with the realization that the Allies were gaining the upper hand in the war.

== Increasing control ==
As tensions in the Pacific War escalated, Japan increased its control over the population. Japan's initial friendliness towards the local people began to fade. Fishermen were restricted to operating within a specific distance from the shore and were prohibited from fishing at night. Villages were reorganized into household units called Tonari Gumi, each led by a Tonari Gumi-Cho. Patrols were conducted day and night to monitor the population. The Japanese also established the Keibodan, auxiliary police units tasked with supervising civilian activities. Members of these units received military training and were equipped with wooden weapons. Above all, the Kenpeitai, the Japanese military police, oversaw all activities. The Kenpeitai was notorious for its thorough surveillance and its harsh methods of enforcement.

Moreover, the financial needs for the war against the Allies increased, while the source of income did not increase. Therefore, the policy of exploiting people's labour for the benefit of Japan began to appear. People were forced to work in factories. Cruel tortures against dissenters by the Kempeitai were seen everywhere. The freedom of the people's leaders was restricted, and organisations and associations were only allowed to carry out service-oriented activities for the benefit of Japan. These harsh acts by the Japanese occupation government led to tensions between the Japanese military authorities based in Bukittinggi and Governor Yano Kenzo who headed the West Coast Sumatra provincial civilian government in Padang.

=== Rōmusha ===
With plantation products no longer being exported internationally and domestic needs already met, the plantation workers' roles changed significantly across West Sumatra. Many former coolie contract workers, abandoned by the Dutch plantation system, sought alternative livelihoods. This marked a turning point as they began working independently, either as daily laborers on local farms or as free laborers in urban areas. However, not all were fortunate enough to escape forced labor. In an effort to meet the need for labour, the Japanese authorities imposed compulsory rōmusha labour on the population for various Japanese purposes, such as building roads, railways (notably the Logas railway), bridges, fortifications, and protection tunnels. Many bomb shelters and protection tunnels, known as Lobang Jepang (Japanese Caves), were built in cities such as Padang and Bukittinggi and are still seen across West Sumatra. A significant number of former plantation workers were forcibly conscripted into the romusha system by the Japanese military. These individuals were often sent abroad or deployed to work on military infrastructure projects for the Japanese forces. In addition to forced labor, civil servants, merchants, school children, and residents who did not participate in rōmusha were subjected to Kinrohoshi (mandatory community service). This "voluntary work" involved tasks such as gathering river stones, sand, and gravel and transporting these materials to designated locations for use in construction projects. The Muaro-Pekanbaru railway line was the result of forced labour involving approximately 6,600 prisoners of war and 30,000 rōmusha workers. The strain on the families of the rōmusha workers, who had to find other means of survival, was profound. Those spared direct abuse by the Japanese military were left with inadequate food, substandard clothing, and poor health due to malnutrition and disease. They faced social stigmatization, losing societal respect and personal dignity. As the Japanese established a system of social stratification in Indonesian society, the system divided the population into three tiers: Japanese nationals, the Pribumi, and individuals of "Eastern foreign" descent. The severe deprivation experienced by these laborers gave rise to a new social class referred to as the kere or gembel (the destitute). This compounded the hardships of a population already burdened by decades of exploitation and neglect.

==== Muarakalaban–Muaro–Pekanbaru railway ====
During the Japanese occupation, thousands of Indonesian rōmusha and allied POWs, were forcibly conscripted to construct the Muaro Sijunjung–Pekanbaru railway, which passed through Logas. The railway had strategic importance, intended to facilitate troop movements and the transport of military equipment as part of Sumatra's defense strategy. Construction was hurried, resulting in infrastructure that was often temporary or semi-permanent. The majority of the rōmusha were brought from Java, serving as forced laborers under severe conditions. Many never returned home after the Japanese surrender—having perished at their work sites or fallen into such poor health that they were unable to travel back. Laborers faced extreme physical demands, inadequate food and medical care, and the threat of disease, particularly malaria. Survivors were often left emaciated, suffering from skin conditions and other illnesses.

To locals, the name "Logas" became synonymous with forced labor and immense suffering. The Japanese military employed various methods to recruit rōmusha, including the sudden roundup of civilians in West Sumatra. In Padang, for instance, people leaving cinemas were herded onto waiting trucks and transported without any prior notice, leaving their families unaware of their fate. These abrupt conscriptions deeply upset the Minangkabau people and led to widespread fear, causing many to avoid leaving their homes. Local leaders in Padang Panjang, including Dr. A. Rahim Usman, Bagindo Azizchan, and Jusuf, sought to address these concerns by forming a committee to oversee the recruitment process. This committee ensured that workers sent to Muaro Sijunjung were provided with food, medicine, and health personnel. Despite these efforts, many workers fled due to the harsh conditions in the forested and swampy areas, due to the strict and often brutal supervision by the Japanese military. The railway ultimately connected West Sumatra and Riau. However, it came at a tremendous human cost. According to Dutch historian Loe de Jong, approximately 5,500 Allied prisoners of war were forced to work on the Pekanbaru railway, of which 700 died, representing a mortality rate of one in eight. Additionally, around 22,000 rōmusha were conscripted for the project, of whom approximately 17,000 perished; equivalent to a mortality rate of four in five.

=== Education ===
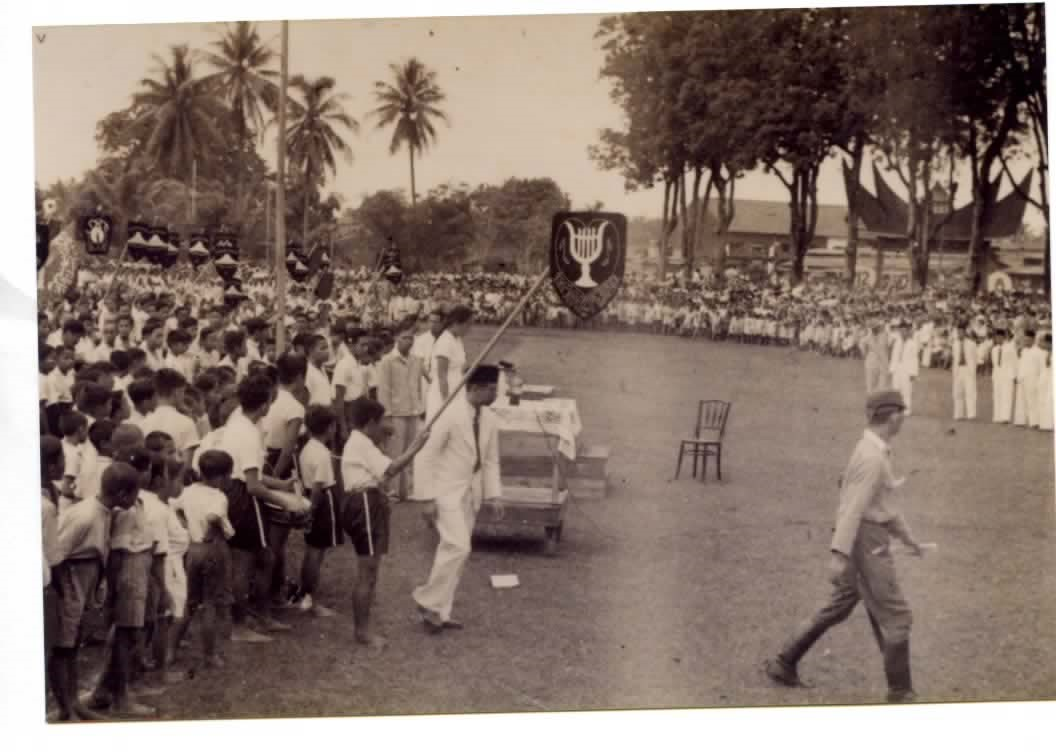
An event attended by the public and school students in the courtyard of the Padang shūchōkan building. Madjid Usman is seen walking in the foreground with Lieutenant Utsumi of the Keibitai (Garnizun) of Padang

During the Japanese occupation, the local education system underwent abrupt closure and subsequent reorganization, followed by a shift in language, routines, and pedagogy. Dutch-medium instruction was discontinued and replaced with Japanese; intensive short courses in Japanese language were organized locally and concluded with formal certificates. All existing government schools thus continued, and teachers who had returned to their villages during the early stages of the Japanese invasion were recalled to resume teaching. These schools were renamed using Japanese terminology. For instance, primary schools were renamed Kotō Kokumin Gakkō, secondary schools became Chū Gakkō, and teacher training schools were renamed Shihan Gakkō. Curricula were adjusted to align with Japanese objectives. Subjects deemed incompatible with Japanese interests were modified or removed. Dutch and English language studies were eliminated from the curriculum. The Dutch Meer Uitgebreid Lager Onderwijs (junior high school; MULO) system was not allowed to operate; its former students were transferred to teacher training schools instead.

In addition to existing schools, the Japanese military government established specialized training institutions to quickly develop cadres for administrative and governmental roles. These included the Sumatera Gunsei Gakkō (Administrative School) and Sumatera Jōkyū Kanri Gakkō (Public Administration School) in Batu Sangkar, schools that recruited students from across Sumatra. Education policy and oversight during the Japanese occupation were entirely controlled by the Gunseikan, specifically through its Education and Teaching Division. This control extended to government, private, and religious schools, ensuring alignment with Japanese wartime priorities. Other new types of institutions were also established, including jogakkō (girls’ junior high schools) and joshi shihan gakkō (female teacher-training colleges) at Padang Panjang. Selection for new secondary institutions placed weight on intelligence testing, general knowledge, interviews, and unusually rigorous physical examinations on bodily fitness and discipline in addition to scholastic aptitude. The schools were staffed by a mixture of Indonesian and Japanese teachers and headed by an Indonesian principal with a Japanese deputy. The Hoofdschoolopziener (chief school inspector) from the Dutch colonial administration was appointed as the deputy head of education at the office of the shūchōkan. This office also included three inspectors: one overseeing Islamic religious schools, one of Chinese descent managing Chinese schools, and another supervising 20 school inspectors assigned to various regions.

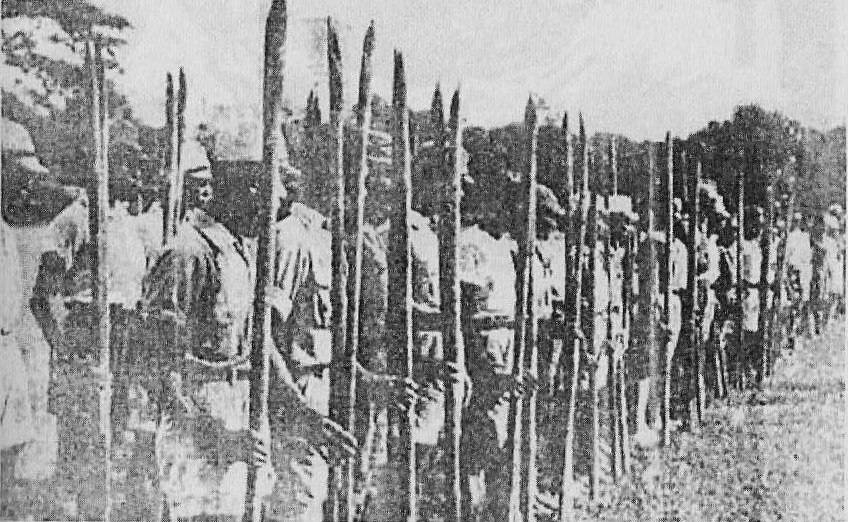
Minangkabau students participating in Seinendan education during the Japanese occupation of West Sumatra

Through education, the Japanese made fundamental changes in West Sumatra. Schools were mobilised for Japanese interests and Japanization policies were implemented. Indonesian was made the language of instruction in schools to introduce Japanese culture and at the same time, students at various levels prioritized Japanese language instruction, usually leading to dissemination of the Japanese language and the inculcation of bushido-style Japanese nationalism. The Japanese authorities gradually attempted to replace the indigenous culture with their own, aligning education with their broader cultural assimilation goals. Students were also trained in taisō (a type of Japanese morning exercise), Japanese-style mutual aid, group collaboration (gotong royong), and even military training. These activities were given more time than academics.

First hand account by Yohanna Jonhs recounts a daily life that followed a quasi-military timetable: reveille at 05:30; a flag-raising ceremony with the singing of "Kimigayo"; facing the rising sun with a memorized recitation of an act of dedication to the Emperor (Tenno Heika) and the deep bow (saikeirei); calisthenics (taisō); formal morning classes; and supervised afternoon study or excursions. Evenings combined formal Indonesian dress, table etiquette retained from pre-war Dutch practice, private study, and strict "lights out" at 22:00. Curricular resources were limited (few books beyond children's newspapers), so formal instruction prioritized Japanese language alongside educational psychology, sewing, music, and dance. The pedagogy stressed seishin (spirit) and kokoro (noble heart), praising effort, persistence, and service to a larger community. Political messaging was present but often embedded in routine: slogans such as "Dai Tōa banzai" (long live Greater East Asia) were encouraged, while morning rites and collective physical training were used to reinforced loyalty, unity, and endurance. Community reactions were mixed, particularly among pious households concerned about religious propriety; school authorities explicitly distinguished imperial obeisance from Muslim prayer postures to address such concerns. A simple daily uniform reduced visible class distinctions among pupils and was also adopted by the Japanese staff, who presented themselves as "older siblings" rather than distant authorities. Classroom discipline shifted away from dutch era public shaming and severe punishments toward encouragement and indirect correction; blanket penalties for minor infractions (such as returning late from monthly leave) were curbed. Extracurricular life prominently featured singing of both Japanese and Indonesian songs, "nature appreciation", and small rituals of politeness (e.g., offering with both hands and a bowing). Education focused on instilling a spirit of loyalty and nationalism aligned with Japanese goals rather than focusing on general academic knowledge.

Due to restrictions on the number of recruits admitted to the Giyūgun, leaders encouraged the establishment of alternative organizations to ensure broader access to military training. This led to the creation of the Zikeidan and the Bogonan, local defense groups tasked with maintaining village and urban security. Additionally, a youth movement named Seinendan was formed as part of the Giyūgun's auxiliary forces. Members of these organizations received military training, typically led by officers from the Giyūgun, along with spiritual and nationalist instruction provided by prominent local figures. The primary training center for Seinendan was located at the INS Kayutanam educational grounds founded by Engku Muhammad Sjafei. And so, youth were trained militarily, from a young age, for the Keibōdan (police auxiliaries), Seinendan (village security guards), Heihō (Greater East Asia soldiers), Rōmusha (Greater East Asia builder soldiers), and the Giyūgun. Meanwhile, the educated classes, especially teachers, civil servants, and students, were made into "new Japanese" or Atarashii Nippon-jin (新しい日本人), mandating the understanding of the Japanese language. Seikeirei (bowing to the emperor's palace in Tokyo) and Mokutō (commemorating the spirits of Japanese heroes) were performed at certain times. These activities were usually done after hearing the speeches of the shūchōkan or Japanese officials. Keirei (standing salute) is mandatory whenever passing Japanese dignitaries, even in cars.

Efforts to promote adult education aimed at advancing societal progress and intelligence were limited for a significant period, with the situation during the Japanese occupation remaining largely unchanged from that during the Dutch colonial era. Community organizations and political parties, including Muhammadiyah, Aisyiyah, Perti, Persatuan Muslim Indonesia (Permi), and the Indonesian Islamic Union Party (PSII), spearheaded initiatives such as literacy schools and remedial education programs. However, these efforts faced subtle pressures from the authorities. Suspicion toward grassroots initiatives often led to restrictions, and meetings organized by these groups were closely monitored, discouraging widespread participation. Moreover, attempts at adult education were hampered by regulations that suppressed unauthorized educational activities, leaving much of the population with limited knowledge and education. Although Japanese authorities nominally allowed adult education initiatives, these efforts were only permitted if they served wartime objectives. In practice, little-to-no attention was given to the broader educational needs of the population. The intense focus on collective labor (gotong-royong) for military purposes further limited opportunities for such programs. As a result, throughout this period, adult education efforts were minimal and inadequate. While community and religious organizations tried to address the issue, they could not meet the widespread demand for education, leaving many uneducated people across various parts of West Sumatra. By the time Japan surrendered in 1945, there were 1,129 schools under this system, serving 156,649 students and employing 2,892 teachers. In addition, there were 1,413 private and religious schools with a combined enrollment of 109,699 students and with 3,971 teachers.

=== Economic turmoil ===
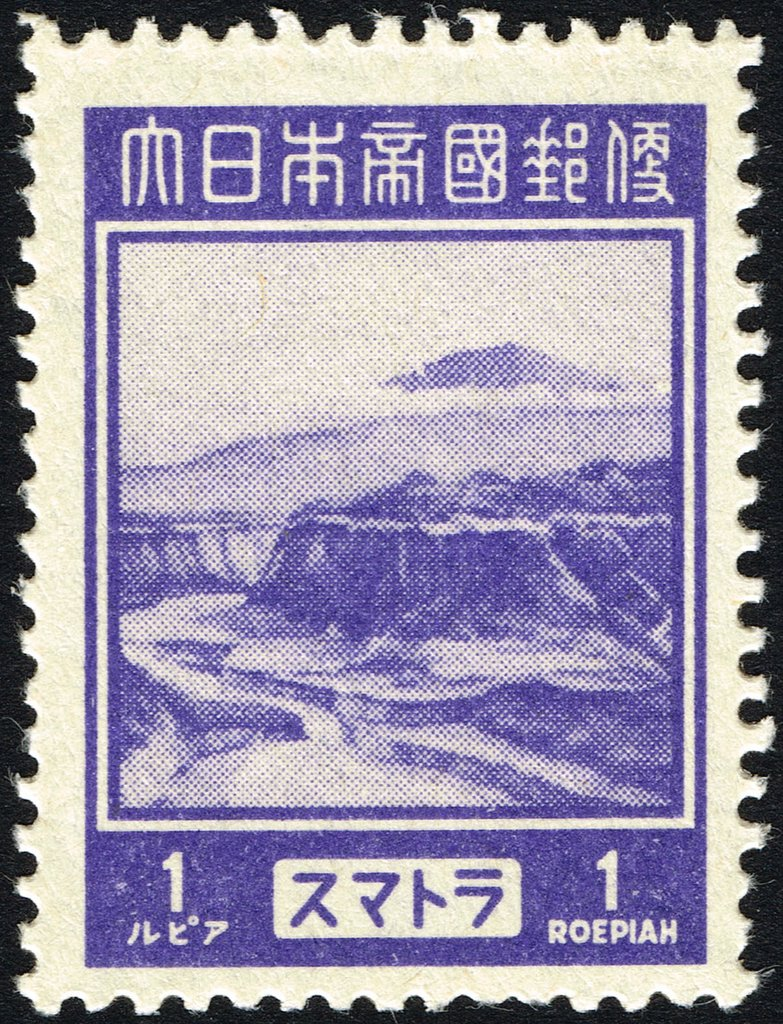
Japanese stamp as issued from 1944 in Sumatra, valued at 1 Roepiah, featuring Sianok Canyon

As Japan's military power began to decline from the first half of 1944, the impact on the local population in occupied territories in Sumatra became increasingly severe. One of the most significant factors exacerbating the situation was the Japanese military authorities' decision to increase the money supply without any backing by real assets. This policy led to severe inflation, drastically reducing the purchasing power of the local population. Takao Fusayama later described the situation as ‘distressing’, noting that imports of goods from Japan which had been cut off by Allied forces, further worsening inflation. Tanabe, a military man, often sought Yano Kenzo's opinion because he himself was "dissatisfied with the military reports and policies issued by the Military Government Headquarters." In addition to "being very interested in policies concerning the indigenous people." Tanabe's overeliance on Yano was so pronounced that the Gunseikanbu (Military Administration) attempted to distance Tanabe away from Yano, but these efforts were ultimately unsuccessful. The potential devastation wrought by this monetary policy caused Governor Yano to strongly protest against its impact on the local people. And so, mounting economic pressure led to Yano Kenzo to resign in protest.

For persisting in his stance against the exploitative nature of the economic policies pursued by the Japanese authorities, Yano Kenzo had to resign as governor in March 1944. Officially leaving in April 1944, he was then replaced by Hattori Naoaki. The new governor, described as a "careful and cautious person", had previously served as the head of education in Sumatra. Yano saw that the Japanese occupying forces were well aware of Indonesia's abundant resources and were determined to maintain their hold on the country, even if it meant giving up the Philippines and Burma.

Anyone can find on the first page of the country's financial books that the prices of goods will rise in line with the increased supply of war currency. A doubling of the amount of money has caused the price of goods to triple.

— Yano Kenzo

Despite Yano's protests, economic pressures continued to mount as Japan's military setbacks worsened in the following months. Induced from the worsening situation, the Japanese military government intensified its demands on the Sumatran people, requiring local officials to supply foodstuffs and other materials at increasingly higher fixed rations. Additionally, they were tasked with finding men to work as "coolies" on Japanese defense construction projects. The Japanese framed their campaign as Dai Tōa Sensō (The Greater East Asia War), which was described as a "total war of the Indonesian people to liberate Asia from the control of foreign powers." The ruling Japanese demanded total dedication of resources and efforts to this cause, emphasizing loyalty and service over political aspirations. Ordering the local populace to cooperate and to harshly slap or punish laborers who were deemed lazy. Organizations and movements permitted under Japanese rule were required to align with the goal of "victory in the war". Consequently, all efforts were channeled toward labor and production. At this stage of the war, Japanese authorities hastily redirected their efforts toward constructing defensive positions and fortresses.

Obtaining household necessities became harder due to the war effort's demands. All staple foods were prioritized for the Japanese forces engaged in the Pacific war, forcing most of the people's agricultural products to be surrendered for war purposes. Most of the West Sumatran economy was concentrated on food cultivation. The intensity of food production was far greater than during the Dutch era, with much of the population becoming impoverished. Many then relied on various leaves and tubers for sustenance. The Japanese military requisitioned much of the available rice harvest for their own supplies, leaving the local population with minimal access to staple foods. Animal meat and fish became scarce, as they were largely confiscated by Japanese forces to sustain their troops. Granulated sugar became a rare commodity as it had to be imported from Java, and the locals had to resort to using Lawang sugar, a type of local red sugarcane that would be ground into a powder. Salt was also scarce, with the salt briquettes made in Madura becoming hard to find, leading people to make their own salt. Basic hygiene products were difficult to obtain, and many people had to use substitutes such as rice straw ash or kenikir fruit for soap. Kerosene, essential for lighting, was in very short supply, prompting the widespread use of coconut oil lamps or burning rubber as an alternative. Matches were also hard to come by, so people resorted to using fire hatches, striking a hard stone with iron to create sparks and light fires.

In schools, food scarcity shaped diets of students as they eat; sweet potatoes for breakfast and simple vegetable stews. Students participated in subsistence tasks such as digging school grounds for tubers and foraging with sacks for edible plants on organized expeditions. Excursions also doubled as language immersion and morale-building exercises, with teachers encouraging group singing, scheduled rests, and informal conversation to build rapport. Certain materials such like bamboo shoots were prohibited for harvest as it was prioritied for wartime construction resources.

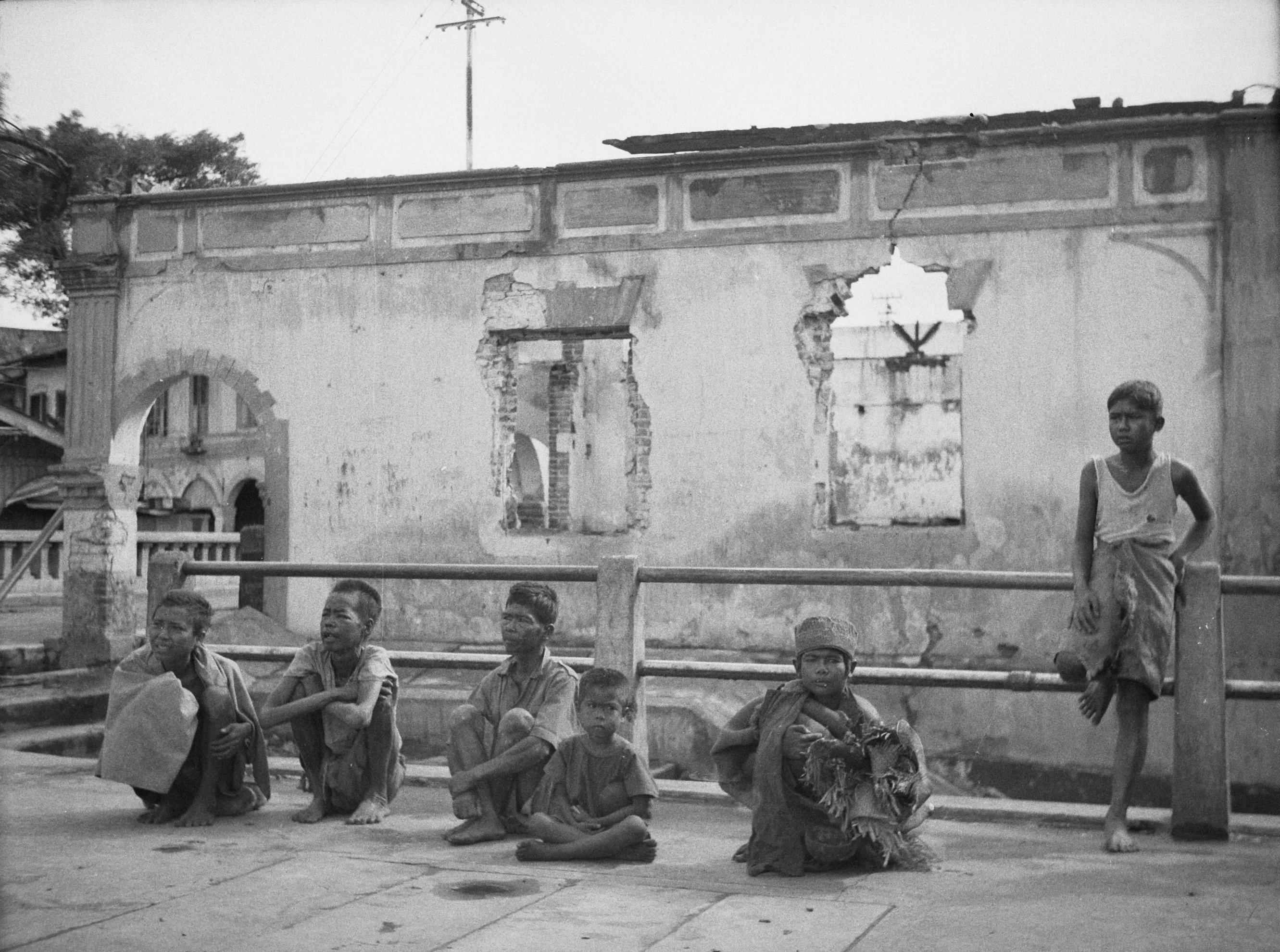
Group of children from Bukittinggi, like much of the town's population, were found severely malnourished and poorly dressed (1948)

The shortage of clothing was particularly acute, especially in the later years of the war. Urban dwellers, who typically had more old clothes, could cope somewhat, but villagers, especially farmers who could only afford to make or buy new clothes once a year, suffered greatly. Many villagers were too ashamed to go out, and if they had to, they wore makeshift body coverings made of tarok bark or burlap. The price of cloth skyrocketed, with just a few pieces of batik cloth being valuable enough to exchange for a paddy field. Although there was some cloth, much of it was stored in Japanese warehouses for war use, exacerbating the shortages.

Transportation was another significant issue. Bicycles were often used with dead tires, and cars or buses no longer used petrol but instead relied on oil made from rubber, which emitted a foul smell. The difficulties in transportation also affected trade between regions. Moving goods was challenging due to the lack of transport equipment and the damaged infrastructure, including railways. Trade required special licenses, particularly for goods transported to Java. The condition of the railway tracks was so poor that it led to two significant accidents in West Sumatra during the war: one at Pakan Raba'a near Padang Panjang in 1944 and another in Lembah Anai. The accident in Lembah Anai was so destructive that investigators from the Mantetsu Company joined the rescue efforts to help recover the bodies of the crash victims.

== Plans for Sumatra ==
In the early months of the Japanese occupation, the repressive nature of the administration in Sumatra likely stemmed from initial plans to integrate Malaya and Sumatra directly into the Japanese Empire. These territories were seen as pivotal, with Sumatra in particular regarded as "the center of industrial development in the Southern area" and part of "the nuclear zone of the Empire's plans for the Southern area." As such, they were subjected to strict control, with efforts to foster a close relationship of mutual interdependence between the two territories and measures aimed at their full integration into the Japanese imperial structure. A Japanese policy statement issued in April 1942 declared that Malaya and Sumatra would ultimately be incorporated into Japan's territory. The Japanese occupation of Sumatra provided a distinct strategic perspective compared to Java. Sumatra was administratively combined with Malaya under the authority of the 25th Army rather than being placed with Java under the 16th Army. One key reason for this arrangement was Japan's objective to prevent the "Indonesia" from being recognized as a single political entity. While initially driven by strategic considerations, as well as economic value from resources such as oil, rubber, and tin, this belief was later reinforced by political demands requiring Japan to reject the use of the term and concept of Indonesia. In the later years of the occupation, the reluctance to grant any real power to Sumatrans was further reinforced by Japanese fears that the Allies might use Sumatra as the spearhead for a counter-offensive against Japan. From a strategic viewpoint, the primary threat of invasion in Southeast Asia came from the west, via the Straits of Malacca. Thus the strategic importance of the strait justified merging Sumatra with Malaya administratively, rather than aligning it with Java. While Sumatra lacked rice production and export-oriented industries, its oil resources were critical for sustaining Japan's military and industrial operations. In contrast, Java's surplus rice production and large labor force were utilized to support Japanese campaigns in Central Asia. These considerations were the Japanese rationale for managing Sumatra and Java as separate administrative entities. Additionally, Java's larger population and stronger nationalist movements necessitated greater emphasis on political warfare; contrasted with Sumatra, which received less political engagement.

The demand for independence was not nearly so strong as in Java. The opinion of the Japanese Army officials in Sumatra was that the people of that country were not sufficiently developed, socially and culturally, to take on themselves the responsibilities of self-government. They therefore approached the task in a "half-hearted manner".

— General Shimura on the political consciousness of the Sumatrans'

After April 1943, when Sumatra was administratively separated from Malaya, there was some reconsideration of Japanese policy in light of the worsening war situation. However, the 25th Army, which now only held sole authority over Sumatra, remained steadfastly opposed to making any significant concessions toward independence. Any limited steps taken in this direction were done reluctantly and only under pressure from Tokyo or their counterparts in Java, who faced greater challenges and had adopted a more pragmatic approach to engaging with Indonesian nationalist aspirations. Consequently, until 1945, there was little indication of any plans for eventual independence, and the Japanese actively suppressed nationalist movements on the island. General Tanabe attested that prior to Japan's surrender, the idea of an independence movement was not seriously considered, nor did the Japanese military government provide support for such efforts. From his accounts, it remained unclear what form this independence might take; it was likely to differ from Manchukuo, which did not have the equivalent of a Volksraad (People's Council). Tanabe himself stated that he had little interest or expertise in political matters.

=== After 1944 ===
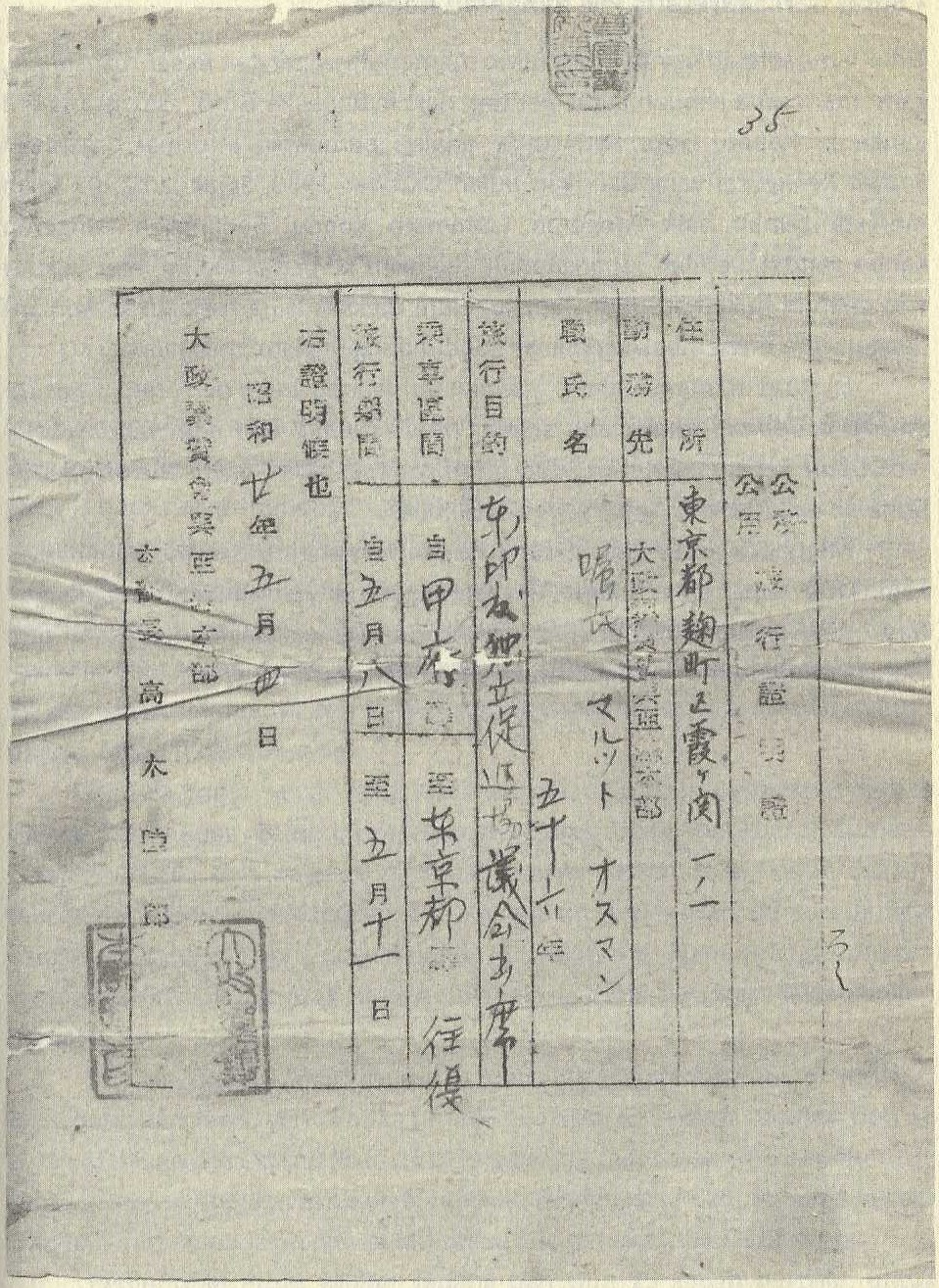
Letter from the Taisei-Yokusankai, inviting Madjid to Tokyo (4 May 1945)

After the fall of the Tōjō Cabinet, Madjid Usman, who was in Kōfu under house arrest at the time, was invited by members of the Taisei-Yokusankai (Imperial Rule Assistance Association) to Tokyo, including prominent journalists such as Akira Asano, Rintaro Takeda, Uio Tomisawa, and other notable Japanese figures. On 8 May 1945, they offered Madjid the position of leading an "Interim Indonesian Government" centered in Sumatra given his pro-Japanese background and as an alternative to Sukarno. This proposal was framed in the context of the Koiso Promise made by then-Prime Minister Kuniaki Koiso, which hinted at granting independence to Indonesia. However, Madjid refused the offer, viewing it as a move to turn Indonesia into a pro-Japanese puppet state and a belligerent in the war. To Madjid, this arrangement was no different from Ba Maw's Burma or Puyi's Manchukuo, both of which were nominally independent but effectively under Japanese control. In conjunction, when Prime Minister Kuniaki Koiso promised independence for Indonesia, including all of the former Dutch East Indies, as part of the Koiso Declaration of 7 September 1944, the 25th Army Command in Bukittinggi strongly opposed the inclusion of Sumatra within the promised Indonesian territory.

The 25th Army tried to hold on to the territory until the end of the Japanese occupation. During the final four months of the Japanese occupation, the leadership of the 25th Army began making efforts to develop a pan-Sumatran leadership. These efforts were primarily aimed at resisting Tokyo's push towards Indonesian independence. On 24 March 1945, it was announced that a Sumatra-wide Chūō Sangiin (Central Advisory Council) would be established—nearly two years after the creation of a similar council in Java, stemming from the same reluctance in allowing Indonesians in the administrative function. It was intended to mirror that of the 16th Army's Chūō Sangiin in Java, chaired by Sukarno. The Sumatran Chūō Sangiin held its first and only session in May 1945. In late May, the Gunseikanbu (Military Administration) in Bukittinggi announced the appointment of leaders for the council. The chairman was Mohammad Sjafei, a Minangkabau educational reformer and prominent political figure in West Sumatra under Japanese rule. The council's secretary, also from the Minangkabau region, was Djamaluddin Adinegoro, regarded as one of Indonesia's most distinguished journalists. Adinegoro was relocated from Medan to Bukittinggi to assume his duties. The two vice-chairmen were Teuku Njak Arif, representing Aceh, and Abdul Abbas, representing Lampung, both of whom chaired representative councils in their respective regions. By June and July, these leaders were promoted in the Japanese-controlled press as the empat serangkai (four-in-one) of Sumatra, drawing comparisons to the more renowned empat serangkai leadership in Java (Sukarno, Mohammad Hatta, Ki Hajar Dewantoro, and Kyai H. Mas Mansur.) The single meeting of the Sumatra Central Advisory Council, held over five days and concluding on 2 July 1945, was historically significant as the first conference to represent all major social and political forces in Sumatra. The council made several demands, including the rapid development of popular, military, and educational institutions at the Sumatran level. It also played a key role in legitimizing a unified Sumatran leadership for the first time. Prominent figures such as Adnan Kapau Gani, a Minangkabau politician based in Palembang, and Ferdinand Lumbantobing, a leader from the Toba Batak community, were central to this leadership, alongside the empat serangkai (four central figures). The meeting's atmosphere generally supported a stronger and more autonomous Sumatra. However, it opposed the 25th Army's efforts to separate the island from the unified and independent Indonesia that had been decided upon by Tokyo.

The council's potential role in shaping Sumatra's future was effectively curtailed, not only by the restrictions imposed by the 25th Army Command but also by the region's historical developments in preceding years. A significant factor contributing to the futility of Sumatra's self-determination plan, nudged by the 25th Army since the beginning of the Japanese occupation, was the minimal contact between provinces (Shū). According to historian Audrey Kahin, it was only at the shū level that indigenous organizations began to emerge. The 25th Army remained steadfast in its policy of dismantling all organized activity. Communications and the ability to organize between residencies were also curtailed, as all Japanese-sponsored organizations in Sumatra were strictly confined to the residency level, limiting their scope and influence. Additionally, prewar nonpolitical organizations such as Muhammadiyah and Taman Siswa found it nearly impossible to establish contact or coordinate activities beyond this level. This policy continued until the last six months of the occupation. Following Tokyo's demand, the 25th Army reluctantly conceded to allowing the Indonesian national flag to be flown, the national song to be sung, and any Indonesian-esque symbols only to be used by the people of Sumatra, although permitted for propaganda purposes. Previously, both such acts had been banned since Sukarno's time in Sumatra. Despite these concessions, the 25th Army continued to insist that Sumatra should follow a separate path from Java.

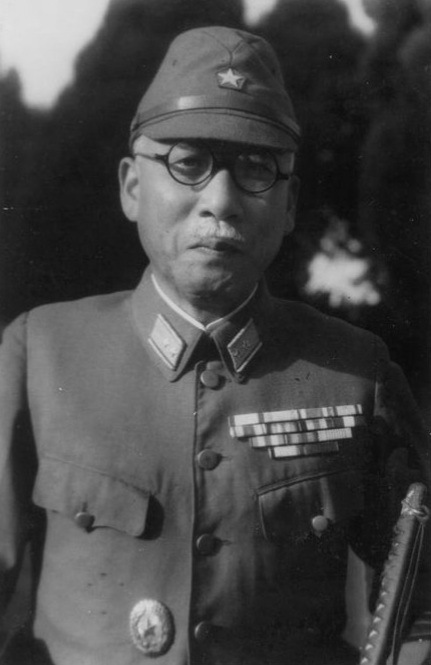
Lieutenant General Moritake Tanabe, of the 25th Army

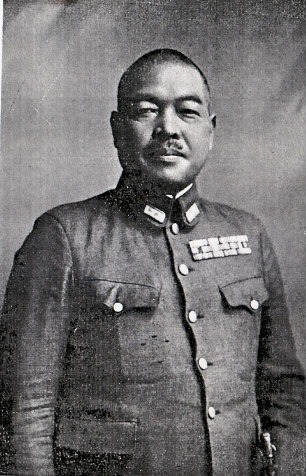
Lieutenant General Harada Kumkichi, of the 16th Army

Rivalry between the 25th and 16th Army hampered Indonesian independence

On 25 July 1945, the Japanese 25th Army begrudgingly allowed the establishment of a rivaling BPUPK (Investigating Committee for Preparatory Work) in Sumatra, chaired by Mohammad Sjafei, who also served as the head of the Sumatra Central Advisory Council. The BPUPK in Sumatra was a copy of the 16th Army's BPUPK in Java. The 25th Army previously rejected calls from the 16th Army to send delegates for the establishment of the BPUPK in Java. Despite the 16th Army's original intention for the BPUPK to include "influential residents of Java and Sumatra", the 25th Army chose not to announce any Sumatra-based delegations. Similarly, General Shimura repeatedly denied Sukarno permission to visit Sumatra ever again, fearing that such a visit could embolden the independence movement in Sumatra and "lead it to deviate from the carefully controlled path prescribed by Japanese authorities." At the end of the war, significant distrust emerged between the 25th Army in Bukittinggi and both the 7th Area Army and the 16th Army to the point of inter-army sabotage, notably on the creation selected members of the BPUPK in Djakarta. An instance involved the selection of delegates, which had been decided in Syonan or Djakarta without reference to the 25th Army. Mohammad Amir noted that Yamaguchi, the head of political affairs in Sumatra, expressed dissatisfaction that the move was without consultation with the 25th Army. Japanese planners in Syonan and Djakarta harbored reservations about the leadership made by the uncompromising 25th Army, viewing it as "overly distinctively Sumatran" in identity or "too closely tied to the Gunseikan (military government authorities)" in administration.

An example of the Japanese 25th Army's intervention in Indonesian political developments was its obstruction of Mohammad Sjafei's departure to attend the Preparatory Committee for Indonesian Independence (PPKI) conference in Djakarta. Instead, the 25th Army appointed three delegates from Sumatra: Abdul Abbas, Mohammad Amir, and Teuku Mohammad Hasan. This decision diverged from the 16th Army's plans for Indonesian independence and has been viewed as a deliberate effort to assert Sumatra's distinct political priorities by the 25th Army. The selection of these delegates was dubious, as they were relatively less prominent compared to figures such as Mohammad Sjafei, Adinegoro, and Abdul Malik Gani, who were more closely associated with nationalist leaders in Java. To academic Anthony Reid, it can be argued that the appointed delegates were chosen because they were perceived as less committed to a unified Sumatra or more aligned with the 25th Army's objectives. However, another interpretation suggests that Abdul Abbas, Mohammad Amir, and Teuku Mohammad Hasan were stronger advocates for Sumatran autonomy and less connected to Java-based nationalist movements than their counterparts. During the first session of the Panitia Persiapan Kemerdekaan Indonesia (PPKI), Mohammad Amir advocated for significant autonomy for Sumatra. This was met with strong objections from Mohammad Hatta, who was born and raised in West Sumatra. Hatta instead had advocated for the division of Sumatra into three provinces, as were several other members on the committee. Teuku Mohammad Hasan was the strongest proponent of a single Sumatran province, and he was also opposed to the idea of sub-provinces. Though his reasoning is not very clear. Despite strong objections from Hatta, the committee ultimately decided that Sumatra would be constituted as a single province with Medan as its capital and Teuku Mohammad Hasan as its governor.

For the 25th army's BPUPK, the secretary of the committee was Djamaluddin Adinegoro. In addition to the chairman and secretary, the committee comprised 22 members, including prominent figures such as A.K. Gani, Teuku Hasan, Hamka, and the Sultan of Asahan. Although the committee never convened formally, it issued a statement expressing its resolve to support the Japanese Empire. The chairman and secretary had planned a tour around Sumatra to deliver speeches promoting this agenda. They began their journey on 26 July, but their efforts were abruptly halted by Japan's surrender, bringing an end to the initiative.

==== Plans to relocate the Emperor ====
There were plans during the latter stages of World War II that the Imperial General Headquarters would relocate to Sumatra if Tokyo were to come under attack by allied forces. This idea came from multiple reports in 1945 when Tokyo was heavily bombed by allied forces on 9‒10 March. Reports indicated a detailed emergency plan devised by General Akira Muto to secure the Emperor's family by relocating them to Sumatra. Muto is said to have approached Satō Morio to conduct a review and provide recommendations for a suitable location in Sumatra as potential refuges for the Emperor and his family. Additionally, some high-ranking members of the Imperial Japanese Army privately contemplated retiring to Sumatra after the war's conclusion. According to Siti Aminah Usman, this rumor is said to have been supported by the visits by Marquis Yoshichika Tokugawa to West Sumatra. Once working with the Japanese occupation government, Siti was once assigned to escort the Marquis on his travels across West Sumatra in 1943. His first visit included stops at Nagari Gurun, Pagaruyung, and Batusangkar, before he eventually stayed in Bukittinggi. On his second visit, he traveled to Diniyyah Putri College in Padang Panjang, where he was warmly received by Rahmah El-Yunusiyah. The leadership of the occupation government refrained from questioning the Marquis's intentions regarding his visits to what seemed to be random treks and visits to small villages (kampongs) and remote areas across Sumatra. However, it was widely suspected that his mission involved surveying locations that could potentially serve as a suitable refuge for the Imperial family, should such a need arise.

== Surrender ==
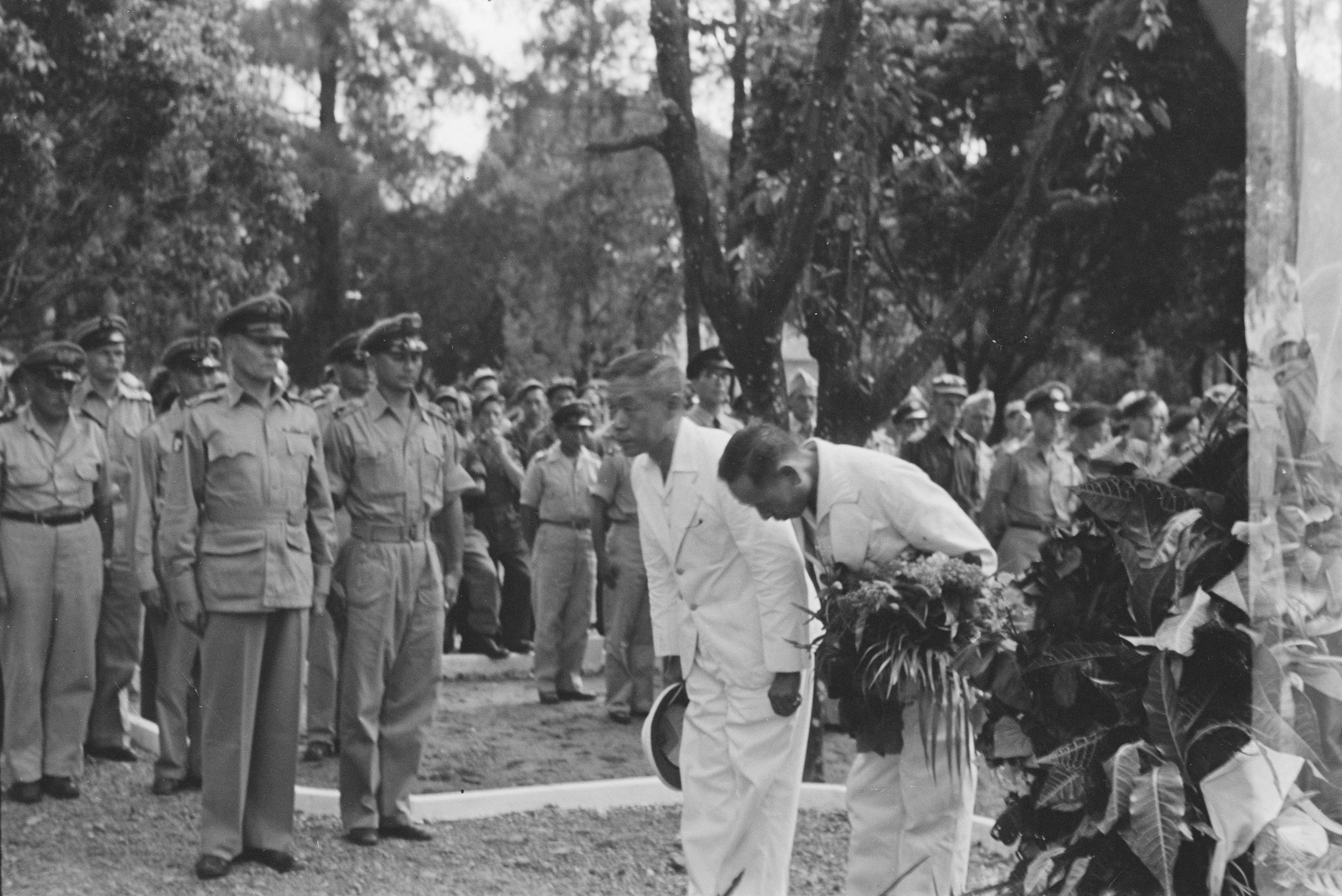
Two Japanese administrators performing saikeirei for the fallen in Padang, 1 May 1947.

On August 15, 1945, many people in West Sumatra were unaware of Japan's surrender. However, those who were observant noticed a change in the demeanor and behavior of the Japanese. The typically rigid and determined Japanese soldiers appeared melancholic and withdrawn. The Sumatra Radio Transmitter (Sumatera Hosokyoku) in Bukittinggi suddenly fell silent, remaining off the air for several days. Across Sumatra's major towns, public radios were also quiet, and a sense of extraordinary unease was visible among the Japanese military and civilians in Bukittinggi. Many Japanese personnel began liquidating their possessions with some dismissing workers.

In the Giyūgun units, the atmosphere had also changed. Weapons had been collected on August 10 in Padang, under the pretext of exchanging them for new ones, coinciding with a break in training due to fasting, but were never returned or replaced. The units were later disbanded irregularly on August 16, 1945, and in some units even later, without any formal ceremony or explanation. Members of the Giyūgun were simply told that the war was over, but there was no declaration of defeat or surrender, leaving many confused and uncertain about the situation. The disarming of the Giyūgun occurred in units stationed in and around Bukittinggi, including locations such as Gulai Bancah, Belakang Blok, Pabidikan, and Sarik, as well as in cities such as Padang and Painan. The Giyūgun members were then sent back to their villages, traveling on foot or by carriage in worn and tattered clothing, some only bringing their uniforms. There is an account by Abdul Halim (Aleng), a 2nd Lieutenant of the Bukittinggi Giyūgun and former teacher of the HIS Muhammadiyah, who was once summoned to the company office in Bukittinggi on August 15. Upon requesting permission to return to his village to see his seriously ill grandmother in Matur, his company commander, 1st Lieutenant Okura, surprisingly granted him leave and even allowed him to stay in the village for an extended period. Halim then shared this unexpected gesture with his colleagues in Bukittinggi, which puzzled many Giyūgun members who had not yet grasped the reason behind the sudden change in their commanders' attitudes. One of the first Indonesians to have heard of the surrender was Jahja Djalil, a prominent activist, courier, and reporter in the region. He was informed by Kurihara, a Japanese journalist working for Kita Sumatora Shimbun in Padang, that the war had ended. The attitude of the Japanese in the region shifted noticeably. They began to approach Indonesians more amiably, but this change was met with skepticism due to the previous harshness and brutality of the Japanese. During a regular meeting at the Japanese Governor's home, Sutan Mohammad Rasjid and other officials from the High Prosecutor's Office, including Liem Gim Tjiang, Idroes and Ismail Karim, were informed by the governor, Hattori Naoaki, that Japan had laid down its arms and was seeking peace. In Muko-Muko, Northern Bengkulu, Dahlan Ibrahim, the deputy commander of the local Giyūgun company, received news of the war's end on 20 August 1945. Following the conclusion of the war and the PPKI conferences in Jakarta, both Mohammad Amir and Teuku Mohammad Hasan met with outgoing Japanese Bukittingi officials in a friendly manner, the Japanese openly stating that all government functions would be transferred to the Indonesians.

The abrupt changes following Japan's surrender created widespread uncertainty among the population. Even the educated local elite found themselves disoriented during this transitional period (Overgangstijdperk), while much of the general population remained politically uninformed after three and a half years of deliberate suppression under Japanese rule and muddled by Japanese propaganda. Radio broadcasts emerged as a vital tool to alleviate societal confusion. However, the Bukittinggi radio transmitters, still under Japanese control, ceased all broadcasts. Only a few residents who secretly unsealed their radios could access foreign broadcasts, which revealed Japan's true defeat—contrary to the Japanese propaganda of a peaceful transition. Inspired by revolutionary fervor, youth activists and former radio staff, including Adnan Burhani, N. Dt. Mangkuto Ameh, Kasuma, Sjahbuddin Mz, Arsul, and Basjari Latif, planned to seize the Bukittinggi radio studio and transmitters at Parik Natuang. They initially intended to raise the Indonesian flag (Sang Merah Putih) atop the transmitter antenna as a symbolic act. However, their plan was halted by the presence of heavily armed Japanese troops guarding the site. It was not until 21 August 1945 that the Sumatra Radio Transmitter resumed broadcasting with a brief announcement in Indonesian, declaring:

"His Majesty the Emperor [Tenno Heika] has ordered the cessation of the war, and the former Japanese cabinet has been dissolved. A new cabinet has been formed under Prince Higashikuni Naruhiko..."

On 22 August 1945, at 10:00 AM, all Giyūgun troops and companies in Bukittinggi and the surrounding areas were officially disbanded. The Giyūgun Koenbu was also disbanded after members notice its operations were without any signs of Japanese supervision or oversight.

=== Proclamation of Independence ===
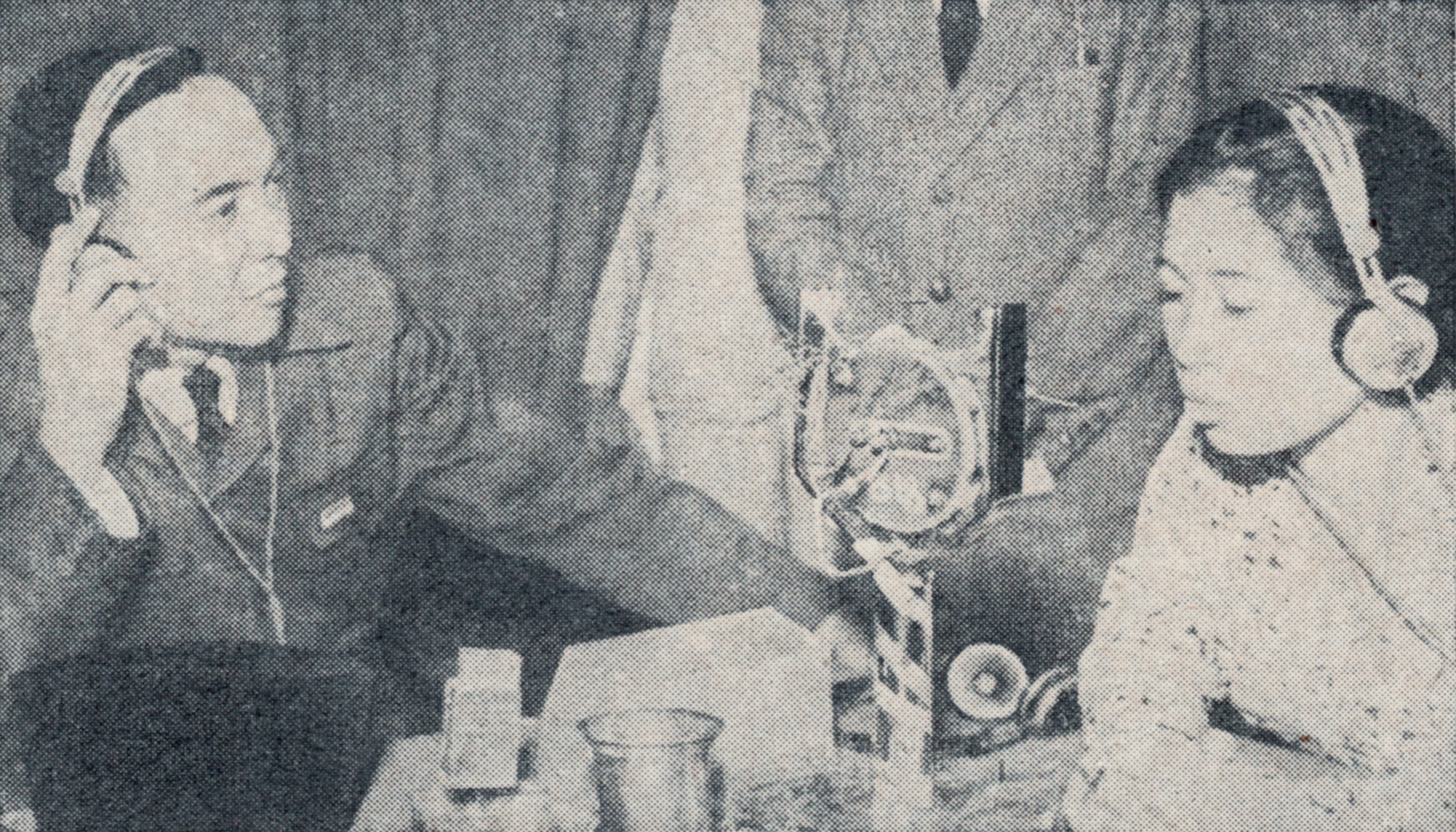
Sukarno and Fatmawati in Yogyakarta making radio contact with Bukittinggi (1945)

News of Indonesia's Proclamation of Independence reached Sumatra earlier than reports of Japan's surrender. While the Japanese surrender was not reported in Medan until 22 August 1945, information about the proclamation had already reached Padang and Bukittinggi by at least 18 August. The first news of the proclamation came from Indonesian employees working at the Post, Telegraaf, en Telefoondienst (PTT) offices in Padang and Bukittinggi. According to Jahja Djalil, the first person in West Sumatra to hear of the proclamation was his brother-in-law, Aladin, an employee of PTT Padang. Early on the morning of 18 August, Aladin received the news and wrote the proclamation on telegram paper, which he passed to Jahja Djalil and Arifin Aliep. The two then traveled to Bukittinggi, where they approached a letterzetter (typesetter) at the inactive office of the Padang Nippo. In secrecy, they managed to print 20 copies of the proclamation, ensuring its dissemination in the region. As soon as the traders and educated classes of West Sumatra received news from Aladin that Sukarno and Hatta had proclaimed Indonesia's independence on 17 August 1945 in Djakarta, word began to spread rapidly by word of mouth. Immediately after word spread, Jahja Djalil and his colleagues went to see Abdullah Halim. Abdullah was of the opinion that the news of the proclamation should be disseminated immediately and that the views of some of the scholars in Padang should be examined. Many of those contacted were cautious of it being possibly false information, but Sutan Mohammad Rasjid and Athos Ausri gave strong encouragement of its being true.

On 21 August 1945, a meeting was held at the Majelis Islam Tinggi (MIT), after a young activist, Nusyirwan Aminuddin Yunus, informed an MIT colleague that he had heard about the declaration of independence through contacts working within the Japanese administration. About 15 young activists, some from Padang, attended. Most were experienced political cadres, while others were new to the movement. The consensus of the meeting was that action was needed, as it was believed that national leaders were uncertain about the next steps in the region. Although at that time there was no direct contact with the leaders in Djakarta to provide clarity, the Indonesian youths (Pemuda, or youth activists) felt responsible for spreading the supposed news of the Proclamation of Indonesian Independence.

The following day, on 22 August 1945, one of the first youth organization was formed in Bukittinggi, with Nusyirwan Aminuddin Yunus appointed as chairman and Mara Karma, a local youth activist, elected as vice-chairman. This local initiative soon expanded into the formation of Pemuda Republik Indonesia Sumatra (PRI Sumatra), a broader youth movement that sought to unite activists across the island. Communications and announcements were sent as far as Aceh, solidifying Bukittinggi's role as both the administrative center of the Japanese occupation and a focal point of the early Indonesian nationalist movement in Sumatra. Leadership of the city's youth efforts was later entrusted entirely to Mara Karma as the local struggle gained momentum. In Sumatra, Japanese efforts to engage youth in the war effort were notably less extensive than in Java. Despite this, a well defined group of pemuda elite emerged. This group comprised individuals who had attained some level of prewar secondary education but were not yet part of the prewar establishment. The Japanese authorities provided these youths with specialized training to prepare them for leadership roles. The most prominent members of this elite received officer training in various Japanese-organized units, such as the Giyūgun, Heihō (auxiliary troops), Tokubetsu Keisatsutai (special police reserves for guarding coastal areas and bridges), and Tokubetsu Hikōjō Kinmutai (special police reserves for airfield security), among others.

The first major action carried out by youth activists in Bukittinggi following the Proclamation of Indonesian Independence was the mass mobilization of residents to raise the red-and-white flag at their homes. Due to the simultaneous and coordinated nature of the flag-raising across the city, the Japanese authorities were unable to respond effectively. The effort was carried out in an orderly manner, and was accompanied by symbolic gestures such as graffiti and slogans on city walls. Communication with Java, especially Bandung, began to flow through youth workers at the PTT (Post, Telegraaf, en Telefoondienst office), enabling Bukittinggi's activists to stay informed about developments in the nationalist movement. The Kempeitai (Japanese military police) maintained a cautious and ambivalent stance toward the growing activities of the Pemuda in Bukittinggi during the early post-proclamation period. The Japanese sought to understand the motivations and structure behind the youth movement. Specifically, whether there was an organized master plan for the actions being taken. Thus the youth leader, Mara Karma, was summoned to Kempeitai headquarters, out of curiosity rather than to be interrogated. Mara Karma later explained that there was no formal plan; that the actions of the pemuda were spontaneous and driven by shared conviction.

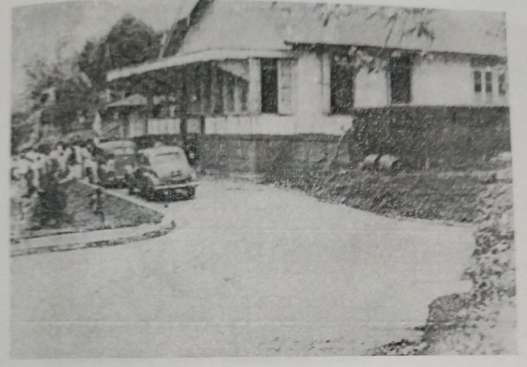
People waiting in front of the Shiyakusho Building (now the National Building) as Republicans negotiate with the Japanese for the handover of authority during the Proclamation of Independence

Understanding the weakness and uncertainty of the Kempeitai, the Mara Karma and the Pemuda groups proceeded to seize control of government buildings, vehicles, ammunition, and other resources. Some of these takeovers were achieved through negotiation, others by force or deception, as the Japanese administration had by then become largely inactive. Even the local police began requesting assistance from the youth, indicating a power shift in local governance. The youth effectively took control of Bukittinggi and surrounding areas, including Agam Tua, and initiated efforts to spread news of the proclamation to other towns and cities. The popular response was overwhelmingly positive, though occasional skirmishes broke out due to impatience among activists eager to assert full control. By then, Indonesian youths began printing pamphlets in secrecy and began to widely distribute them in Padang and several other cities in West Sumatra, and thus the Proclamation of Indonesian Independence became widely known to the public in a relatively short time. In Durian Gadang, reports stated that after the romushas (majority Javanese) learned of Japan's defeat and Indonesia's independence, many celebrated with great enthusiasm. Some performed acts of thanksgiving, such as sujud syukur (prostration in gratitude), while others fulfilled vows by sacrificing goats and buffalo for Kenduri (communal feasts). Though without the ability to go back to Java, most of the romushas in the vicinity of Durian Gadang had to assimilate to Minangkabau culture.

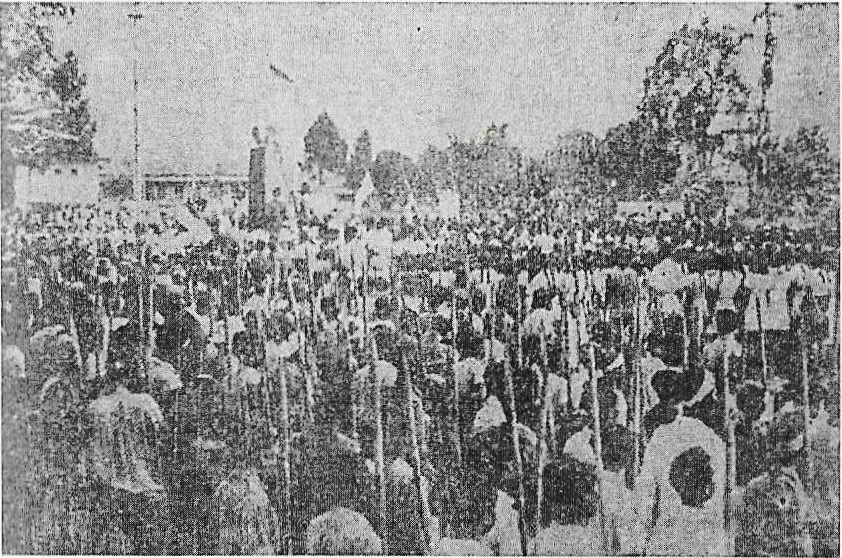
The atmosphere during greeting of the news on the Proclamation of the Republic of Indonesia in Padang

With regard to the Proclamation of Independence, Jahja Djalil sought clarification from Yano Kenzo on the same day. The former Japanese governor confirmed the existence of the Proclamation of Independence but emphasized that it was now a matter for the Indonesian people, not Japan. When asked for his opinion on leadership in the newly independent West Sumatra, Yano expressed his support for Indonesian independence but noted that Japan had changed—now operating under the authority of the Allied powers. If questioned about the proclamation by the Allies, Yano assured Jahja that he would turn a blind eye and feign ignorance regarding the matter, effectively allowing the Indonesian efforts to proceed without interference. Yano then recommended Mohammad Sjafei for the position of Resident, citing Sjafei's roles as chairman of the Chūō Sangiin of Sumatra and chairman of the Shū Sangi-kai of West Sumatra. Yano expressed that he did not see anyone else more suitable for the role. He ordered that his opinion be conveyed to Moehammad Sjafei himself as his final order. Initially, Moehammad Sjafei was hesitant to accept the responsibility of leadership in West Sumatra and required persuasion from figures such as Ismael Lengah, Jahja Djalil, Arifin Aliep, Kaharani Sini, Abdul Aziz, Sulaiman, B.M. Tahar, Djalaloeddin Hasan, Ustad Roesdi, and Sjarif Said. Despite their efforts, Sjafei continued to refuse. Jahja Djalil then relayed this information to Yano Kenzo, who responded with laughter, revealing that he had already spoken directly with. Following this conversation and reassurances by friends, Sjafei would eventually agree to take up the position. In a separate conversation, Jahja Djalil inquired from Yano Kenzo about the possibility of Yano resuming the governorship in an independent Indonesia. Yano dismissed the idea, explaining that a new residency had already been established and that he would not be returning to office in the foreseeable future.

=== Japanese surrender in Sumatra ===
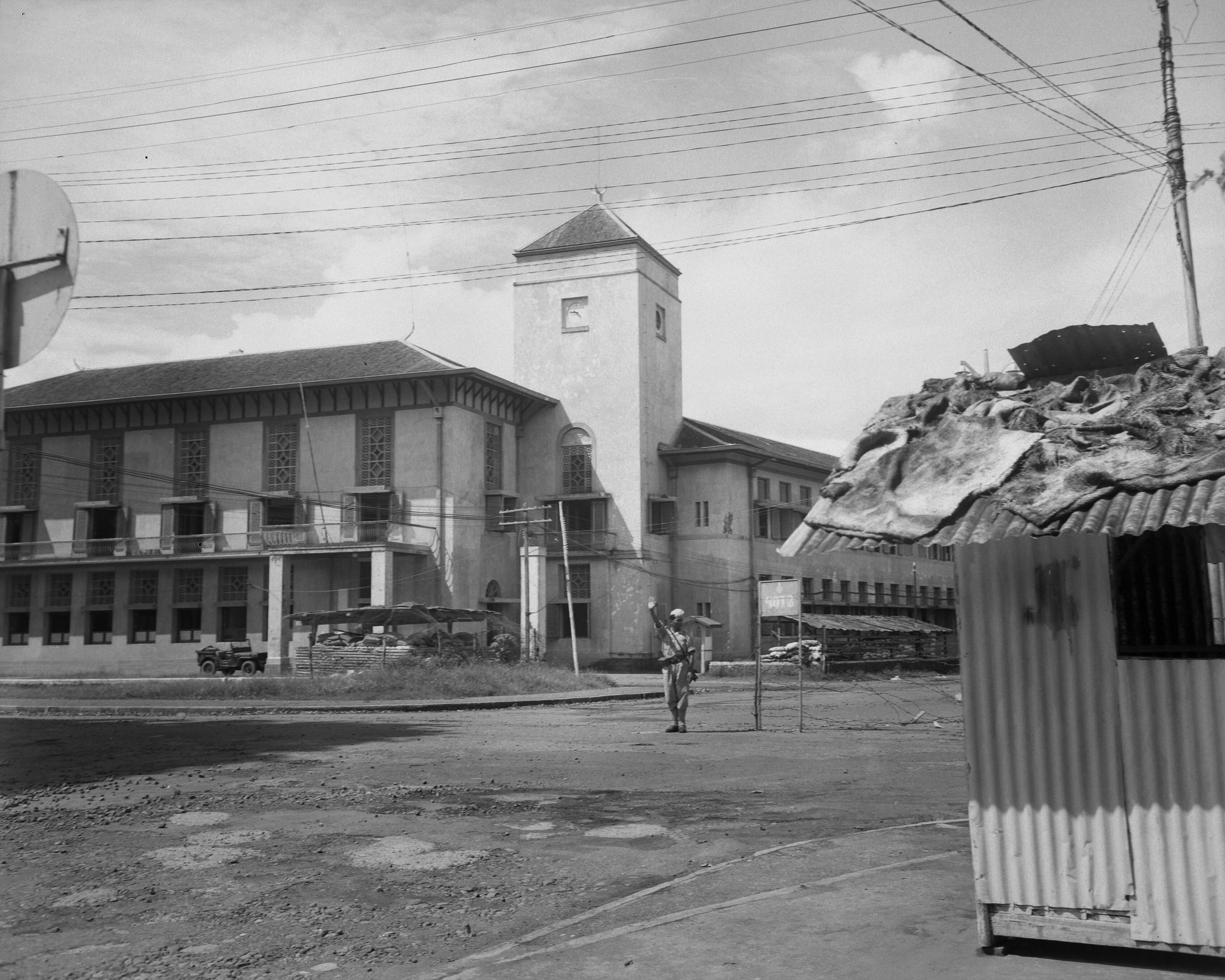
Former Dutch colonial building in Padang, repurposed as the British headquarters, guarded by a Tentara Republik Indonesia (TRI; formerly Giyūgun) post personnel.

British troops landed in Padang on 10 October 1945, led by Major General Henry M. Chambers of the 26th Indian Infantry Division and accompanied by none other than Major General Adriaan Isaac Spits, as the Dutch representative under the U-Brigade. British and Dutch efforts were concentrated on the strategically and economically significant areas around Medan and Palembang. Republican forces in West Sumatra maintained control over their region and successfully operated their own administration until the end of 1948, largely unaffected by the limited Dutch presence confined to the port city of Padang. By the end of 1945, British forces no longer controlled any territory in West Sumatra beyond the boundaries of Padang.

Film of the Surrender of the Japanese 25th Army at Padang City Hall, Sumatra

On 21 October, the Allied officers accepted the surrender of all Japanese military forces in Sumatra, signed by Lieutenant General Moritake Tanabe, commander of the 25th Army, and Vice Admiral Sueto Hirose, who orchestrated the Japanese invasion of Batan Island in the Philippines. Even after the surrender, the Japanese proved as reluctant as their counterparts in Java to enforce Allied instructions that could lead to confrontations with Indonesian nationalists. Japanese authorities in Sumatra generally refrained from using force against Indonesian independence movements unless these movements posed a direct threat to Japanese security. Instances of severe Japanese action, such as those in Tebing Tinggi and Langsa in December (outside of West Sumatra), occurred after Allied forces began landing in the region and were either in response to specific Allied orders or carried out as acts of reprisal. This likely stemmed from General Tanabe, where had previously enacted a non-interference stance once the war was over. He once outlined in a three-point telegram sent to one of his officers on October 7:

1. The Japanese Army must take a strictly neutral attitude towards the Indonesian independence movement.
2. Troop movements of the Japanese army must be directed mainly at the maintenance of law and order.
3. We must strive, with all strength, to avoid a conflict with the Indonesians.

Before his internship, Tanabe reportedly stated, "In this revolution, make sure the army is well-trained, well-led, and has good spirit."

== Aftermath ==
=== Japanese post-war uncertainty ===
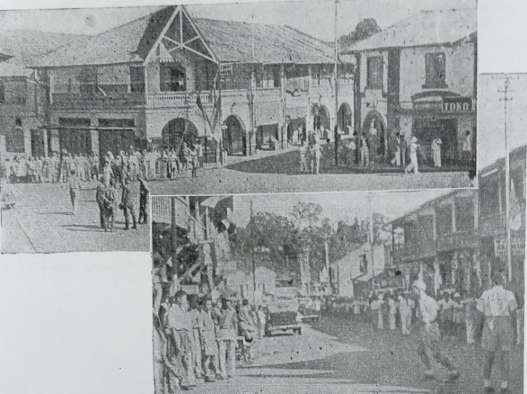
Japanese soldiers still seen wandering in the City of Bukittinggi after the Proclamation of Indonesia's Independence and the Surrender of Japan

Before Japanese troops, who had been disarmed by the Allies in West Sumatra, were dispatched to Pekanbaru for their eventual return to Japan, they were initially brought to Baso and Cubadak near Payakumbuh. Many of these soldiers seemed hesitant to return home, preferring to assess the situation before making a decision. Their reluctance to leave stemmed from various personal reasons, and some even expressed a desire to settle down in Indonesia. As the situation unfolded, a number of Japanese soldiers approached members of the People's Security Army (Tentara Keamanan Rakyat or TKR) and sought to integrate into local life. Some found employment in workshops, while others became advisors at training grounds. There were also reports of officers committing suicide (Harakiri) due to the shame of their defeat. A subset of these Japanese soldiers decided not to return to Japan and were willing to assist in Indonesia's struggle for independence. They were distributed among various agencies in need, including large workshops focused on repairing weapons. Workers from Sawahlunto also participated in these efforts, repairing and manufacturing equipment under the guidance of the Japanese who had chosen to stay.

However, not all Japanese soldiers who remained were sincere in their intentions. Some were involved in sabotage or acts of treason. Some even refused to surrender. As suspicions grew, the commander of Division IX, Colonel Ismael Lengah, ordered the arrest of approximately 127 Japanese soldiers. The operation was carried out by the commander of the Army Police (PT) Division, Major Syafe'i, who brought the suspects for examination to the Payakumbuh area.

=== Japanese influence ===
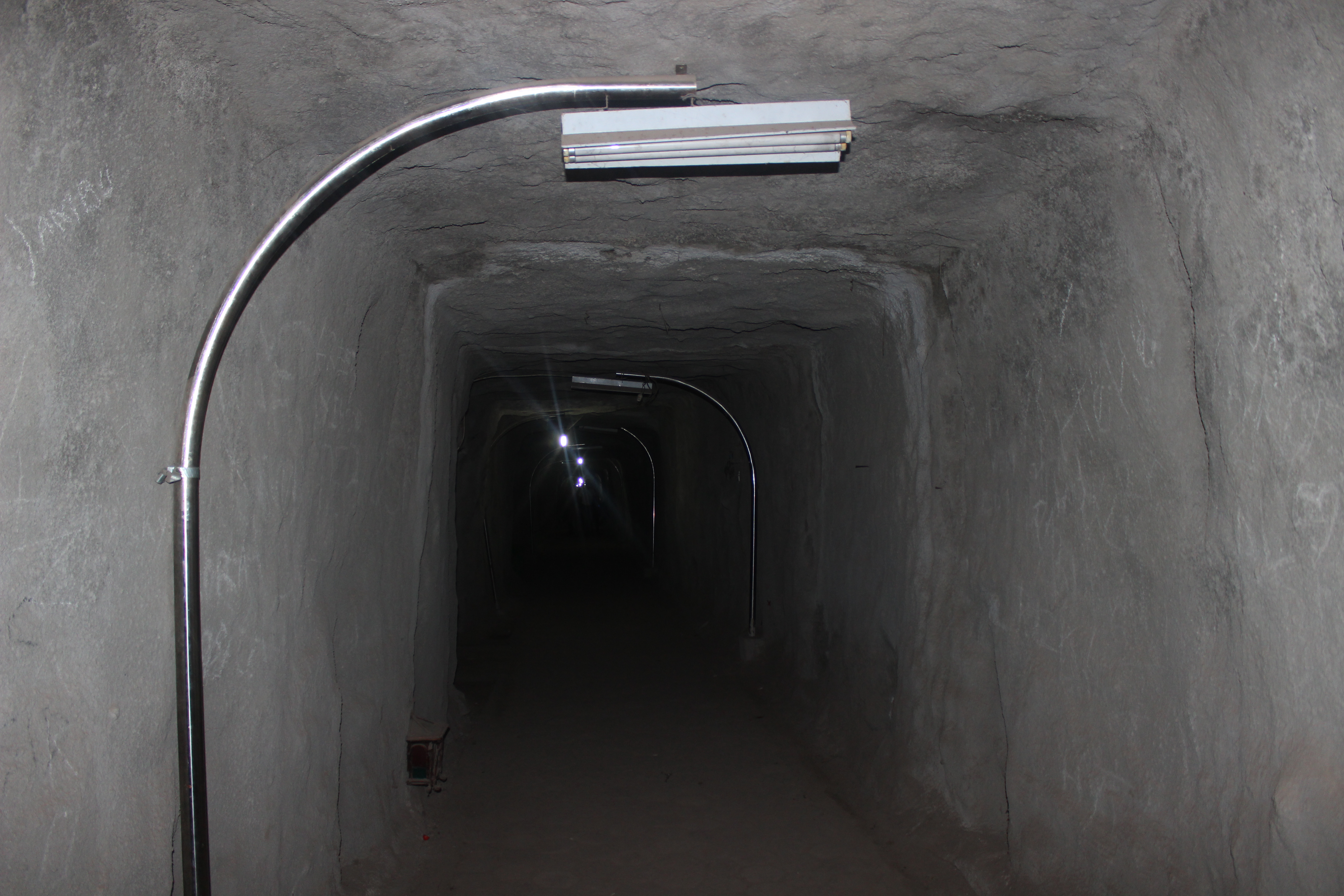
Lobang Jepang in Bukittinggi, a protection tunnel constructed by forced labor under Japanese occupation. Estimated at 6 km in length, it is one of Asia's longest tunnels.

According to Akira Oki, the legalisation of Indonesian as the language of instruction in schools affected the development of the Indonesian language and led to a sense of unity among the people. The education provided by the Japanese accelerated the maturation of Indonesia's independence efforts, something that the Japanese authorities in West Sumatra did not realise. In the political field, the Japanese had bequeathed the form of the representative institution Kerukunan Minangkabau, which brought together traditional and religious leaders as advisors to the resident. Although they had no official authority in the government, they could colour the policies of the Japanese rulers in West Sumatra, and secretly instill national ideals in the people. In the military field, the Japanese provided military training through the Giyūgun volunteer army. The first batch of Giyūgun officers would later play a role in the establishment of the Indonesian armed forces after independence, and most of them gained important places in the military hierarchy during the revolutionary period.

As part of efforts to make occupation policy operate more effectively, Japanese authorities in Sumatra under the 25th Army had, by 25 February 1943, established the Indonesian Language Commission. The commission provided an opportunity for Sumatran intellectuals such as Sutan Takdir Alisyahbana and Sanusi Pane to participate in work on the modernization of the Indonesian language and the promotion of a grammatically simplified form of the Indonesian language. Their work also contributed to the standardisation of Malay in Sumatra and Malaysia.

The song Aikoku Kōshinkyoku became deeply ingrained in the cultural memory of the people in Solok, Padang Panjang, and Bukittinggi during the Japanese occupation. Frequently broadcast on the radio and performed at public events, the song was taught in both Japanese and Indonesian, with no differences in melody between the versions. The song was later passed down through generations, with many who did not experience the occupation firsthand learning it from their mothers or grandmothers. Fewer men transmitted the song, as they were often preoccupied with supporting their families during the occupation.

At the end of the war, many romusha received assistance from British forces to return home. However, some, such as those from Durian Gadang and surrounding areas, did not receive support from either Japan or the British. In certain cases, they obtained help from local government authorities. Nonetheless, the majority of romusha had to cover their own travel costs. These funds were typically drawn from wages they had earned during their time as forced laborers. Those unable to save money due to daily living expenses often faced delays, sometimes taking several years before they could afford to return home. Some, seeing no prospects of going home to their families, would start new families and became acculturalized to Minangkabau society. Some of the romusha who were fortunate enough to find transportation returned home using small boats or rafts, traveling down the Batang Kuantan River until reaching Siak in Riau. After waiting a few days at the port, they boarded a ship bound for Tanjung Priok. Upon arriving, they rested in Tanjung Priok for six days before continuing their journey to Jakarta on foot, as the rail tracks that once connected the two locations had been removed.

Audrey Kahin notes that co-operation between adat and religious leaders during the Japanese occupation of West Sumatra formed a link in the chain of territorial relations and a foundation for mutual understanding, something that was particularly valuable in the years after independence.

== See also ==
- Invasion of Sumatra
- Muarakalaban–Muaro–Pekanbaru railway
- Japanese colonial empire
- Japanese occupation of the Dutch East Indies
