= Saalah Yusuf Sutan Mangkuto =

Indonesian politician (1901–1974)

S.Y. Sutan Mangkuto
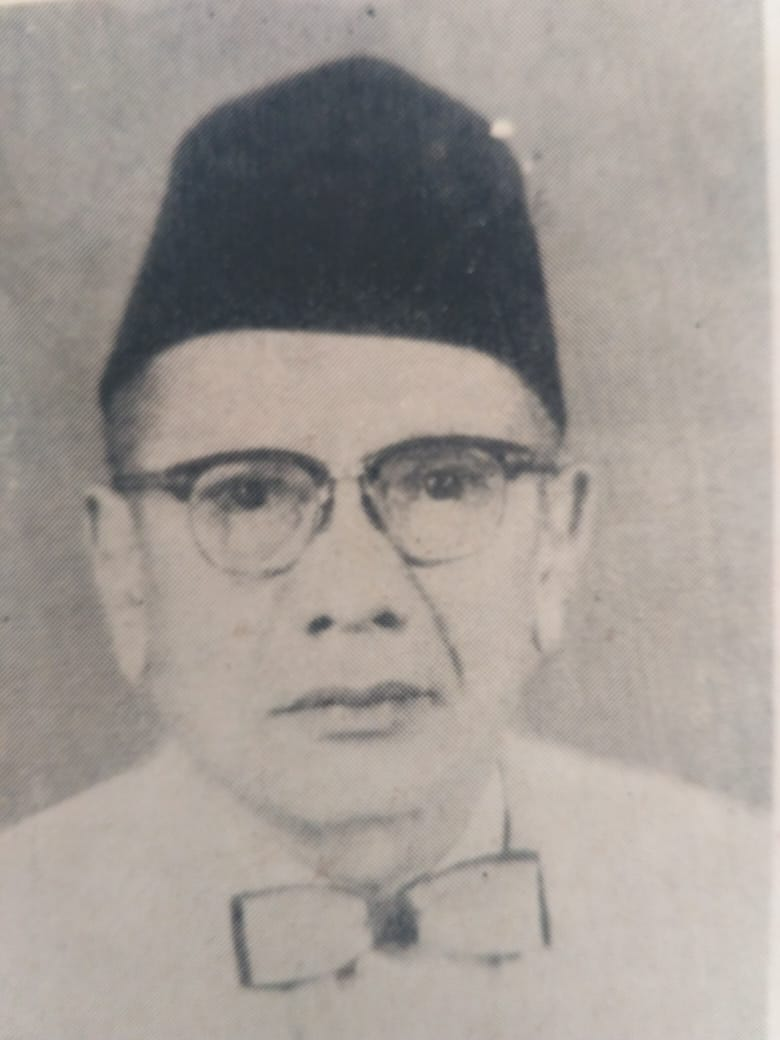

Regent of Lima Puluh Kota
- In office 1949–1949
- Preceded by: Arisun Sutan Alamsyah
- Succeeded by: Sultani Sutan Malako

Regent of Solok
- In office 23 January 1946 – 3 March 1947
- Preceded by: Sutan Diatas Dt. Bagindo Rajo
- Succeeded by: Darwis Taram

Personal details
- Born: 1901 Pitalah, Batipuh, Tanah Datar, West Sumatra
- Died: February 1974 (aged 72-73) Jakarta, Indonesia
- Party: Masyumi

Saalah Yusuf Sutan Mangkuto, often written as S.Y. Sutan Mangkuto (1901– February 1974), was an organizer and activist of Muhammadiyah. He was the founder of the Muhammadiyah branch in Padang Panjang in 1926 and once served as the Chairman of the Muhammadiyah Leadership in Central Sumatra from 1949 to 1956.

Born in Pitalah in 1901, Saalah joined Muhammadiyah from a young age. Before joining the Muhammadiyah movement, he worked as a lawyer and political advisor. After independence, he became active in politics. He was a leader of the 3 March affair in 1947 and was elected as a member of the House of Representatives in the 1955 general election. However, his role faded from public view after he supported the Revolutionary Government of the Republic of Indonesia (PRRI) in 1958.

== Early life ==
Saalah Yusuf Sutan Mangkuto was born in Nagari Pitalah, Tanah Datar, in 1901. He was the son of a Naqshbandi Sufi order leader. He completed his formal education in 1917 but continued to pursue religious studies.

== Roles ==
=== Movement ===
When Abdul Muis began publishing a newspaper in Padang in 1923, Saalah went to work for him as a political advisor. After Abdul Muis was expelled from Minangkabau in 1924, Saalah returned to Pitalah and founded the Farmers' Association as an organization that united traditional leaders and customary functionaries. However, his efforts failed, and he decided to move to Padang Panjang.

In 1925, Saalah travelled to Java with his friend Datuk Sati from Batipuh. After meeting Agus Salim in Batavia, he continued his journey to Yogyakarta in August to attend the Al-Islam Congress. It was from that moment that he began to develop a deep interest in the Islamic movement. Through his acquaintance with Fachruddin, he began studying Muhammadiyah.

Saalah returned to Padang Panjang in early 1926. On June 2, 1926, he founded the Muhammadiyah branch there. He led the branch until 1930. After that, he was appointed as Chairman of the Muhammadiyah Leadership Council for Central Sumatra.

=== Post-independence ===
After the proclamation of independence, he was briefly appointed by the government as the Regent of Solok (1946–1947). In March 1947, Saalah led a failed rebellion known as the 3 March affair. After the coup attempt, Sutan Mohammad Rasjid appointed him as the Military Regent of Lima Puluh Kota (1949) as part of the government’s approach to the Islamic groups.

At the time of the Tan Tuah Motion, which resulted in the removal of Mohammad Nasroen as the Governor of Central Sumatra on August 1, 1950, Saalah served on the Central Sumatra Regional House of Representatives and also as the vice governor. This council filled the leadership vacuum in Central Sumatra.

In 1951, Saalah joined the committee for the establishment of the Pancasila Law College in Padang (the precursor to Andalas University). In 1953, he also became a member of the committee for the establishment of the Central Sumatra Islamic Higher Education institution (also known Darul Hikmah Islamic University) in Bukittinggi.

In the 1955 election, Saalah was elected as a member of the House of Representatives representing Central Sumatra. However, after the rebellion of the Revolutionary Government of the Republic of Indonesia (PRRI) in 1958, his role faded from public view. Saalah was known to be a supporter of the PRRI.

== Death ==
Saalah died in Jakarta in February 1974.

== Footnotes ==
Bibliographies

- Marthias Dusky Pandoe; Pour, Julius (2010). Jernih Melihat Cermat Mencatat: Antologi Karya Jurnalistik Wartawan Senior Kompas. Penerbit Buku Kompas. ISBN 978-979-709-487-4.
- R.B. Khatib Pahlawan Kayo, dkk. (1991). Muhammadiyah di Sumatera Barat (Minangkabau) dari Masa ke Masa. Padang: PWM Sumatera Barat. ISBN 979-709-487-1.
- Kenang-kenangan 70 Tahun Buya Hamka (1983). Pustaka Panjimas.
- Hasil Rakjat Memilih Tokoh-tokoh Parlemen (PDF). Jakarta: Parlaungan. 1956.
- Abdullah, Taufik (2009). Schools and Politics: The Kaum Muda Movement in West Sumatra (1927-1933). Equinox Publishing.
- Kahin, Audrey R. (2005). Dari Pemberontakan ke Integrasi. Yayasan Obor Indonesia.
- Kahin, Audrey R. (1997). Perjuangan kemerdekaan Sumatera Barat dalam revolusi nasional Indonesia, 1945-1950. Masyarakat Sejarawan Indonesia (MSI) Cabang Sumatera Barat.
- Propinsi Sumatera Tengah. Department of Information. 1953.
- Lukman Hakiem (1992). 70 tahun H. Buchari Tamam: Menjawab Panggilan Risalah (in Indonesian). Media Da'wah.
- Mestika Zed (1995). Sumatera Barat di panggung sejarah, 1945-1995 (in Indonesian). Bidang Penerbitan Khusus, Panitia Peringatan 50 Tahun RI, Sumatera Barat.
- Hamka (1974). Muhammadiyah di Minangkabau (in Indonesian). Yayasan Nurul Islam.
- Arifin Suryo Nugroho (2020). "K.H. Faqih Usman: Visi Politik Seorang Ulama". Khazanag Pendidikan. 13 (2). doi:10.30595/jkp.v13i2.6987 (inactive 1 July 2025). ISSN 1979-6668.
- Gusti Asnan (2011). "Regionalisme, Historiografi, dan Pemetaan Wilayah". In Sita van Bemmelen; Remco Raben (eds.). Antara Daerah dan Negara: Indonesia Tahun 1950-an (in Indonesian). Yayasan Pustaka Obor Indonesia. ISBN 978-979-461-772-4.
