= Indonesian philosophy =

Abstract speculation from the people of Indonesia

Indonesian philosophy is a generic designation for the tradition of abstract speculation held by the people who inhabit the region now known as Indonesia. Indonesian philosophy is expressed in the living languages found in Indonesia (approximately 587 languages) and its national language Indonesian, comprising many diverse schools of thought with influences from Eastern and Western origins, and indigenous philosophical themes.

The term Indonesian philosophy originates from the title of a book written by M. Nasroen, in which he traced philosophical elements found in Indonesian culture. Since then, the term has been popular and inspired many later writers like Sunoto, Parmono, and Jakob Sumardjo. Sunoto established the nation's first philosophy department at Gadjah Mada University in Yogyakarta in August, 1967.

Sunoto, Parmona, and Sumardjo each defined the word Indonesian philosophy differently. Without clearly defining the word, M. Nasroen argued that Indonesian philosophy was neither Western nor Eastern. He pointed to core Indonesian concepts and practices such as mupakat, pantun-pantun, Pancasila, hukum adat, gotong-royong, and kekeluargaan. Sunoto also embraced a culturalist notion of Indonesian philosophy, calling it "the cultural richness of our own nation…contained in our own culture." Similarly, Parmono defined it as "thought or reflections…which are bound in adat as well as ethnic culture". Sumardjo wrote that Indonesian philosophy are "primordial thoughts" or "basic mindsets that structurise the whole culture of an ethnic group".

The writers above understand Indonesian philosophy as a part of culture and do not make a contrast between philosophy and cultural studies or anthropology. The Indonesian language initially had no word for philosophy as an entity separated from theology, art, and science. Instead, as argued by Sutan Takdir Alisjahbana, Indonesians have a generic word budaya or kebudayaan, which describes the totality of the manifestations of the life of a society. Philosophy, science, theology, religion, art and technology are at once manifestations of a society's life, which are included in the meaning of the word budaya. Indonesians usually use the word budayawan for their philosophers. Accordingly, to them, the scope of Indonesian philosophy only comprised those original notions of Indonesian cultural richness. This is understood by Ferry Hidayat as "the poverty of the scope." If Indonesian philosophy only comprised those original ethnic philosophies, it would be very limited. Like other scholars, Hidayat widens the scope of Indonesian philosophy so as to include the adapted and "indigenized" philosophy as influenced by foreign philosophical traditions. This article employs the latter definition.

== Schools of thought ==
There are seven schools of thought developing in Indonesia. The categorization of schools is first based on the originality that a certain school contains (like "ethnic school"), secondly based on the influence of great world philosophies that a particular school absorbs and adapts to Indonesian philosophy (such as "Chinese school," "Indian school," "Islamic school," "Christian school," and "Western school"), and lastly based on a historical chronology (such as "the post-Soeharto school"). The following is a sketch of the Indonesian schools of thought and their main philosophers.

=== Ethnic school ===
This school takes Indonesian ethnic philosophies as its source of inspiration. Its assumption is mythologies, legends, folklores, the way an ethnic group builds its house and holds its ceremonies, literature it keeps, the epics the ethnic group writes, all bases foundation of its philosophy. This 'philosophy' cannot change; it remains the same, from the beginning to the end of the world, and it is also 'the Good'. It guides every member of the group to the origin of group creation on earth (in Javanese, sangkan) and the telos of the life the group reaches to (in Javanese, paran), so the member cannot go astray.

This school preserves Indonesian ethnic philosophies which are original, since the philosophies had been hold tight by ethnic members before they were encountered with later foreign philosophical traditions.

Most of the school’s proponents assume that today’s Indonesian people are in the position of being blind to their original values. Jakob Sumardjo, for instance, argued that most of today’s Indonesians …forget to preserve their original values and …forgetting the past, forgetting the origin, they are like amnesiac people... who …ignore their own national history…. Consequently, they are ‘alienated’; estranged from ‘their mother cultures’. The failure of Indonesian educational policy, to Jakob, is brought by this ‘blindness’ to Indonesian original culture. Therefore, the necessary task of this school of philosophy is to seek after, recall and revitalize the ethnic original values, since the values are ‘mothers’ (lokalitas ialah ibu manusia) and people are ‘fathers’ of existence (balita ialah bapak manusia).

The following are some philosophical notions which this school advocates:

==== Adat ====
For this school of thought, adat plays very important role. Adat is the main inspiration for ethnic philosophers, as it is the intellectual legacy which belongs to a particular ethnic group. Adat is inherited from an ethnic's forefathers to later generations of the ethnic group. Indonesians believe that adat is not a human creation, but the spirits and supernatural powers ruling the community. This adat is very different from what Englishmen call tradition, custom or convention today. Its meaning is not simply wider, but more particularly goes far deeper. It includes everything Englishmen call law nowadays; and it goes much further than law in determining the needs and the actions of individuals and the community. It ordains the ceremonies of marriage, birth and death, the times and the methods for sowing rice, building a house, praying for rain, and many other things. Economics, politics, philosophy and art all come within its sphere. Indeed, from one point of view, adat is simply a social expression of the community religion, in as much as it is not a human creation, and in its exercise men are still constantly watched over by the spirits and supernatural powers ruling community. Because the adat which regulates the entire life of the community is dominated by spirits and supernatural powers, that communal life is inevitably static and deeply conservative. Its roots lay in the obscurity of the past, when the ancestors laid down the adat once and for all, or as Minangkabau people say: It doesn't crack with the heat or rot in the rain. In such an environment the word 'old' has a special significance, denoting something venerable, sacred, powerful and full of wisdom.

==== Myths of Origin ====
Among intellectual legacy which the adat inherited to Indonesians is a set of myths of origin of creation. The myths are sung (and only recently written) in important ceremonies held on special occasions of birth, death, marriage, harvest festival, and so on. The Dayak-Benuaq tribe of East Kalimantan, for example, has a set of myths known as Temputn. This Temputn tells myths of origin of universe, world and sky, human and animal creation, plants, water, fire, rain, death, ancestor origin, and some social taboos. According to Temputn, far before humankind had been created, they were two families who inhabited the sky. Of the raw materials used by the ‘sky families’ to create the earth and the sky, finally the first human came into being. He was married to a woman, who was his own daughter, and had many children, some of whom later became seniangs—group of spirits who live in the heavens, responsible for the policing of the most important moral affairs and they are in charge of adat guardians. The seniangs can inflict punishments (curses) on the ‘incestuous’. Their children were not only the human race and spirits, but also animals like wildcats of the forest, bears, ancestor of deer, the pigs of the forest, forefathers of monkey, ancestor of bees, snakes, and many others.

==== Pantun ====
Pantun is original kind of poem created by Indonesians. It is a four-line poem that consists of two parts; the first two lines are called as sampiran and the second two lines as isi. The sampiran always provides an analogy for the isi, and it symbolizes a macrocosm for a microcosm. As the mythology went, humankind was made of materials from which 'the sky families' created the sky and the world, and pantun reflects this belief very clearly. The sampiran represents 'the sky and the world', while the isi signifies 'the humankind'. Both between sampiran and isi there must be logical correspondence, as they both are symbols of harmony of the nature and humankind. Below is an example of pantun:

Tujuh hari dalam hutan || Air tak minum, nasii tak magan || Sehari tiada padan tooan|| rasania susut tubum di badan

The sampiran which says (in English) seven days in deep forest || no drinking water, no eating rice must have logical correspondence with the isi, which says no meeting you Sir in a day || feels like the body becomes thinner and thinner. The sampiran says about the suffering one can feel when he is in a deep forest in seven days without drink and food, while the isi says about the suffering one can feel when he does not meet in a day the lover he really longs or yearns for. The sampiran, therefore, analogizes the isi in the suffering of the longing.

==== Pepatah ====
A pepatah is like a proverb or saying. These sayings are part of the adat in the sense that they give guidance and instruction to every member of a particular ethnic group to treat others well in the community. It is believed that pepatah were created by ancestors inspired by supernatural powers and spirits. The wording of a pepatah is taken from nature, which means that all guidance for people's life must be derived from the laws of nature. Nature has its own laws and it is people's obligation to submit to it. As the myth of origin told, humans were parts of nature; they were made of it, so they had to live in total submission to its laws.

Here are some examples of pepatah: dalam laut dapat diduga, dalam hati siapa tahu (we can assume the depth of the sea, but we cannot assume what is in people's hearts) teaches very clearly about the danger of assuming what is in people's hearts, for this knowledge can only be obtained by asking the people concerned, not by assuming; ada gula, ada semut (where there is sugar, there is ant) teaches the law of causality, in which an effect can be inferred if there is a cause; malu bertanya, sesat di jalan (if you are shy of asking questions, you will get lost in your way) teaches the importance of asking questions in the process of seeking after knowledge, and the like.

==== Adat Social Structure ====
It has been stated above that not only did adat include tradition, custom, convention and law, but it also included a kind of social structure. The social structure bound by a common adat was typified by small-scale communities of people in villages or of nomads wandering over a specific area. These communities were rather like miniature democratic republics. Their headmen were elected from the descendants of the oldest branch of the tribe, and they saw to the needs and interests of the community, assisted by a council of elders. Really important decisions were taken by collective deliberations, called as mupakat. Naturally in a democracy of this type, in which a premium is put on unanimity of opinions, the position of the balai was extremely important. This was the building in which meetings and discussions were held. We can think them as the centers of social life within these small communities.

The principal duty of the village government was to administer the adat handed down from generation to generation, and to settle any disputes that might arise. However, the actual scope of administration within this indigenous Indonesian society was very broad if one compared it to the scope of governmental activity today. it included the regulation of marriage ceremonies, crop cultivation, distribution of the harvest, division of legacies, etc., quite apart from attending to the daily needs of the community.

=== Chinese school ===
The native Indonesian philosophers held their original philosophies until the coming of Chinese migrants between 1122 and 222 BC who introduced Taoism and Confucianism to them. These two foreign philosophies and the local ones then diffused and penetrated; so mixing that they could not be separated again. One of the remnants of this diffused philosophy, which is still practiced by all Indonesians to date, is the Confucian notion of hsiao (Pinyin: 'Xiao', 孝; Indonesian: menghormati orangtua). The notion teaches that people must respect their parents above other things. They should prioritize their parents before giving priority to others.

The Chinese school seems to have been primarily developed by a few Indonesians of Chinese ethnicity. Nevertheless, its contribution to the Indonesian philosophical tradition is very significant. Sun Yat-senism, Maoism, and Neo-maoism are important philosophies that were widespread all over Indonesia in the early 20th century, together with the great growth of the Indonesian Communist Party (PKI).

The main philosophers of this school, among others, are: Tjoe Bou San, Kwee Hing Tjiat, Liem Koen Hian, Kwee Kek Beng, and Tan Ling Djie.

=== Indian school ===
The diffusion of philosophies continued with the coming of Hindu Brahmans and Buddhists of Indian origin in 322 BC-700 AD. They introduced Hinduist and Buddhist cultures to the native culture, and the native Indonesian culture reciprocated by synthesizing the two into a combined version, known as Tantrayana. This is clearly shown in the building of Borobudur Temple by Sailendra Dynasty in 800-850 A.D. Rabindranath Tagore, an Indian philosopher who visited Borobudur for the first time, described the temple as un-Indian, since the relics engraved on it represented workers dressed in native Javanese style. He also observed that the native Javanese dances inspired by Indian epics were not similar to Indian dances, although those dances of the two countries had a common source in the same Indian well.

Hindu and Buddhism—two philosophies that contradict each other in India—as well as Javanese local philosophy were reconciled in Indonesia by the genius of Sambhara Suryawarana, Mpu Prapanca, and Mpu Tantular.

=== Islamic school ===
The 10-century process of Indianization of Indonesia was rivaled by the coming of Persian Sufism, and Sufism had begun to take root in the native philosophical discourse since the early 15th century onwards. The widespread practice of Sufism was encouraged by the massive founding of Islamic kingdoms and sultanates in Indonesia. Kings and sultans like Sunan Giri, Sunan Gunungjati, Sunan Kudus, Sultan Trenggono of Demak, Pakubuwono II, Pakubuwono IV, Sultan Ageng Tirtayasa of Banten, Sultan Alauddin Riayat Syah, Engku Hajji Muda Raja Abdallah to Raja Muhammad Yusuf are sufi-kings; they learned Sufism from eminent Sufi teachers.

Sufism in Indonesia can be divided into two schools: Ghazalism and Ibn Arabism. Ghazalism takes its main inspiration from Al-Ghazali’s teachings, whereas Ibn Arabism from Ibn Arabi’s doctrines. Sufis from the Al-Ghazali line include Nuruddin Al-Raniri, Abdurrauf Al-Singkeli, Abd al-Shamad Al-Palimbangi, Syekh Yusuf Makassar, while the Ibn Arabi line includes Hamzah Al-Fansuri, Al-Sumatrani, Syekh Siti Jenar, and so on.

Arabian Wahhabism was also adopted by King Pakubuwono IV and Tuanku Imam Bonjol, who eradicated Sufism and encouraged Qur'an teachings instead.

When Islamic modernism, whose program was to synthesize Islamic teachings and Western Enlightenment philosophy, begun by Muhammad Abduh and Jamal al-din Al-Afghani in Egypt in the end of the 19th century, prevailed in all the Islamic world, Moslems in Indonesia also adopted and adapted modernism. This is clearly shown in the works of Syaikh Ahmad Khatib, Syaikh Thaher Djalaluddin, Abdul Karim Amrullah, Ahmad Dahlan, Mohammad Natsir, Oemar Said Tjokroaminoto, Agus Salim, Misbach, and so forth.

=== Western school ===
When the Dutch colonial government in Indonesia implemented ‘The Ethical Politics’ (Politik Etis) in the early 20th century, Dutch-style educational institutions mushroomed and were opened for native children of noble, feudal classes who wanted to work in colonial institutions. The Dutch-speaking schools taught Western philosophy, among which Enlightenment philosophy was taught to Indonesian natives, much later than its 5th century emergence in Europe. The alumni of these schools mostly continued their studies in European universities. They soon gathered as a newly emerging elite in Indonesia who comprised the first generation of European-style intelligentsia, and they later advocated Western philosophy instead of their original ethnic philosophies.

Western philosophical traditions inspired most of modern Indonesian socio-political institutions. Indonesia's republican government, its constitution and distribution of power, its political parties and its long-term national economic planning were carried out on a Western model. Even its ideology of Pancasila (unlike what Sukarno always boasted or what Suharto later established) was inspired by Western ideals of humanism, social-democracy, and the national socialism of the Nazi party, as clearly shown in the oration of BPUPK members, a preparatory council of Indonesian independence in August 1945. This leads to a conclusion that ‘Modern Indonesia’ is founded on a Western blueprint.

Even though the elite embraced Western philosophy wholeheartedly, they still felt the need to adapt the philosophy to concrete, contemporary Indonesian situations. For example, Sukarno, who adapted Western democracy to still-feudalistic people, came up with his famous Guided Democracy. D.N. Aidit and Tan Malaka adapted Marxism-Leninism to Indonesian situations. Sutan Syahrir adapted Social Democracy to the Indonesian context.

=== Christian school ===
Together with the Western capitalist search for new colonies in the East, Christianity came to Indonesian merchants in the middle of the 15th century. First Portuguese merchants then Dutch capitalists spread Catholicism and Calvinism respectively. Francis Xavier, the first Spanish Catholic preacher to go to Indonesia, translated Credo, Confession Generalis, Pater Noster, Ave Maria, Salve Regina, and The Ten Commandments into Malay between 1546 and 1547, through which Catholicism was propagated among the native people. Catholic churches were established and Indonesian Catholics crowded, but soon they were expelled or forced to convert to Calvinism by Dutch Calvinists who came to Indonesia around 1596. Dutch Reformed Churches were erected instead. Jan Pieterszoon Coen, one of the Governor-Generals of VOC in 1618, was a good example of devout Calvinist. He put all Calvinist preachers (in Dutch, Ziekentroosters) under his control.

Portuguese-style Catholic schools and Dutch-style Calvinist educational institutions were opened for Indonesian natives. Not only did they teach theology to the natives, but also Christian philosophy. One school later became thousands. There have been (and still are) private Catholic and Protestant universities in which Christian philosophy is taught in Indonesia nowadays. Missionaries and preachers of the West who got master's degrees in philosophy from European universities came to lecture at Indonesian Christian universities. From those universities graduated many who later mastered Christian philosophy, such as Nico Syukur Dister, J.B. Banawiratma, Robert J. Hardawiryana, JB.. Mangunwijaya, T.H. Sumartana, and so forth.

=== Post-Soeharto philosophy ===
This school is mainly on the scene to criticize Soeharto's socio-political policy during his presidency from 1966 to 1998. Its concern is political philosophy whose main task is to seek alternatives to the corrupt regime. This school dared to challenge Soeharto after his silencing all philosophers by violence. Before this, there had been some who opposed Soeharto in 1970's, but they were brutally assaulted in the incidents Peristiwa ITB Bandung 1973 and Peristiwa Malari 1974. Since then, philosophy could only be practiced in absentia or in secret; under the New Order, philosophy was repressed and reduced to ideas which officially supported the state. Philosophical praxis was effectively banned. With regard to philosophy, Soeharto's era can be called an era of "philosophical opium," in which all kinds of philosophy from every branch and school could live but could not be practiced in reality. Philosophy was pacified: reduced to a mere academic exercise and constrained in its content. In its stead, Soeharto elevated pancasila as an official state ideology, one selectively tailored to meet the needs of the New Order.
