= Limpapeh Bridge =

Limpapeh Bridge Jembatan Limpapeh
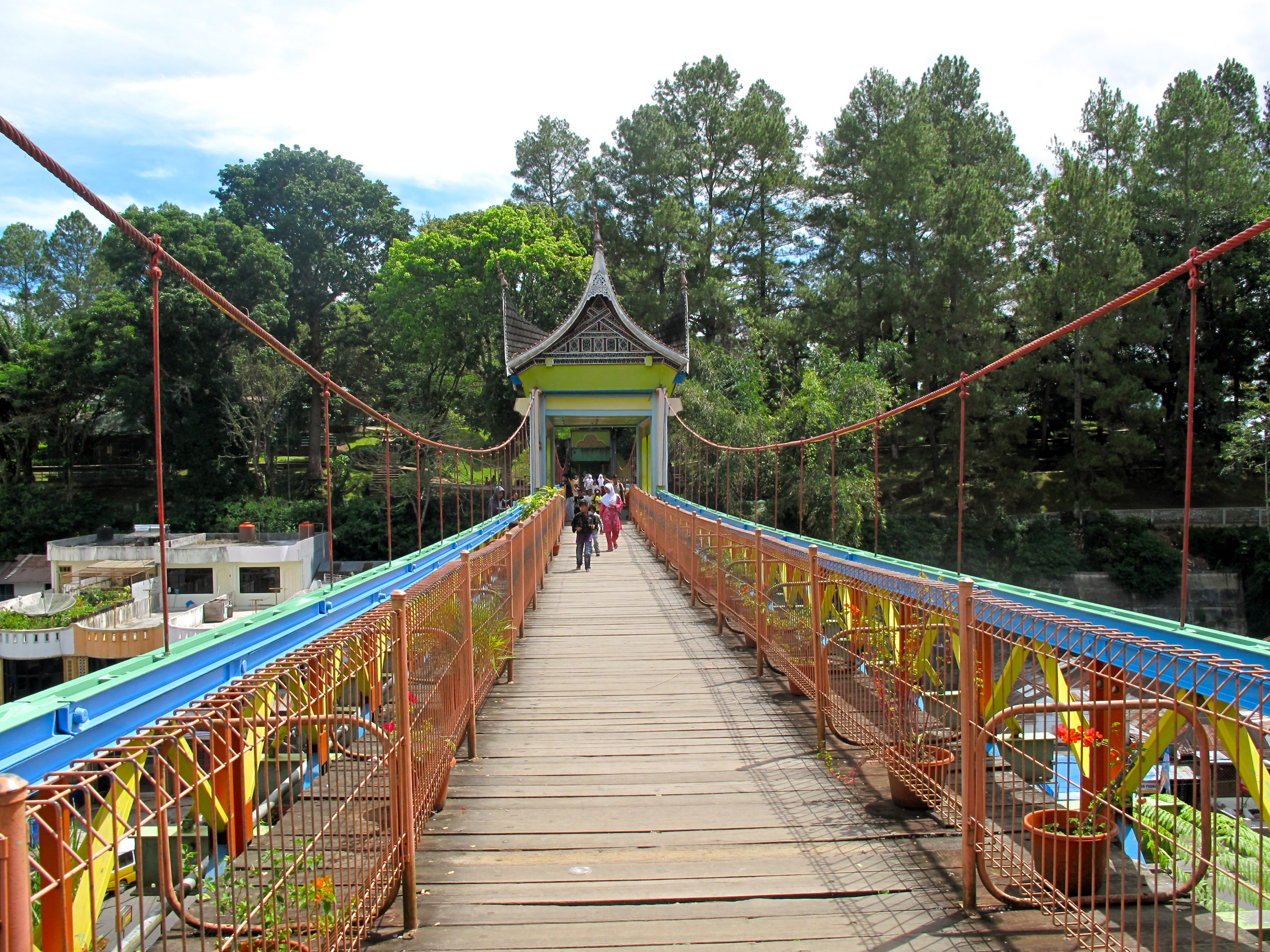
- Coordinates: 0.3007°S 100.3684°E
- Carries: Pedestrians
- Crosses: Ahmad Yani Street
- Locale: Bukittinggi, West Sumatra, Indonesia

Characteristics
- Design: Covered pedestrian bridge
- Material: Steel
- Total length: 90 metres (300 ft)
- Width: 3.8 metres (12 ft)

History
- Construction start: 1995
- Opened: 1995

Location
- Interactive map of Limpapeh Bridge

Limpapeh Bridge (Jembatan Limpapeh) is a covered pedestrian bridge spanning Ahmad Yani Street in Bukittinggi, West Sumatra, Indonesia. Completed in 1995, the bridge connects Fort de Kock, a 19th-century Dutch colonial fortification, with Taman Budaya dan Margasatwa Kinantan (Kinantan Cultural and Wildlife Park). The bridge is considered one of Bukittinggi's iconic landmarks alongside Jam Gadang, the city's clock tower.

== Etymology ==
The name "Limpapeh" derives from the Minangkabau language, where it means "central pillar" (tiang tengah) of a traditional house. In Minangkabau matrilineal culture, the term carries significant symbolic meaning: women, particularly mothers, are referred to as limpapeh rumah nan gadang (the central pillar of the big house), representing their essential role as the foundation of the family and preservers of cultural traditions.

== Description ==
The bridge measures 90 metres (300 ft) in length and 3.8 metres (12 ft) in width. Constructed from steel, the structure features a distinctive yellow and red color scheme typical of West Sumatran architecture. The bridge's design incorporates traditional Minangkabau architectural elements, including a pavilion in the middle section styled after a traditional Minangkabau house with gonjong (curved horn-shaped) roofline at its edges.

The bridge is located in an area locally known as Kampung Cino in Benteng Pasar Atas village, within Guguk Panjang sub-district. It spans over Ahmad Yani Street, one of Bukittinggi's main thoroughfares, and the Pasar Atas market area below.

As a pedestrian bridge, Limpapeh exhibits noticeable vibration and swaying when crossed, which some visitors find thrilling. The bridge offers panoramic views of Bukittinggi and the surrounding highlands, including distant views of Mount Marapi. At night, the bridge is illuminated with colored lighting.

== Connected sites ==
The bridge serves as a link between two of Bukittinggi's major tourist attractions. On one end stands Fort de Kock, a Dutch fortification established in 1825 during the Padri War. The fort area has been transformed into a city park with historical remnants including 19th-century cannons.

The opposite end connects to Taman Budaya dan Margasatwa Kinantan (Kinantan Cultural and Wildlife Park), also known as Bukittinggi Zoo. A single admission ticket typically provides access to both the fort and the zoo via the bridge.

== See also ==
- Bukittinggi
- Fort de Kock
- Minangkabau people
- Rumah Gadang
