= Talasa of Poso =

Talasa
- King of Poso

Poso Emperor
- Reign: 1919–1948
- Predecessor: Tadale
- Successor: Wongko Lemba Talasa
- Born: c. 1880s
- Died: 1948 (aged 67–68)
Names
- Ngkai Talasa

Ngkai Talasa or Talasa Tua (born c. 1880s - died 1948 (aged 67–68) ), was the eighth King who ruled Poso in 1919 until 1948. He was known for his openness to immigrants who want to stay in Poso, as long as they respect each other and respect local wisdom in Poso.

Talasa is a good friend of the Dutch missionary, Albert Christian Kruyt and Nicolaus Adriani, who at that time was spreading Christianity in Poso. They considered him as the greatest king in the history of Poso.
