= Ang Jan Goan =

Chinese Indonesian newspaper editor and nationalist (1894–1984)

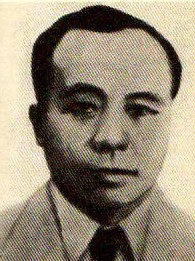
Ang Jan Goan

Ang Jan Goan (Chinese: 洪渊源, Hóng Yuānyuán, 1894–1984) was an Indonesian Chinese journalist, publisher and political thinker, and director of the influential newspaper Sin Po from 1925 to 1959.

== Biography ==
=== Early life ===
Ang was born on May 25, 1894, in Bandung, Dutch East Indies. His family traced their ancestry to Nan'an, Fujian and his parents, Hong Songmei and Chen Cui Niang, operated a grocery store. He had early education in the Malay language and Hokkien and then enrolled in a Tiong Hoa Hwee Koan school. After finishing at the THHK school he went to China to study at the JNXT (Jinan Xuetang), also known as Kay Lam Hak Tong, a school designed for Overseas Chinese in Nanjing. (The institution is a predecessor of the present day Jinan University.) Ang was still studying there when the 1911 Revolution broke out, forcing him to end his studies and return to the Dutch East Indies. Upon his return to the Indies he became a teacher, first at Ciamis in 1912 and 1913, and then 1917 in Tasikmalaya. During that period he became interested in journalism and writing.

=== Newspaper career ===
In 1918 Ang was introduced to Tjoe Bou San, who was then director of the Chinese Indonesian newspaper Sin Po. He also met Kwee Tek Hoay who urged him to relocate to Bogor to help in reorganizing the Hak Bu Tjong Hwee (General Office for Chinese Education Matters), a project in which he was unfortunately unsuccessful. In 1920 he left Bogor and moved back to Bandung.

In 1922 Ang finally joined the editorial board of the newspaper Sin Po. The previous editor and director Tjoe Bou San died in 1925. Kwee Kek Beng became editor in chief while Ang was promoted to be director of the newspaper, a position he stayed in until the end of the publication in 1959, with the exception of the period of Japanese occupation of the Dutch East Indies during the Second World War. Some changes he made to the operation of the paper were an increase in translated Chinese language news, a change in the layout, the addition of editorial comics, and a cut to the pay of the staff. Another decision of his was to purchase a typesetting machine for Sin Po, apparently the first of its kind in the Indies.

In 1925 Ang and his editor Kwee Kek Beng were sentenced to eight months and a year in prison under Persdelict laws. They had printed a critical article about a Dutch policeman who had accidentally shot and killed an Indonesian hawker while shooting at a stray dog. They appealed the charges and it was overturned by a higher court (the Raad van Justitie), with Kwee Kek Beng having to pay a 500 guilder fine.

In 1928, Ang printed what would become the national anthem of Indonesia, Indonesia Raya. He was not the first to do so, as it had been printed in another newspaper Soeloeh Ra'jat Indonesia a few days earlier.

In 1960 he founded the Surya Prabha publishing company which published Warta Bhakti, an influential left-wing daily in Jakarta which only lasted until 1965. Warta Bhakti was intended to be a modern replacement for the former Sin Po.

=== Political advocacy ===
Ang was involved in many aspects of Chinese politics in the Indies during his career. It may have been his second trip to China in 1918 that caused him to become more active in Chinese nationalist politics.

He was involved in the Tjoe Sian Hwee, an organization fundraising for China in its war against Japan. Ang himself was later detained by the Japanese during the Japanese occupation of the Dutch East Indies.

Another case that Ang involved himself in was to join a national committee in 1937 dedicating itself to improving treatment of pretrial detainees in the Indies. However, this was also connected to Chinese nationalism as the committee was explicitly a Chinese-only committee, and the event that had spurred them to form the committee was the arrest and rough treatment of some Indies Chinese businessmen who had been attempting to run for electoral office in China.

During the early period of Indonesian independence, he was also elected president of the Hua-Chiao Chu-jin Hui, an organization aiming to normalize relations between Indonesia and China. After Indonesia did normalize its relationship with Beijing in 1950 the organization was renamed Chung-Hua Chiao-Tuan Tsung-Hui or "federation of Chinese associations", and Ang remained its president for another four years.

Ang was also a co-creator of the Lembaga Persahabatan Indonesia-Tiongkok ("Association for the Promotion of friendship between Indonesia and China"). And he was a member of the Persatuan Tionghoa, a political party formed in 1948 by Thio Thiam Tjong which was renamed Partai Demokrat Tionghoa Indonesia ("Chinese Indonesian Democratic party", PDTI) in 1950. He spent time in prison in 1951 as part of the mass arrests of leftists ordered by the Soekiman Cabinet. After the PDTI was dissolved in 1954 Ang joined the Baperki until it too was dissolved in 1965.

=== Emigration to Canada ===
During the 1965-66 Transition to the New Order in Indonesia, Ang's newspaper Warta Bhakti was shut down by the government and many of its editors and journalists were arrested without trial. Thus, in 1967, Ang emigrated to Canada where his sons were already living. During his time there he wrote his memoirs in English, which have yet to be published in that version, although they have been released in Indonesian (2009) and Chinese translations (1989). He died in Toronto in 1984.

== Selected works ==
- Akoe poenja pernikahan dengan seorang Tionghoa (1922), Malay language translation of My Chinese Marriage by Mae Franking, 1921.
- Diseblah dalemnja lajar malaise (1923 play, written pseudonymously as Hoay Tjiong)
- Djangan sedih (1923 play, written pseudonymously as Hoay Tjiong)
- Moesoenja orang banjak, (date unknown) translation of Henrik Ibsen's An Enemy of the People (1882).
