= Central Sumatra =

Former province of Indonesia

Province of Central Sumatra Provinsi Sumatera Tengah
- Province of Indonesia
- 1948–1957
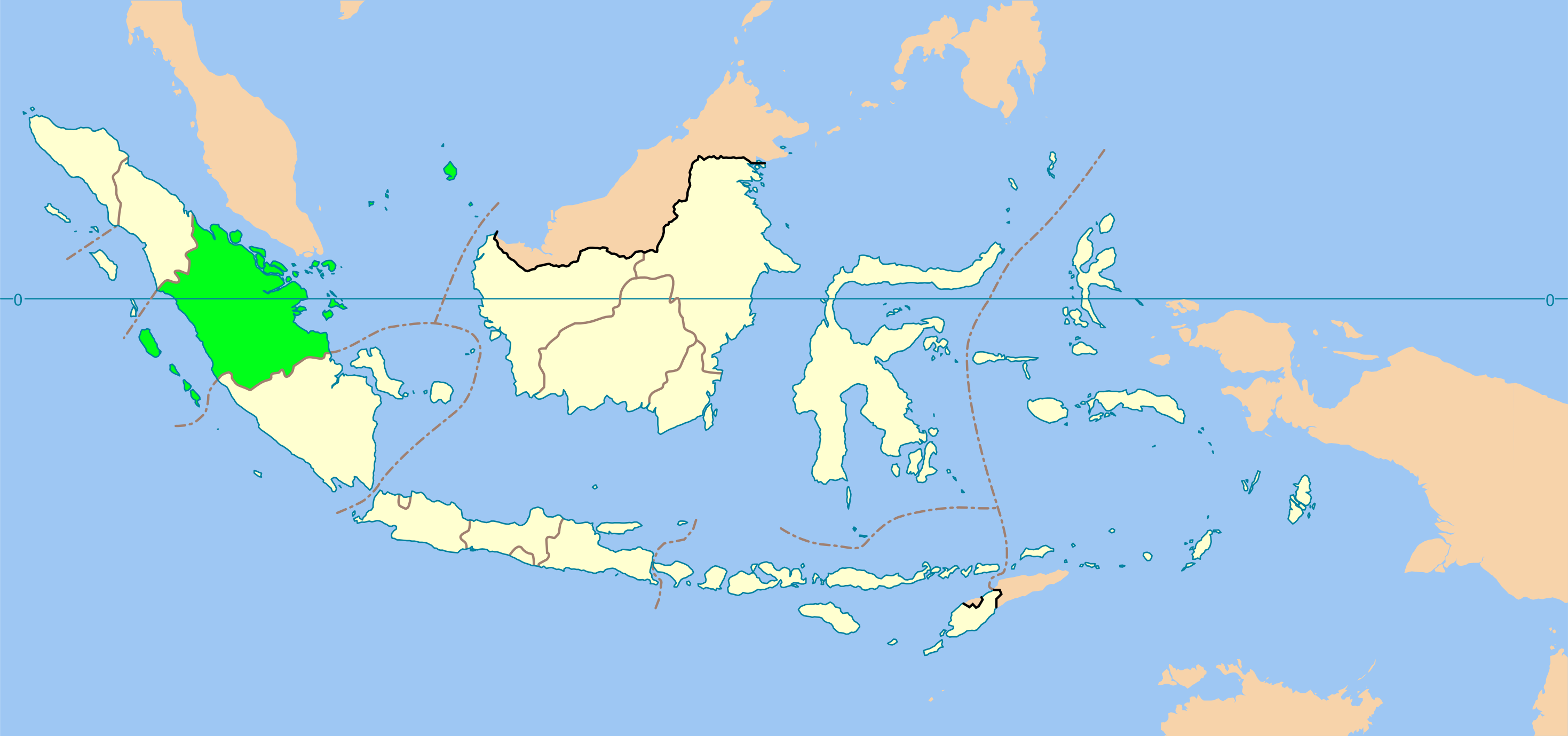
- Central Sumatra in Indonesia
- Capital: Bukittinggi
- Demonym: Central Sumatran
- Government
- Governor
  - 1948–1950: Mohammad Nasroen
  - 1951–1956: Ruslan Muljohardjo
- Historical era: Cold War
  - Established: 15 April 1948
  - Riau succeeded, dissolved into 2 more provinces in 1958: 9 August 1957
Preceded by
Sumatra
Succeeded by
Riau
West Sumatra
Jambi

Central Sumatra (Indonesian: Sumatera Tengah) was a province in Indonesia whose territories included present day West Sumatra, Riau, Jambi, and the Riau Islands. Since 1957 this province has not been registered as an Indonesian province after it was dissolved by Ordinance-as-Act (Undang-undang Darurat) No. 19/1957 and divided into the provinces of West Sumatra, Riau and Jambi through Law No. 61/1958 by the Sukarno government.

== History ==
=== Establishment ===
After the Indonesian independence, in the first session of the Regional National Committee (KND), the Province of Sumatra was then divided into three sub-provinces, namely: North Sumatra, Central Sumatra, and South Sumatra. Central Sumatra Province itself was an amalgamation of three administrative regions called residencies, namely: Riau Residency, West Sumatra Residency, and Jambi Residency.

With the issuance of the Law No 10/1948 on 15 April 1948, it was stipulated that Sumatra was divided into three provinces, each of which had the right to regulate and manage its own household, namely: North Sumatra Province, Central Sumatra Province, and South Sumatra Province. 15 April 1948 was later designated as the anniversary of the Province of Central Sumatra.

=== Dissolved ===
Emergency Law No 19/1957 on the Establishment of Level I Regions of West Sumatra, Jambi and Riau was ratified on 9 August 1957 and took effect on 10 August 1957. This law was made in order to take into account in the development of the state administration and to carry out the government's efforts to establish an autonomous region. With the enactment of the Emergency Law No 19/1957, the Government Regulation in Lieu of Law (Perppu) No 4/1950 on the establishment of the Province of Central Sumatra was revoked, and separate provinces of Riau, West Sumatra and Jambi were created.

== Governors ==
The province of Central Sumatra was headed by a governor, of which there were two in its history. The following were the governors of Central Sumatra from 1948 to 1956:

No	Portrait	Name	Took office	Left office	Duration
Governor of Central Sumatra
1		Mohammad Nasroen	15 April 1948	1 August 1950	2 years, 108 days
2		Ruslan Muljohardjo	13 January 1951	20 December 1956	5 years, 342 days
