= Fort de Kock =

19th-century Dutch sconce fortification

Coordinates: 0°18′1″S 100°22′4″E

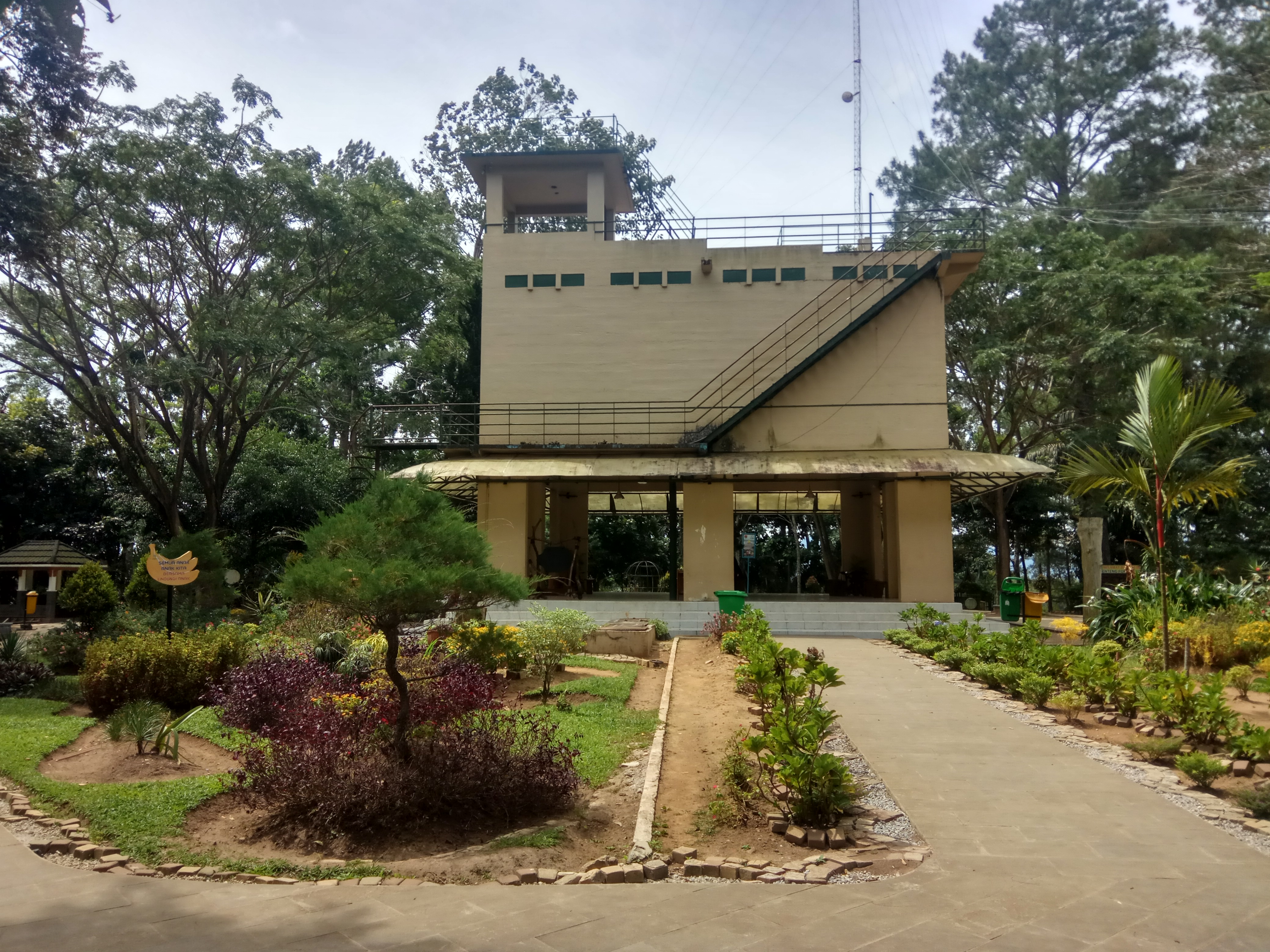
- Interactive map of Fort de Kock
- Location: Bukittinggi, West Sumatra, Indonesia
- Established: 1825
- Governing body: Ministry of Tourism

Fort de Kock was a 19th-century Dutch sconce fortification established over a hill in Bukittinggi, West Sumatra, Indonesia. Around the fortification, a new settlement grew, which eventually grew into the city of Bukittinggi, the second largest city in West Sumatra. Although the remnants of the mound and some cannons can still be seen, the original buildings on top of the sconce have been demolished.

== History ==
Fort de Kock was established by Captain Bouer in 1825 during the governorship of Baron Hendrik Merkus de Kock when he was the commander of Dutch forces ("Commandant der Troepen") and vice governor of the Dutch Indies. It was simply called the Sterrenschans (star-shaped sconce) because of its shape, but later was named Fort de Kock after de Kock himself. The main purpose of the fortification was to provide a defensive point to protect the five adat villages surrounding the hill against possible rising from the padris, especially since the start of a decade long Padri War.

The Dutch were given permission to build the fort on Bukit Jirek ("Jirek Hill") by the adats. The adats includes all indigenous, pre-Islamic religious practices and social traditions in local custom. The Padri movement, who had formed during the early 19th century, sought to suppress the adats because the adats are viewed as unislamic. After years of conflict, the Dutch and the adats won the war.

Following the construction of Fort de Kock on Bukit Jirek, the Dutch built another set of forts to increase control of the region. Bukit Sarang Gagak, Bukit Tambun Tulang, Bukit Cubadak Bungkuak, and Bukit Malambung were taken over by the Dutch. The increasing defensive points allow the Dutch to develop a new colonial government with government offices, a cemetery complex, a market, schools, and recreation area. Eventually this grew into a new city, named the same as the original fort, Fort de Kock. After the independence of Indonesia, the city was renamed Bukittinggi.

== Present time ==
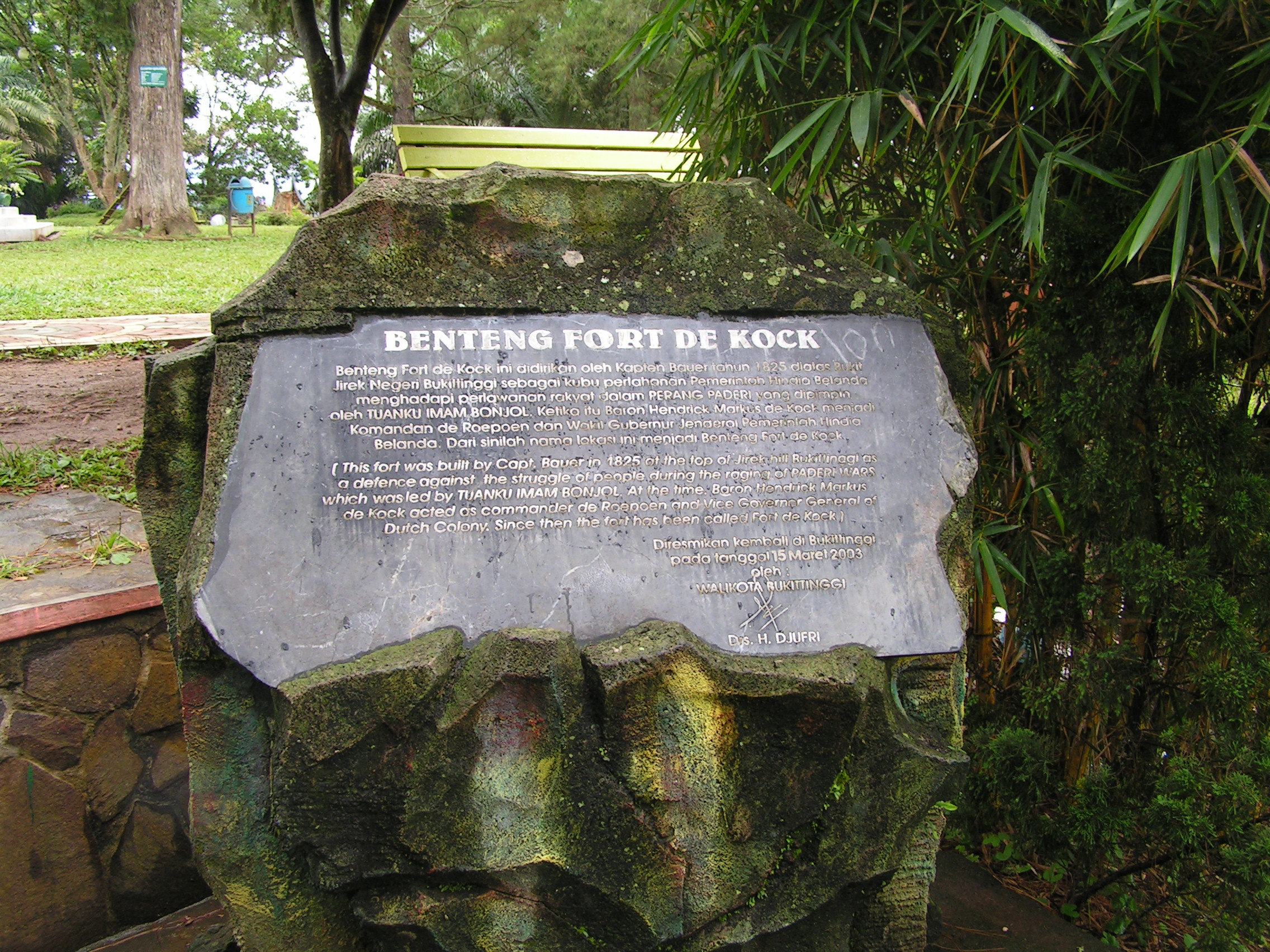
A stone memorial to Fort de Kock.

On the centre of the mound where Fort de Kock used to be is a 20-metre height, white-green painted maintenance building of a radio antenna. A deck on top of the building provide vantage point of the city of Bukittinggi. There is little remaining of the original building on the fort but parts of the moats and 19th-century cannons which are now installed on top of the building.

The 2002 refurbishment of the Jirk Hill by the regional government of West Sumatra has transformed the area into a leisure park known as Bukittinggi City Park and Tropical Bird Park. On a different hill near Bukit Jirek is the Bukittinggi Zoo (Taman Bundo Kanduang) and Museum Rumah Adat Baanjuang; both can be accessed from Fort de Kock via the Limpapeh suspension bridge.
