= Warta Bhakti =

Former left-wing news publication in Indonesia

Warta Bhakti (Indonesian: loyal news) was a short-lived but influential left-wing news publication in Indonesia during the Guided Democracy period, which was a successor to the most read Chinese Indonesian newspaper of the Dutch East Indies, Sin Po. During the height of its popularity in the mid-1960s the paper had the second highest circulation of any newspaper in Indonesia.

== History ==
=== During Guided Democracy period ===
Warta Bhakti was the successor to a previous Indonesian language newspaper, Pantja Warta, which itself had been a renamed version of the long-lasting Chinese Indonesian newspaper Sin Po, founded in 1910. Meanwhile, Sin Po's Chinese language edition Xin Bao (and all other Chinese language newspapers in Indonesia) had been closed by the government of Indonesia in 1958 after a failed regional rebellion in Sumatra which the government believed to have been supported by Taiwan, and due to widespread anti-Chinese sentiment in Indonesia at that time.

The supremacy of Indonesian nationalism after the end of the Dutch East Indies put pressure on Indonesian Chinese newspapers to appoint more pribumi Indonesians to their staff and to give up their traditional China orientation for one that was based on loyalty to Indonesia.

During the Guided Democracy period in Indonesia (1959 to 1966), President Sukarno greatly restricted press freedom and demanded oaths of loyalty from newspaper owners and editors. Some papers that refused to sign were shut down, such as Abadi and Pedoman. However, Warta Bhakti was an ally of Sukarno and its editor Karim Daeng Patombong was a leading force in the Persatuan Wartawan Indonesia (PWI, Indonesian: Indonesian Journalists' Association).

It was only in 1963 that the Indonesian government allowed the Chinese-language version of Warta Bhakti to resume publication, under the new name Zhongcheng Bao rather than its old name Xin Bao. This new version of the paper regularly displayed its loyalty to Sukarno by printing his speeches and thoughts on the front page every day.

The newspaper remained quite popular and a 1964 US Government report estimated its circulation in July of that year as 45,000.

The paper involved itself vigorously in national politics in Indonesia on behalf of left-wing and anti-imperialist causes. For example, in 1963 it declared itself fully in support of Sukarno's policy of Konfrontasi towards neighboring Malaysia. And in 1965 the paper declared its support for the creation of a national fifth column of popular mobilization to defend from outside interference. By 1965 conservative elements in the Indonesian Army were worried that the media in Indonesia was thoroughly dominated by left-wing newspapers such as Harian Rakjat and Warta Bhakti.

=== Forced closure of newspaper ===
Warta Bhakti was closed down by Indonesian authorities during the Transition to the New Order period by General Suharto in 1965. The paper was accused of being sympathetic to the 30 September Movement by elements of the Indonesian Communist Party and was therefore closed by official order. Among the actions taken by the newspaper during the period of 30 September Movement were printing front page comments of support for the coup by Air Force Commander Omar Dani.

Some of the editors became political prisoners, such as Djoni Sitompul. Warta Bhakti editor Karim Daeng Patombong was replaced as head of the now restructured journalism association by an army brigadier general, and the paper director Ang Jan Goan emigrated to Canada in 1968. Many other directors, editors and journalists in the Chinese and left-wing press were sent to Buru Island at this time.

After 1966, by decree of the new Suharto government, all Chinese-language newspapers and other signs of Chinese culture were banned (excepting the official government publication Yindunixiya Ribao).
