= Lobang Jepang =

Historical tourist attraction in West Sumatra

Coordinates: 0.303090°S 100.367610°E

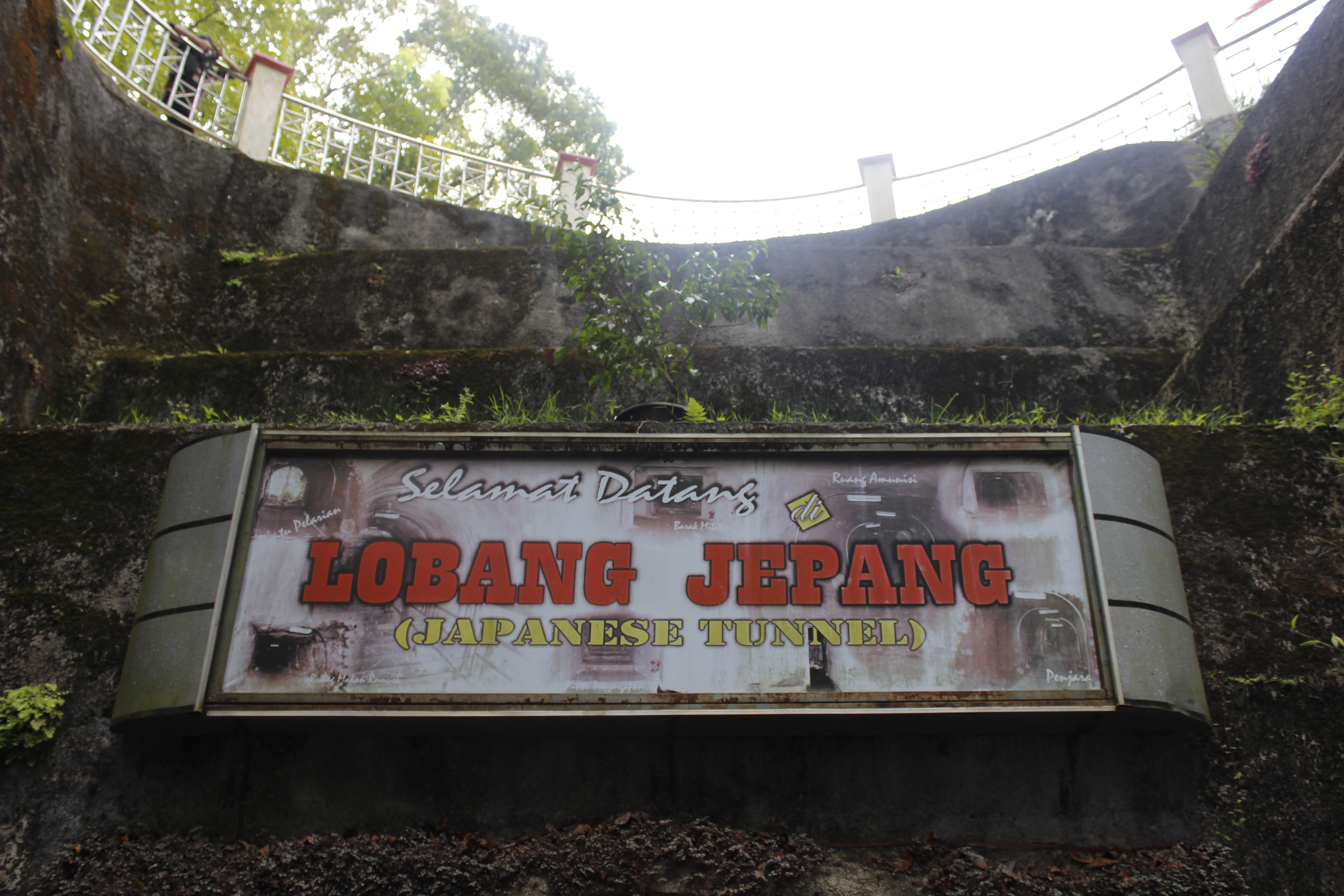
Signboard of Lobang Jepang

Lobang Jepang or Lubang Jepang (which means 'Japanese tunnel' in Indonesian) is an underground military complex, which is now one of the historical tourist attraction in the city of Bukittinggi, West Sumatra in Indonesia. Estimated at 6 km in length, it is one of Asia's longest tunnels.

The Japanese tunnel is a protection tunnel built by the Japanese occupying army around 1942 for defense purposes, which was fully completed in June, 1944. It was first discovered in the early 1950s and opened to tourists in 1994. As World War II progressed in 1942, the Japanese occupation forces in the Dutch East Indies began to feel pressure from the advancing Allied forces. In response, they started constructing numerous hiding tunnels across the archipelago, not only in Bukittinggi but also in cities such as Bandung and Biak, among other places in Indonesia. These tunnels were built as part of their defensive strategy to prepare for potential Allied attacks.

== History ==
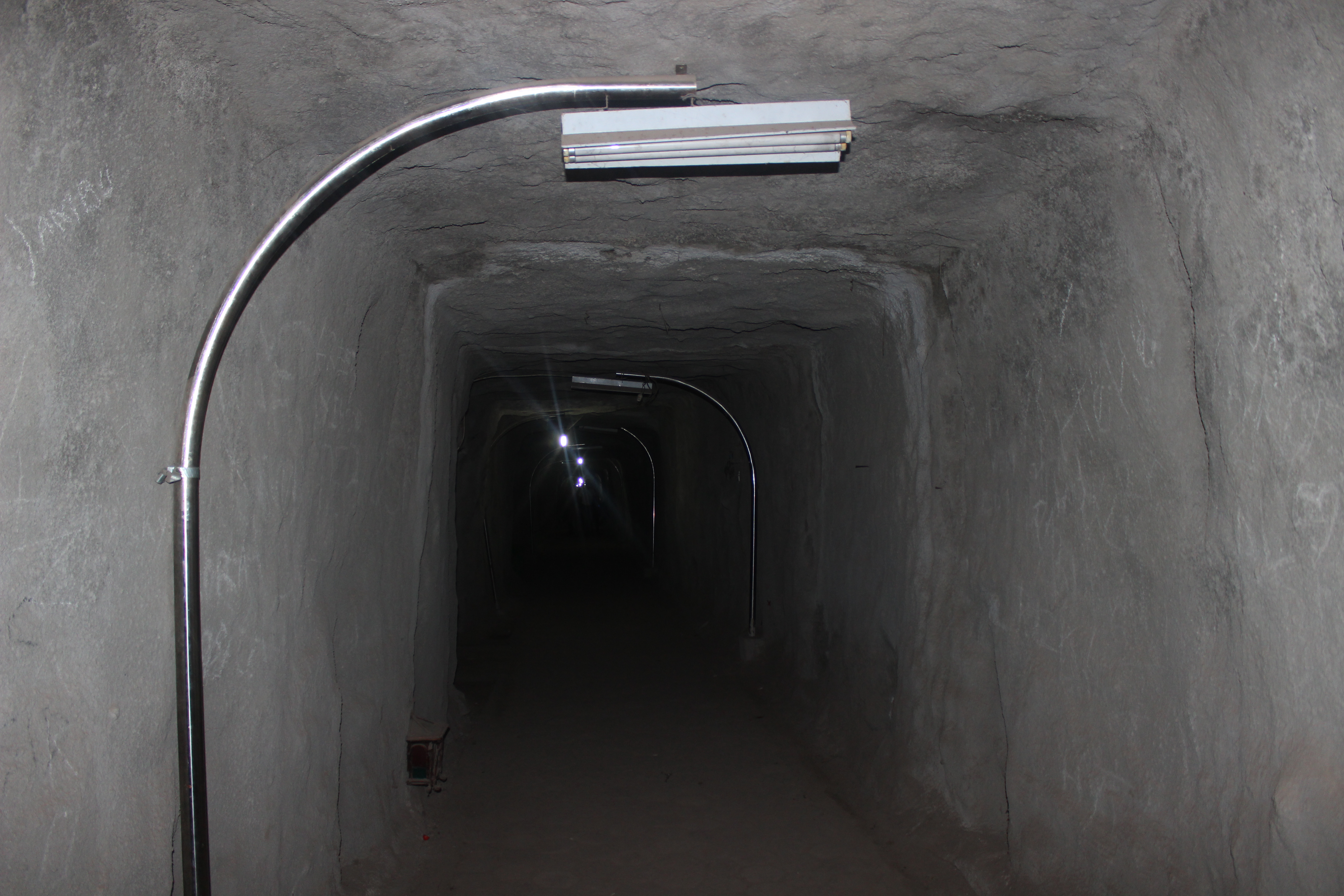
Interior of Lobang Jepang

The tunnel was constructed under the direction of Lieutenant General Moritake Tanabe, the Commander-in-Chief of the 25th Army of the Japanese Imperial Army. Initially, it was built as a storage area for supplies and war equipment for the Japanese forces. The tunnel extends approximately 1,400 meters and is about 2 meters wide, featuring a winding layout. Within the tunnel, several specialized rooms were created, including a reconnaissance room, ambush room, prison, and armory. These rooms were designed to support various military functions, from storing weapons to holding prisoners.

In addition to its strategic location in Bukittinggi, a city that once served as the center of Sumatra's government, the land used for the tunnel's walls was a type of soil that, when mixed with water, became even more robust. This contributed to the tunnel's durability, as evidenced by its resistance to significant damage during the earthquakes that shook West Sumatra in 2009.

The construction of the tunnel involved the forced mobilization of tens of thousands of laborers, known as Rōmusha, from the islands of Java, Sulawesi, and Kalimantan. This labor force was deliberately selected from outside the area as a Japanese colonial strategy to maintain the secrecy of the project. Additionally, workers from Bukittinggi were sent to work on other defense tunnels, such as those in Bandung and Biak Island. The harsh conditions led to the deaths of thousands of these laborers.

== Attractions ==
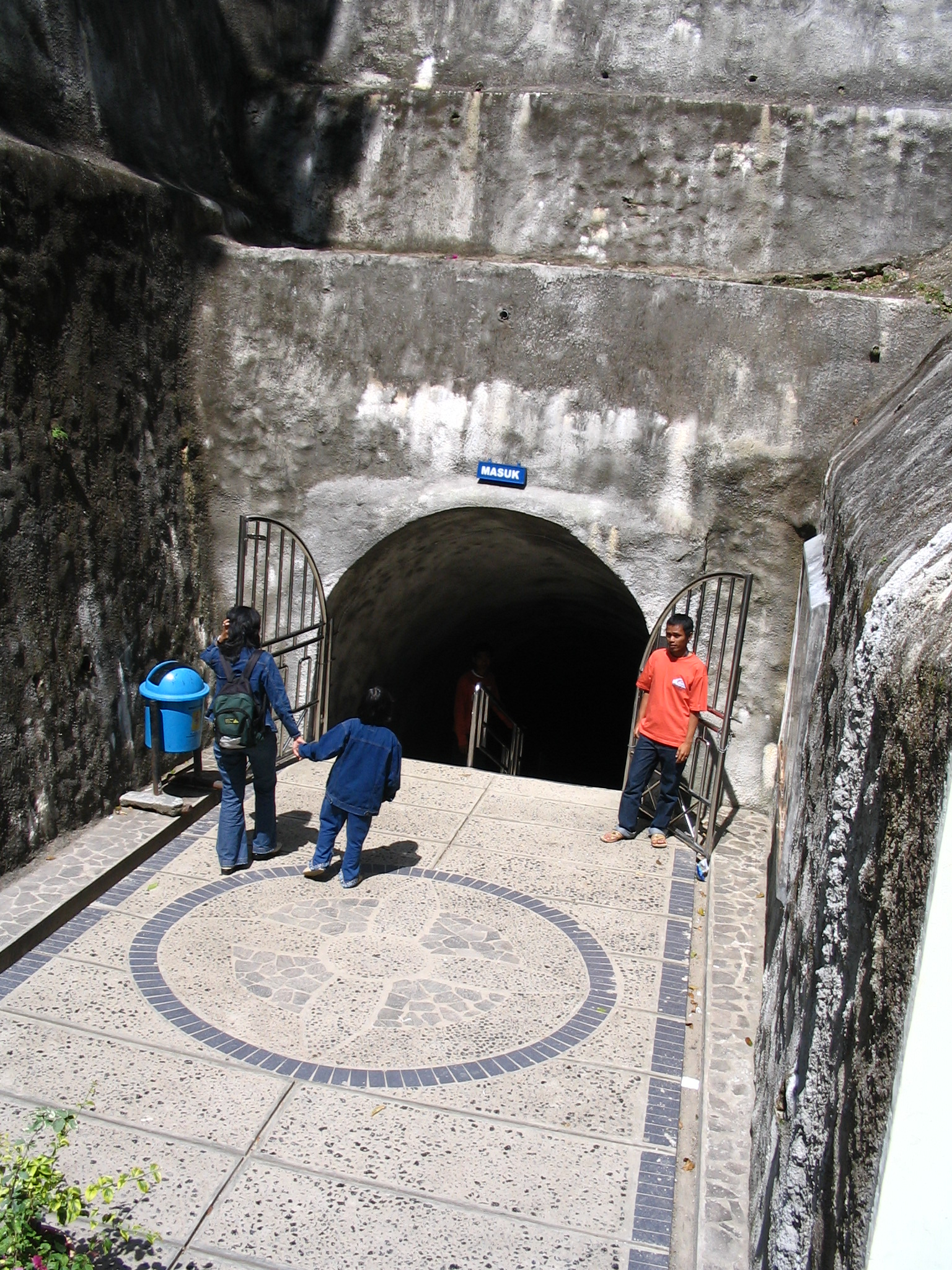
Entrance of Lobang Jepang

The Japanese tunnels began to be managed as historical attractions in 1984, by the city government of Bukittinggi. Some of the entrances to the Japanese tunnel are located in the Sianok Gorge area, Panorama Park, next to the Bung Hatta Palace and at the Bukittinggi Zoo. Only 1.5 kilometers of this tunnel are accessible for tourists; it is touted as the longest tunnel in Asia with a total length of up to 6 km. The winding tunnel had a width of about 2 meters, with a depth of 49 meters below ground. There are 21 small aisles whose functions vary, ranging from ammunition rooms, meeting rooms, escape doors, ambush rooms, kitchen room and prisons.

The kitchen room within the tunnel was used for more than just cooking; it was reportedly a site where dead prisoners were dismembered and their remains disposed of through a water hole. The room contained two small holes. One above, possibly for reconnaissance, and one below, which was used to dispose of the bodies of forced laborers and prisoners of war who had died from the brutal treatment inflicted by Japanese soldiers. The four walls of the kitchen bore various markings, and there was a concrete table believed to have been used for executing prisoners. Before the tunnel was opened to the public, it is said that skulls and construction tools, such as hoes, were found within said area.

== See also ==
- Rōmusha
