= 3 March affair =

Unsuccessful coup against Indonesian administration in West Sumatra

- Part of the Indonesian National Revolution
Date	3 March 1947
Location	Bukittinggi and several towns in West Sumatra
Result	Republican victory; Coup leaders arrested

Belligerents
Indonesia	Islamic militias

Commanders and leaders
(Indonesia) Ismail Lengah	Saalah Yusuf Sutan Mangkuto; Adam B.B.

Casualties and losses
1 killed	1 wounded

The 3 March affair (Indonesian: Peristiwa Tiga Maret) was an attempted coup against the Indonesian republican administration in West Sumatra during the Indonesian National Revolution by Islamic militias. The coup failed and its leaders were arrested.

== Background ==
In the early phases of the Indonesian National Revolution, the residents of West Sumatra had felt that the authorities of the Republic of Indonesia had not been radical enough in taking actions against the Dutch. A local election in mid-1946 saw significant success for candidates who had refused to work with the Dutch and Japanese authorities in the pre-independence era, and members of the Islamist Masyumi Party largely took control of local village administration from traditional leaders. In November 1946, the Linggadjati Agreement was signed, which in West Sumatra meant that Indonesian army units were required to withdraw from the city of Padang, an unpopular decision for the locals. This resentment was furthered by grievances by soldiers on the frontlines against civilian administrators and their officers, in addition to a lack of Masyumi representation in the residency government and the fact that military supplies were allocated almost exclusively for regular army units with militia groups receiving effectively nothing.

== Events ==
On 3 March 1947, the uprising occurred, centered in the government base at Bukittinggi in addition to several other towns. Forces involved in Bukittinggi were primarily Hizbullah militias withdrawn from Solok, Padangpanjang and Payakumbuh, mobilized early that day. The primary objective of the uprising was to seize power from the Republican government, and to kidnap the heads of government there - civilian resident Rasyid and army commander Ismail Lengah. Both leaders had been alerted to the uprising a week in advance and were well-protected, and had preemptively contacted local ulama to convince them against taking part in the rebellion.

Due to the prior knowledge, Republican military leaders had formed operational plans which dictated a policy of minimal violence to prevent losses. The Hizbullah men were intercepted and surrounded, and after just several hours of light combat the militias surrendered before reaching the center of Bukittinggi. They were disarmed, and some men who attempted to escape by blending into civilians were not pursued. Outside of Bukittinggi, the rebels managed to capture some civilian officials (such as future minister Eny Karim), but by morning the following day principal coup leaders had been arrested. In Bukittinggi, one regular army soldier was killed and one of the rebels was wounded.

== Aftermath ==
The captured rebels were imprisoned, but after several days they were released and sent home by the government with money and clothes. The coup leaders were trialled, with the two chief leaders being sentenced to one year in prison and a parole sentence respectively. Masyumi leader Mohammad Natsir (who originated from West Sumatra) travelled to Bukittinggi leading a Masyumi delegation to investigate the incident, concluding that the Masyumi party itself was uninvolved in the incident, though it involved a number of its members.

Leaders of the Indonesian central government changed their attitudes towards West Sumatra in the aftermath of the incident. The local government decided that the Islamic militias had to be included in the military command structure, and they were later integrated in a process which completed later that year.

== Bibliography ==
- Bahar, Saafroedin (2015). Etnik, Elite dan Integrasi Nasional: Minangkabau 1945-1984 Republik Indonesia 1985-2015 (in Indonesian). Gre Publishing.
- Kahin, Audrey (1999). Rebellion to Integration: West Sumatra and the Indonesian Polity, 1926-1998. Amsterdam University Press. ISBN 978-90-5356-395-3.
