= Jam Gadang =

Clocktower and landmark in West Sumatra, Indonesia

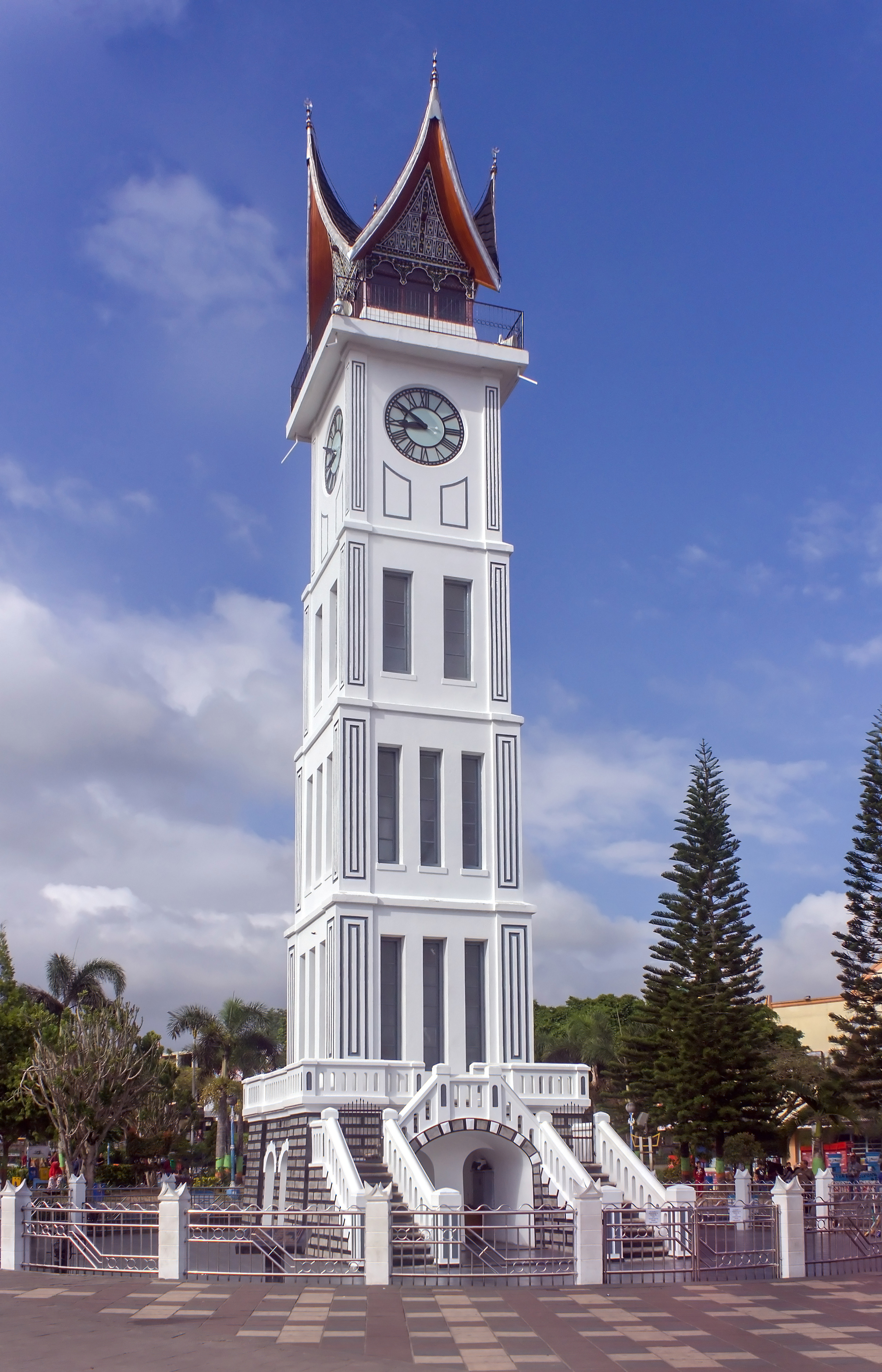
- Jam Gadang in February 2017
- Interactive map of Jam Gadang
- Location: Bukittinggi
- Coordinates: 0.3052°S 100.3696°E
- Designer: Yazid Abidin, Sutan Gigi Ameh & Haji Moran
- Height: 26 metres (85 ft)
- Beginning date: 1926
- Completion date: 1926
- Dedicated to: Bukittinggi City Secretary

Jam Gadang (Minangkabau for "Big Clock"; Jawi: جام غدانغ ) is a clock tower, major landmark, and tourist attraction in the city of Bukittinggi, West Sumatra, Indonesia. It is in the centre of the city, near the main market, Pasar Ateh. It has large clocks on each face.

== History ==
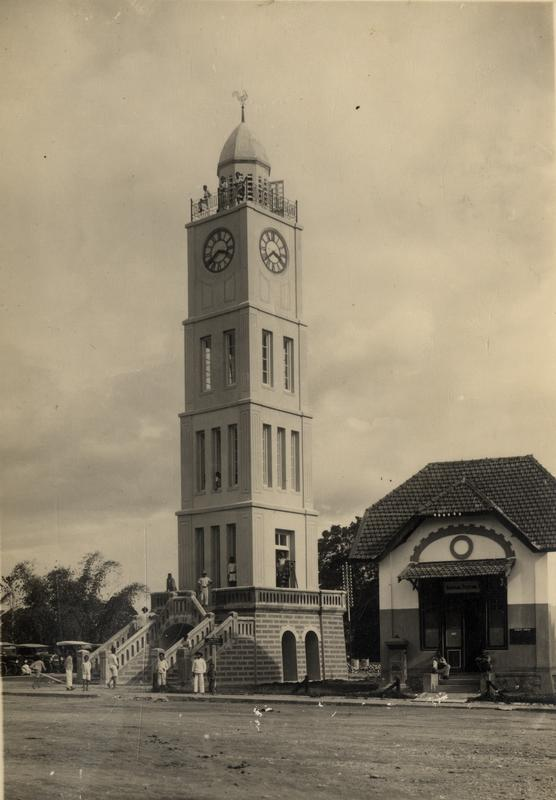
The original clock tower before shape alteration.

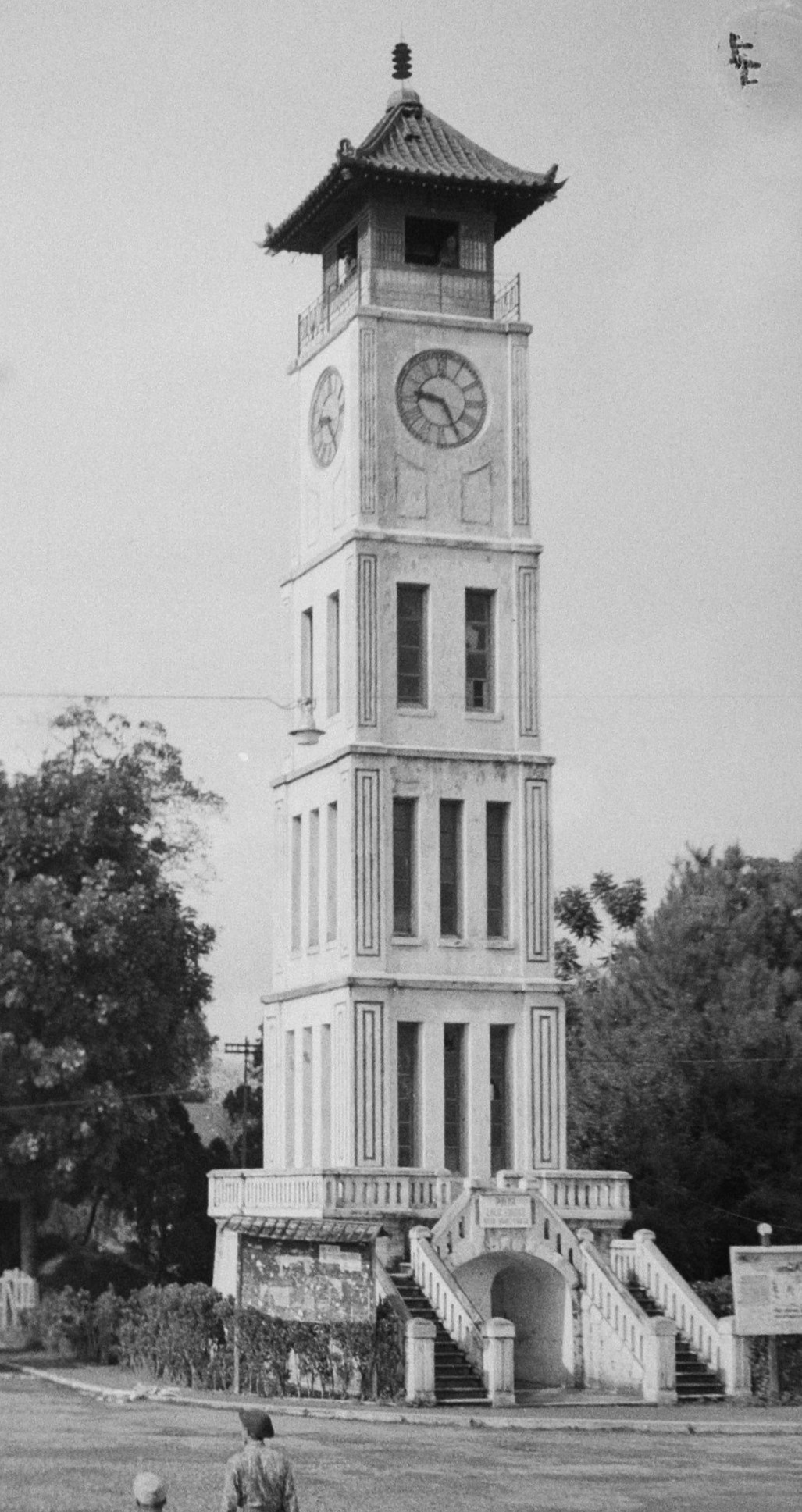
The clock tower during Japanese Occupation.

Jam Gadang is located in central Bukittinggi, a city in the Minangkabau Highlands of West Sumatra. It sits in the middle of the Sabai Nan Aluih Park, near the Ateh Market and palace of Mohammad Hatta. The structure was built in 1926, during the Dutch colonial era, as a gift from Queen Wilhelmina to the city's controleur. It was designed by architects Yazid Abidin and Sutan Gigi Ameh, reportedly at a cost of 3,000 guilder.

Originally a rooster figure was placed on the apex, but it was changed into a Sōrin spire used in Shinto shrine architecture during the Japanese occupation in West Sumatra (1942–1945). The roof of the tower was then remodeled to closely follow a Japanese pagoda roofing. Following Indonesian independence, the tower's top was reshaped to its present form, which resembles traditional Minang roofs (see Rumah Gadang). The internal mechanisms of the clock are twin to those in the Elizabeth Tower (Big Ben) in London.

On March 6, 2007, the Jam Gadang tower was damaged by two earthquakes that struck western Sumatra. Over the following years it was refurbished by the Indonesia Heritage Trust (Badan Pelestarian Pusaka Indonesia). Funding for the 600 million rupiah (approximately 55 thousand euros) restoration came from the Netherlands. The refurbished tower was inaugurated on December 22, 2010, as part of Bukittinggi's 262nd anniversary celebrations.

The Jam Gadang tower has been used as an observation post during fires, such as one that affected the Ateh Market. During Ramadhan, the call to prayer that marks the breaking of the fast is sounded from the tower.

== Clock structure and location ==
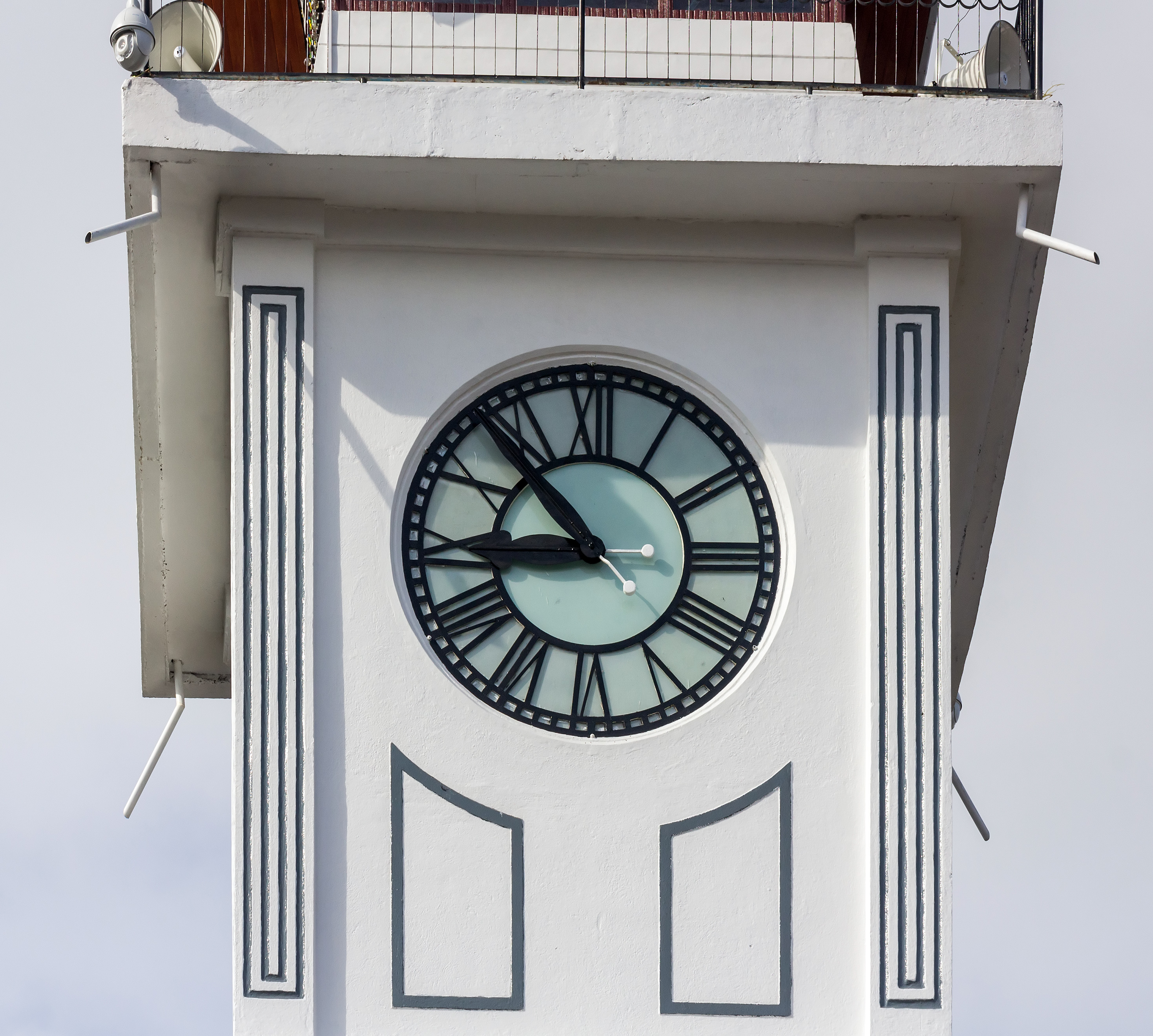
Jam Gadang uses 'IIII' instead of 'IV'

The tower has four clocks made in Recklinghausen, Germany by Bernard Vortmann and shipped via Rotterdam. Each clock face has a diameter of 80 centimetres (31 in). The tower's base is 13 by 4 metres (43 ft × 13 ft) and it stands 26 metres (85 ft) tall. The clocks use "IIII" for the number 4 instead of the traditional Roman numeral "IV".

The laying of the tower's cornerstone was done by the 6-year-old son of Rook Maker, the city secretary of Bukittinggi at the time.

== Tourism ==
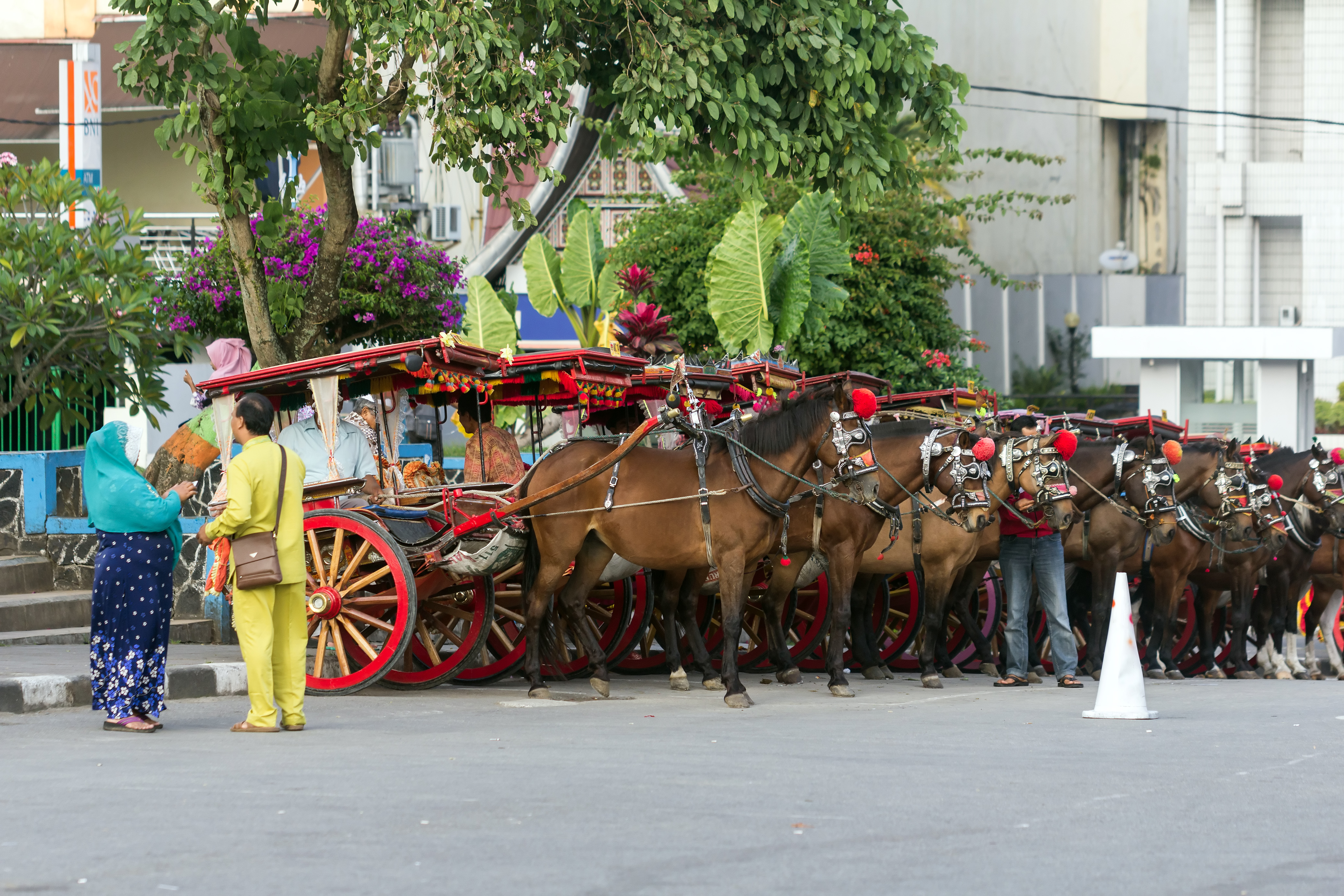
Bendi carriages for sightseeing

The Jam Gadang tower is considered an icon of Bukittinggi and the city's main tourist attraction. Given its iconic appearance, the structure is a frequent object of local souvenirs. It is printed on apparel, painted, used as model for sculpting and magnet design, and so forth. It is common for tourists visiting Bukittinggi to take photographs in front of the tower, and local residents offer photography services for this purpose. Tourists visiting the tower were once allowed to climb to the top, but as of 2016 require written permission to do so. Many people visit the Jam Gadang with family or friends.

Many hotels are near Jam Gadang, as are traditional horse-drawn carriages called bendi. Since 2016, the Jam Gadang plaza has hosted traditional Minang dances for tourists. It also serves as the centre of New Year celebration in Bukittinggi.
