= Mohammad Nasroen =

Minangkabau philosophy scholar and politician

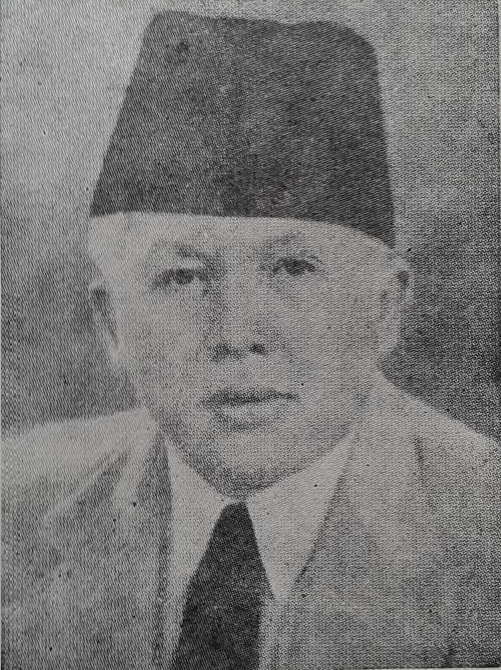

1st Governor of Central Sumatra
- In office 15 April 1948 – 1 August 1950
- Preceded by: office established
- Succeeded by: Ruslan Muljohardjo

Minister of Justice
- In office 20 November 1951 – 3 April 1952
- Preceded by: M. A, Pellaupessy
- Succeeded by: Lukman Wiriadinata

Personal details
- Born: October 29, 1907
- Died: September 28, 1968 (aged 60)
- Profession: Politician, Professor of the University of Indonesia

Prof. Mr. Mohammad Nasroen (Indonesian: Muhammad Nasrun, 29 October 1907 – 28 September 1968) was a Minangkabau bureaucrat, Indonesian philosophy scholar, professor of philosophy at the University of Indonesia, and a politician. He served as the first governor of Central Sumatra from 15 April 1948 to 1 August 1950, and he was the Minister of Justice in the Sukiman Cabinet from 20 November 1951 to 3 April 1952 replacing M. A. Pellaupessy.

== Legacy ==
He is most famous for having identified and classified Indonesian philosophy as being separate and different from Western and Eastern philosophy. Nasroen reached the peak of his philosophical career when he was chosen as an emeritus professor of philosophy at the University of Indonesia in Jakarta, one of Indonesia's largest and most respected universities.

His 1967 book, Falsafah Indonesia, laid the way for Indonesian scholars to start treating "Indonesian Philosophy" as a separate area of study. In it, Nasroen argues that the uniqueness of Indonesian philosophy is manifested in philosophical notions, such as mupakat, pantun-pantun, Pancasila, hukum adat, ketuhanan, gotong-royong (mutual aid), and kekeluargaan (Falsafah Indonesia pp. 14, 24, 25, 33, and 38).

Nasroen is also remembered for his work on the philosophy and the customs of the Minangkabau people of Indonesia's West Sumatra province, presented in his 1957 book Dasar Falsafah Adat Minangkabau. This book is still commonly cited in the fields of women's studies, such as in the writings of feminist ethnographer Peggy Reeves Sanday, as Nasroen's book was one of the first to explain the concept of matriarchy in the Minangkabau matrilineal system.

Nasroen was also interested in the issue of the diversity of Minangkabau customs. Some of Muhammad Nasroen's famous writings are Autonomous Regions at the Lowest Level (Daerah Otonomi Tingkat Terbawah), State Joints and the Implementation of Autonomy (Sendi Negara dan Pelaksanaan Otonomi), Problems Around Autonomy (Masalah Sekitar Otonomi), Origins of a State (Asal Mula Negara), and the Basic Philosophy of Minangkabau Customs (Dasar Falsafah Adat Minangkabau).
