= Bukittinggi =

City in West Sumatra, Indonesia

Bukittinggi Fort de Kock
- City
- City of Bukittinggi; Kota Bukittinggi

Other transcription(s)
  - Jawi: بوكيت تيڠڬي
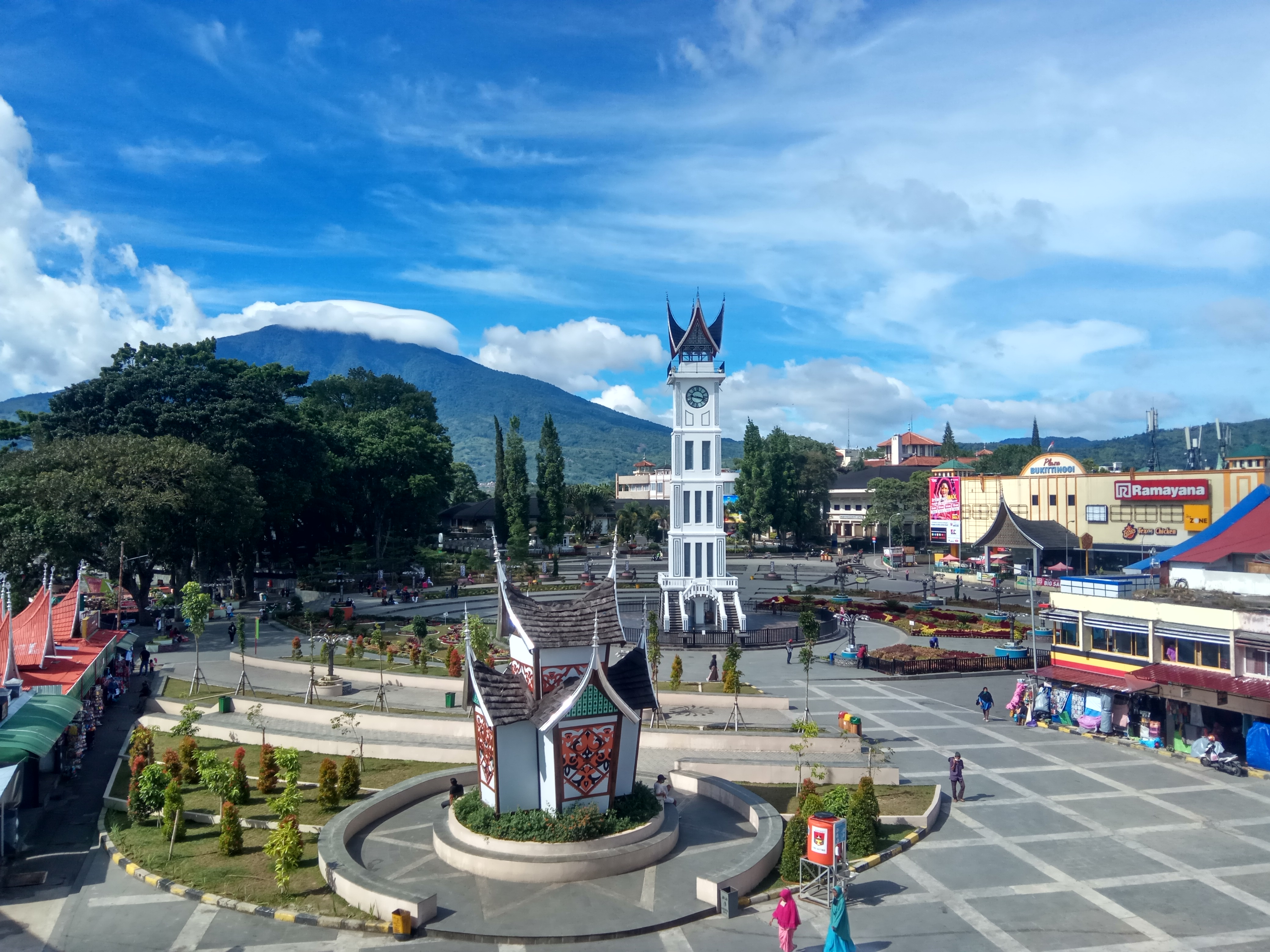
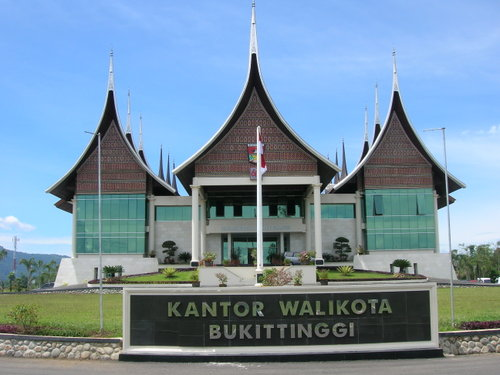
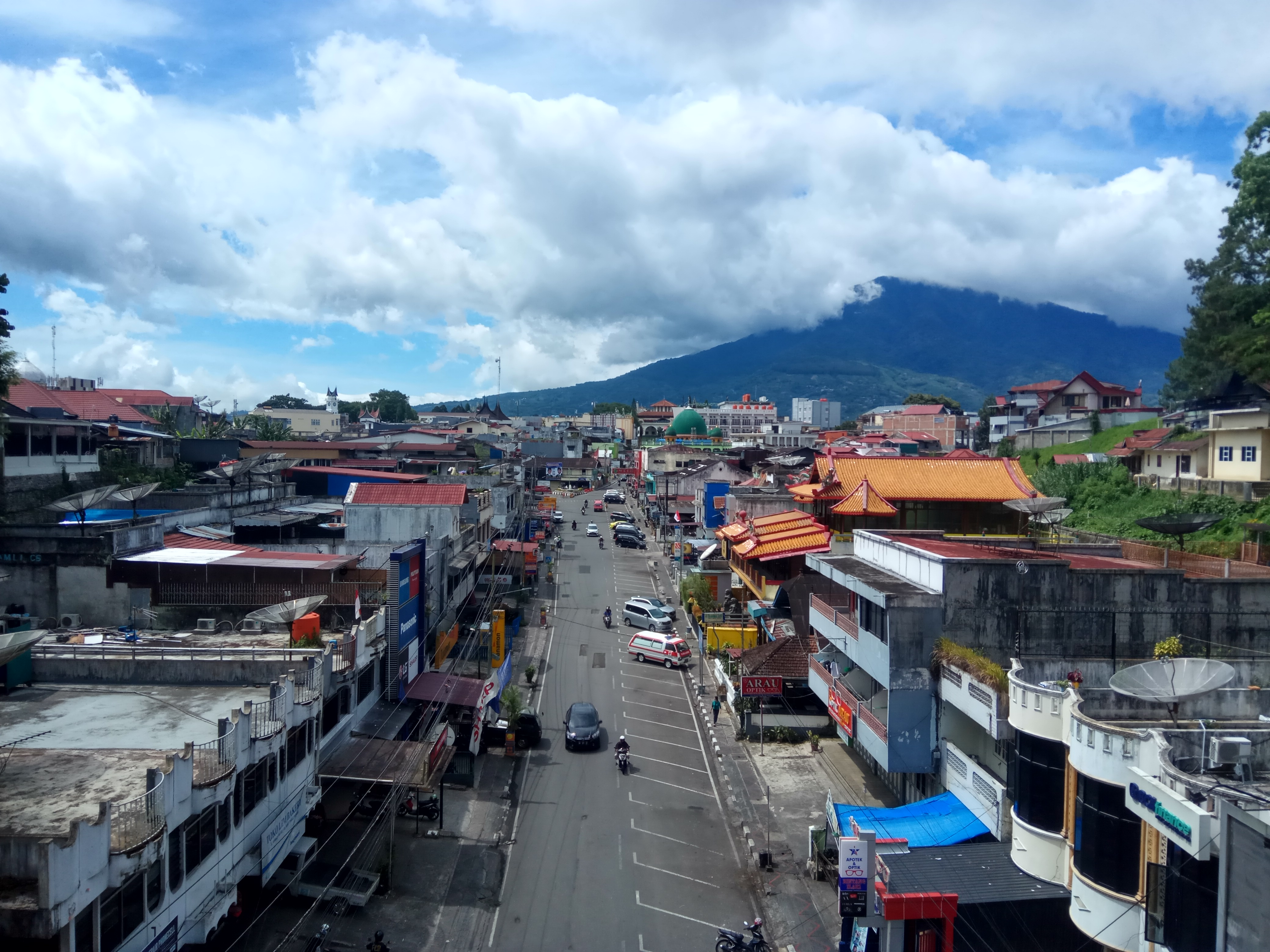
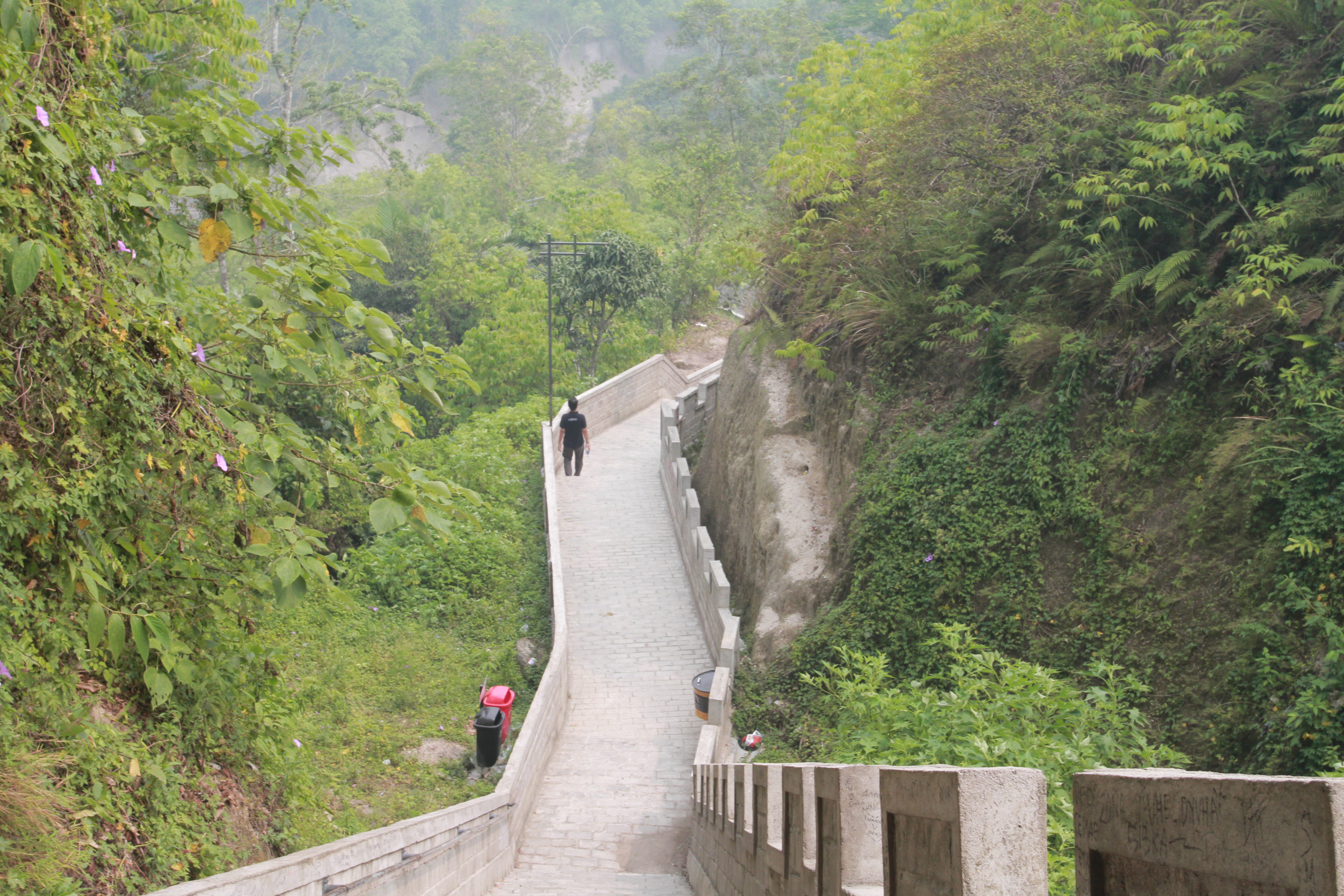
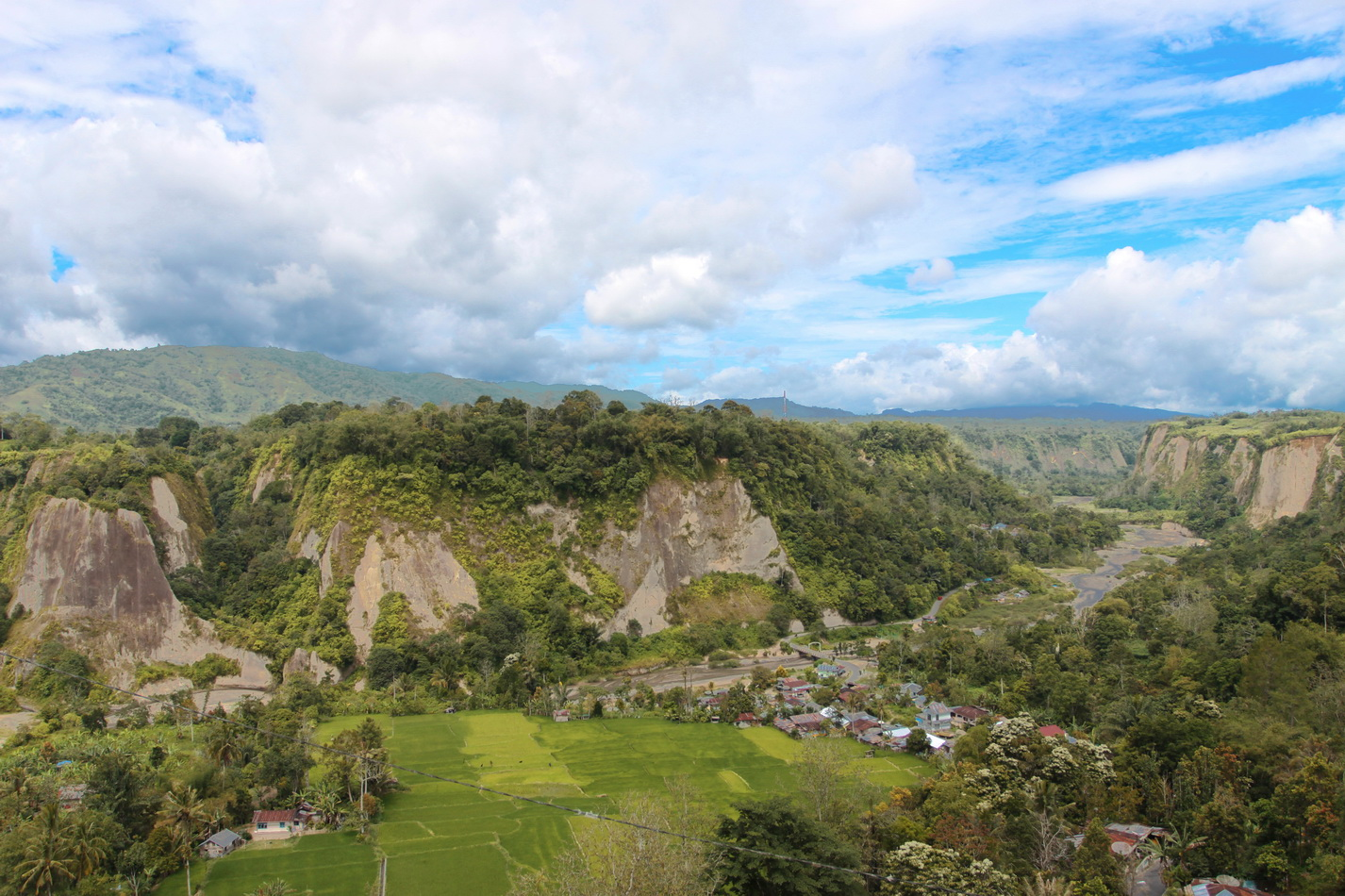
- View of Bukittinggi with Jam Gadang; Bukittinggi Town Hall; Ahmad Yani Street; Janjang Koto Gadang; Ngarai Sianok

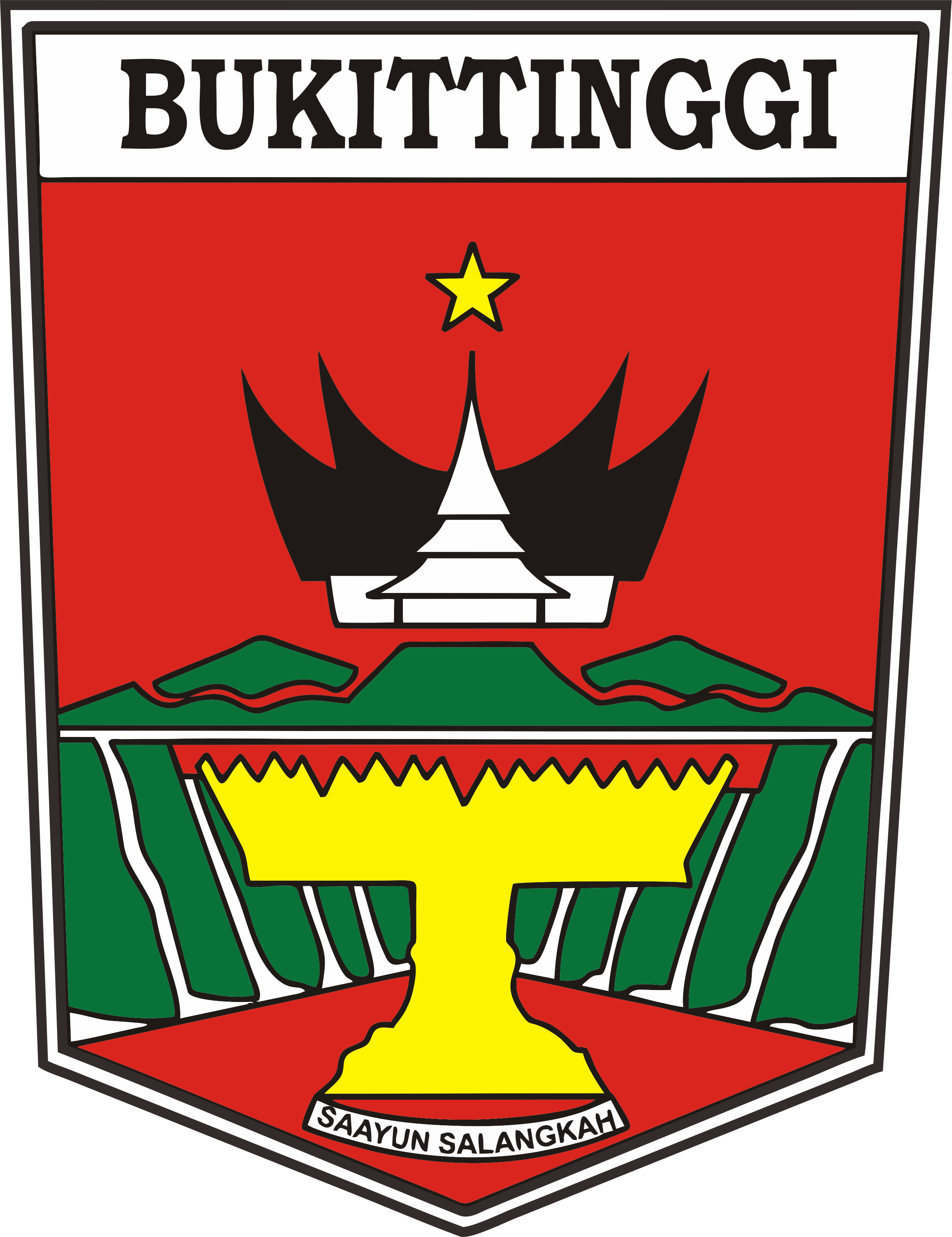
- Coat of arms
- Motto: Saayun Salangkah (Minangkabau: Same turn, same step)
- Location within West Sumatra

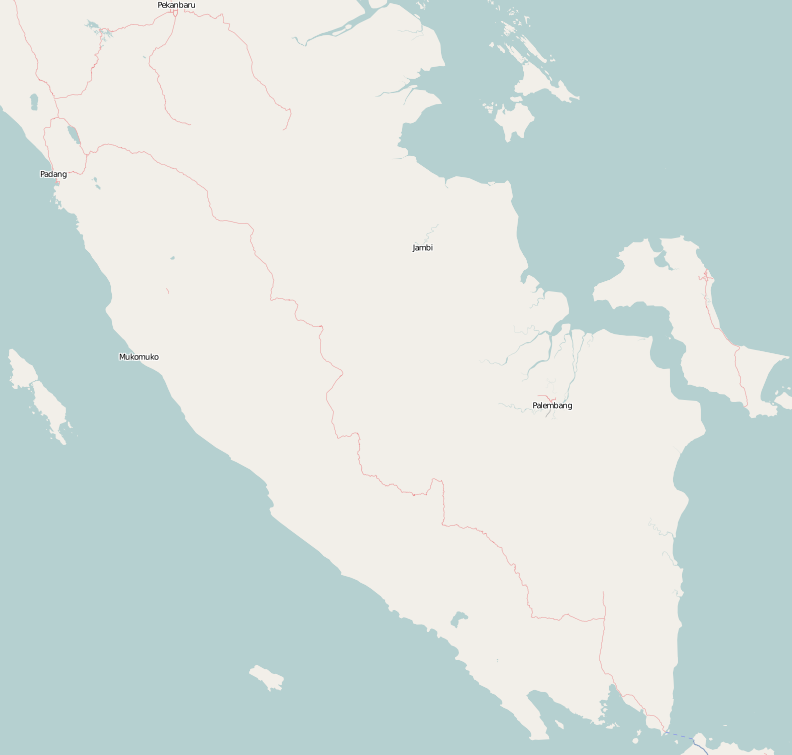
- Location in Southern Sumatra, Sumatra and Indonesia Bukittinggi (Sumatra) Bukittinggi (Indonesia)
- Coordinates: 0°18′20″S 100°22′9″E
- Country: Indonesia
- Province: West Sumatra

Government
  - Mayor: Ramlan Nurmatias
  - Vice Mayor: Ibnu Asis

Area
  - Total: 24.84 km^{2} (9.59 sq mi)
- Elevation: 930 m (3,050 ft)

Population (mid 2025 estimate)
  - Total: 125,920
  - Density: 5,069/km^{2} (13,130/sq mi)
- Time zone: UTC+7 (Indonesia Western Time)
- Postal code: 26000
- Area code: (+62) 752
- HDI (2022): ▲0.814 (very high)
- Climate: Af
- Website: bukittinggikota.go.id

Bukittinggi (Minangkabau: Bukiktinggi, Jawi: بوكيت تيڠڬي, formerly Dutch: Fort de Kock) is the third largest city in West Sumatra, Indonesia, with a population of 111,312 in 2010 and 121,028 in 2020. The official estimate as of mid 2025 lists a population of 125,920 (consisting of 62,809 males and 63,111 females). The city covers an area of 24.84 km^{2}. It is located in the Minangkabau Highlands, 90 km by road from the West Sumatran capital city of Padang. The city is completely surrounded by the Agam Regency (Bukittinggi was its regency seat until 1998), making it an enclave within the regency, and it is located at 0°18′20″S 100°22′9″E, near the volcanoes Mount Singgalang (inactive) and Mount Marapi (still active). At 930 m above sea level, the city has a cool climate with temperatures between 16.1° to 24.9 °C.

Bukittinggi used to be known as Fort de Kock and was once dubbed as 'Parijs van Sumatera'. The city was the capital of Indonesia during the Emergency Government of the Republic of Indonesia (PDRI). Before it became the capital of PDRI, the city was a centre of government at the time of the Dutch East Indies and during the Japanese colonial period.

Bukittinggi is also known as a leading tourist city in West Sumatra. It is twinned with Seremban in Negeri Sembilan, Malaysia. The Jam Gadang, a clock tower located in the heart of the city, is a symbol for the city and a well-visited tourist spot in the city.

The city is the birthplace of Mohammad Hatta, Indonesian co-proclamator and Assaat, then Indonesian (acting) president. Koto Gadang, a village in the southwest of the city, produces an abundance of statesmen, ministers, doctors, economist, artist and scholars who make great contribution to Indonesia, including Sutan Sjahrir, Agus Salim, Bahder Djohan, Rohana Kudus, Emil Salim, and Dr. Syahrir.

== History ==
The city has its origins in five villages that served as the basis for a marketplace. It was known as Fort de Kock in colonial times in reference to the Dutch outpost established here in 1825 during the Padri War.

The fort was founded by Captain Bauer at the top of Jirek hill and later named after the then Lieutenant Governor-General of the Dutch East Indies, Hendrik Merkus de Kock. The first road connecting the region with the west coast was built between 1833 and 1841 via the Anai Gorge, easing troop movements, cutting the costs of transportation and providing an economic stimulus for the agricultural economy.

In 1856 a teacher-training college (Kweekschool) was founded in the city, the first in Sumatra, as part of a policy to provide education opportunities to the indigenous population. A rail line connecting the city with Payakumbuh and Padang was constructed between 1891 and 1894.

During the Japanese occupation of West Sumatra in World War II, the city was the headquarters for the Japanese 25th Army, the force that occupied Sumatra. The headquarters was moved to the city in April 1943 from Singapore and remained until the Japanese surrender in August 1945.

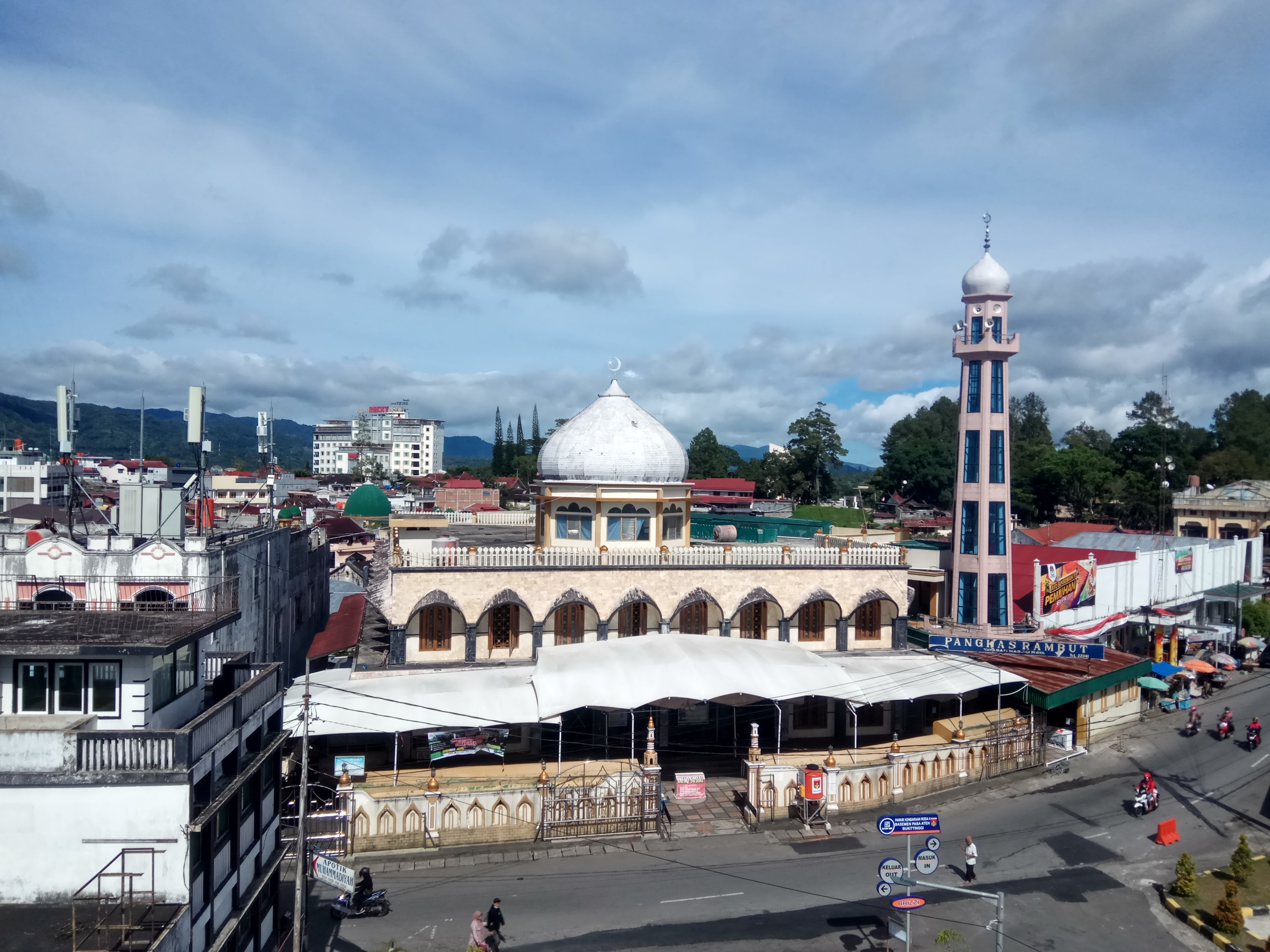
Mosque in central Bukittinggi

During the Indonesian National Revolution, the city saw a failed coup attempt by Islamist militias against the Indonesian republican government in 1947. During the second 'Police Action' Dutch forces invaded and occupied the city on 22 December 1948, having earlier bombed it in preparation. The city was surrendered to Republican officials in December 1949 after the Dutch government recognised Indonesian sovereignty.

The city was officially renamed Bukittinggi in 1949, replacing its colonial name. From 1950 until 1957, Bukittinggi was the capital city of a province called Central Sumatra, which encompassed West Sumatra, Riau and Jambi. In February 1958, during a revolt in Sumatra against the Indonesian government, rebels proclaimed the Revolutionary Government of the Republic of Indonesia (PRRI) in Bukittinggi. The Indonesian government had recaptured the town by May the same year.

A group of Muslim men had planned to bomb a cafe in the city frequented by foreign tourists in October 2007, but the plot was aborted due to the risk of killing Muslim individuals in the vicinity. Since 2008, the city administration has banned Valentine's Day and New Year's celebrations as they consider them not in line with Minangkabau traditions or Islam that can lead to "immoral acts" such as young couples hugging and kissing.

== Administrative districts ==
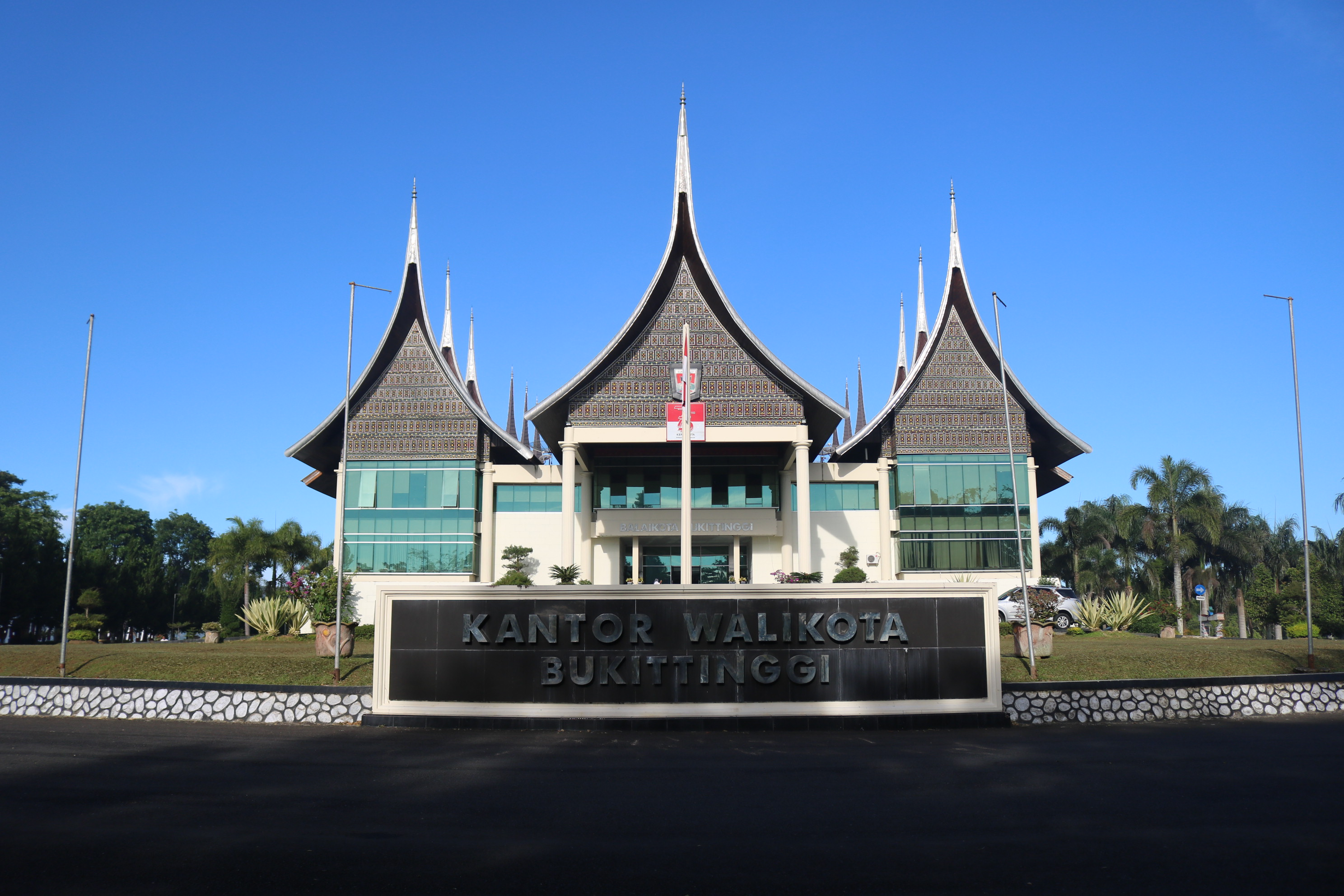
Bukittinggi city hall

Bukittinggi is divided into three districts (kecamatan), which are further divided into 24 urban subdistricts (kelurahan). The districts are tabulated below with their areas and their populations at the 2010 Census and the 2020 Census, together with the official estimates as of mid 2025. The table also includes the numbers of urban villages within each district.

Name of District (kecamatan)	Area in km^{2}	Pop'n 2010 Census	Pop'n 2020 Census	Pop'n mid 2025 Estimate	No. of kelurahan
Guguk Panjang	5.55	41.643	41,391	41,360	7
Mandiangin Koto Selayan	12.86	44,928	53,035	57,120	9
Aur Birugo Tigo Baleh	6.43	24,741	26,602	27,450	8
Totals	24.84	111,312	121,028	125,920	24

== Transportation ==
Bukittinggi is connected to Padang by road. Up until early 1980s, there was a railway service from Padang Panjang that used to serve the city. For inner-city transport, Bukittinggi employs a public transportation system known as "Mersi" (Merapi Singgalang) and "IKABE" that connect locations within the city. The city preserves the traditional horse-cart widely known in the area as Bendi, although the use is limited and more popular with tourists, both domestic and foreign.

== Tourism ==
Bukittinggi at Holiday Season

It is a city popular with tourists due to the climate and central location. Bukittinggi is also a popular shopping destination due to cheap textile and fashion products, especially for Malaysian. Best way to see Bukittinggi is by motorbike, car or by foot (trekkings). Attractions within the city include:

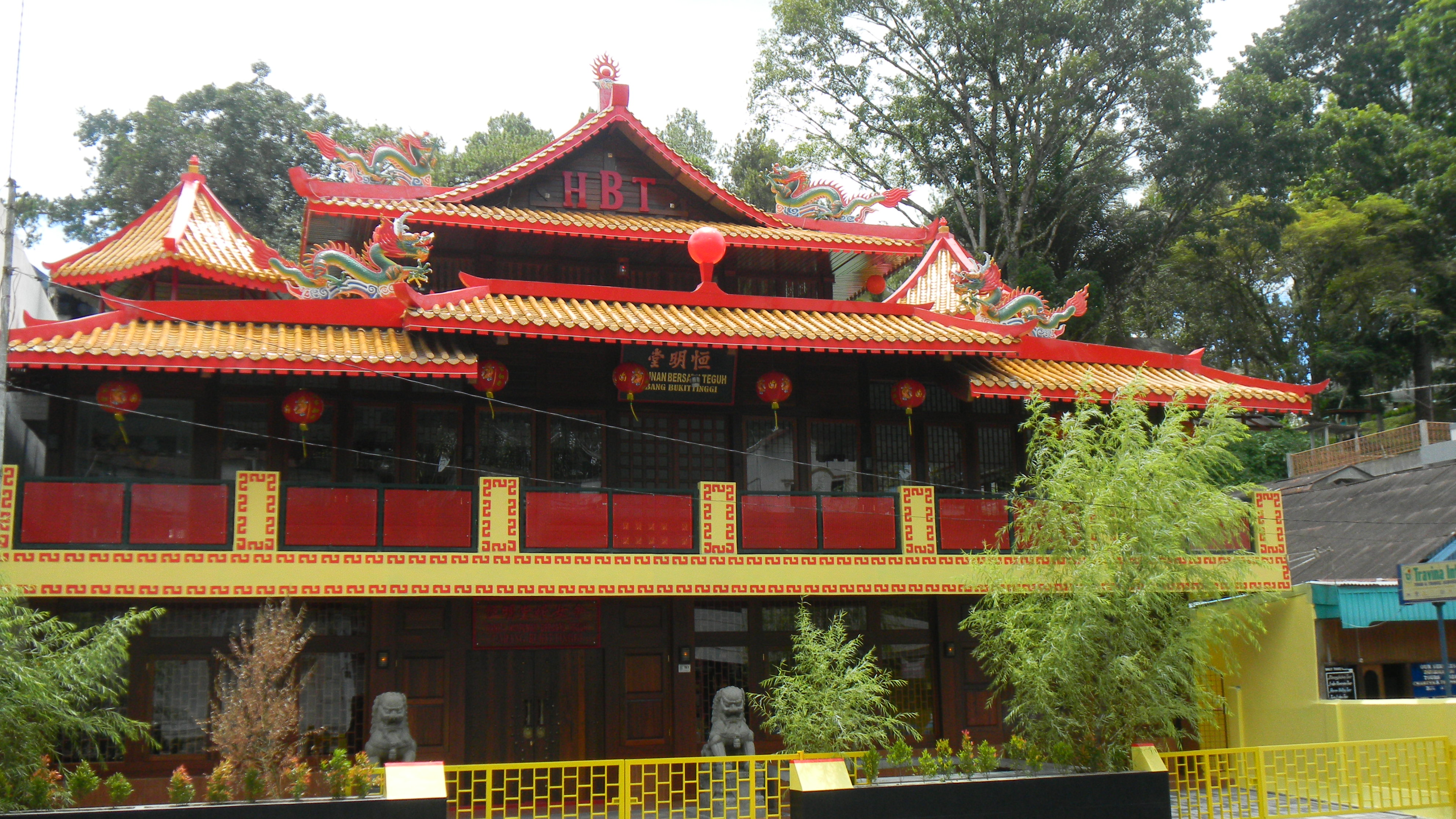
"Himpunan Bersatu Teguh" building which is located at Jend. Ahmad Yani street in Bukittinggi.

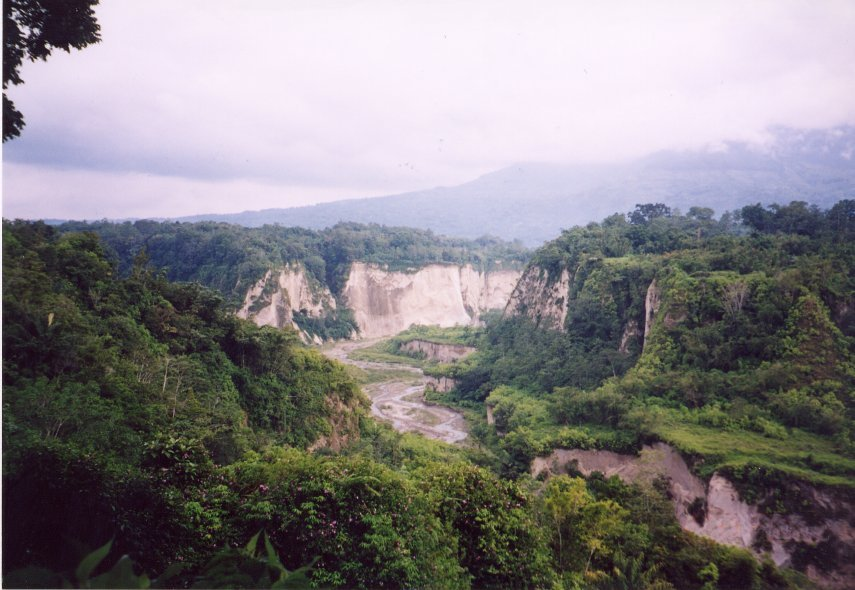
Sianok Canyon

- Ngarai Sianok (Sianok Canyon)
- Lubang Jepang (Japanese Caves) — a network of underground bunkers and tunnels built by the Japanese during World War II
- Jam Gadang — a large clock tower built by the Dutch in 1926.
- Pasar Atas and Pasar Aur Kuning are traditional markets downtown.
- Taman Bundo Kanduang park. The park includes a replica Rumah Gadang (literally: big house) with the distinctive Minangkabau roof architecture) used as a museum of Minangkabau culture and a zoo. The Dutch hilltop outpost Fort de Kock is connected to the zoo by the Limpapeh Bridge pedestrian overpass.
- Museum Rumah Kelahiran Bung Hatta (Museum of Bung Hatta Birthplace), the house where Indonesian founding father Mohammad Hatta was born, now a museum.
- Janjang Koto Gadang also known as Great Wall of Koto Gadang. It is like a miniature of Chinese great wall, with hundred-step stairs connects Taman Panorama and Koto Gadang village.

Notable nearby destinations include Lake Maninjau, Lake Tarusan, Kamang Cave, and Tarang Cave.

== Sister cities ==
- Seremban, Malaysia

== Notable residents ==
- Khailan Syamsu (1905–1962), human rights activist and Esperantist.
