= Tjoe Bou San =

Chinese Indonesian journalist (d.1925)

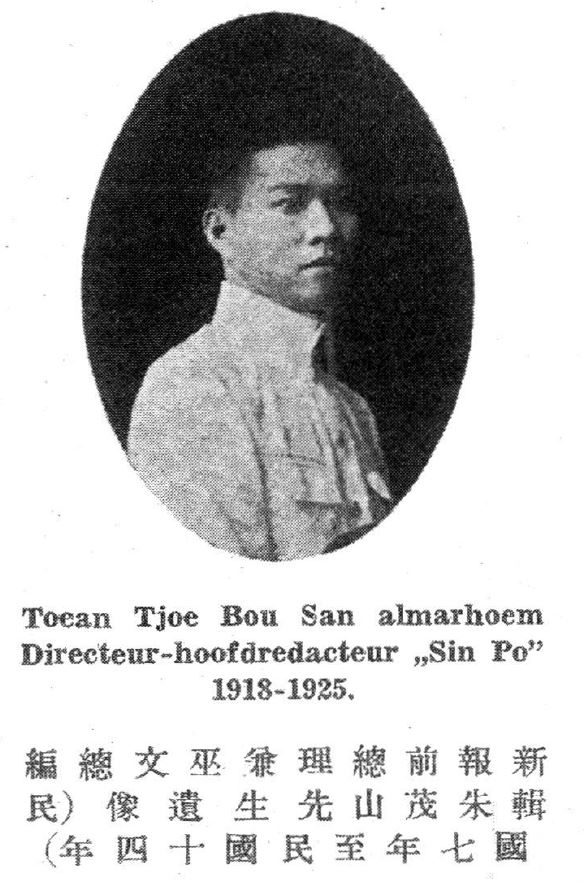
Portrait of Tjoe Bou San, Chinese-Indonesian newspaperman

Tjoe Boe San (Chinese: 朱茂山) (born around 1892 in Batavia, Dutch East Indies, died 1925 in Batavia) was a Chinese nationalist, translator and newspaper editor in the Dutch East Indies, most notably editor and director of the influential Indonesian Chinese newspaper Sin Po until his death in 1925. Along with Kwee Kek Beng, he was a key member of the "Sin Po Group" (named after the newspaper) which was a political faction of the Indonesian Chinese which believed that they should stay out of Dutch colonial politics and remain focused on China.

== Biography ==
=== Early life ===
Tjoe was the son of Tjoe Hoat Hin, a textile dealer at Pasar Gelap in Batavia. He studied in a Dutch private school and a Chinese school where he formally learned Hokkien, and could soon read English, Malay and Chinese.

=== Newspaper career ===
While he was still in his teen years Tjoe started writing for newspapers such as Hoa Pit and Perniagaan. In 1909, he became editor-in-chief of a weekly magazine called Hoa Tok Po. He was sympathetic to Sun Yat Sen's 1911 revolution.

In 1917 he relocated to Surabaya and became editor in chief of Tjhoen Tjhioe, but only from February to June of that year, after which he went to China. He apparently worked as a correspondent for Sin Po while in China.

When he returned from China to the Indies in 1918, he went to work for Sin Po in Batavia, the most popular Indonesian Chinese newspaper of its time and one of the top newspapers in the Indies. By 1919 he had been appointed editor in chief and director of the newspaper. He made a number of changes to the already successful newspaper, including the launch of a Chinese language edition in 1921, which quickly became the top paper in that language in the Indies, as well as launching a short-lived East Java Malay language version of Sin Po in Surabaya. He also tried to launch another daily newspaper in Batavia called Bin Seng, with himself as editor under the pen name of Oen Tjip Tiong, but it did not last long.

=== Political beliefs ===
Tjoe was a fervent Chinese nationalist and believed that the Indonesian Chinese should be focused on China and not on local Indies politics. He was against the idea of adopting the limited version of Dutch citizenship or subjecthood which was then being debated in the Indies. He also campaigned against Indië Weerbaar, a proposal for a standing native army in the Indies which was strongly opposed by the Sarekat Islam and other Indonesian nationalist groups as well. His focus was on traditional Chinese culture and the teachings of Confucius rather than a radical version of Chinese politics, despite his sympathy for Sun Yat Sen.

He famously clashed with P.H. Fromberg Sr., a Dutch legal expert who had served in the Dutch East Indies as an official of the Chinese Affairs Bureau and was close to the Chinese community. Tjoe eventually published some of Fromberg's writings, as well as his own criticism, in Pergerakan Tionghoa di Hindia Olanda dan Mr. P.H. Fromberg Sr. (Malay The Chinese movement in the Indies and Mr. P.H. Fromberg Sr.) (1921).

His political beliefs were featured prominently in the 1924 book Doea kepala batoe (Malay: Two heads of stone) by Kwee Hing Tjiat, a previous editor of Sin Po (until 1918) and close ally of Tjoe's. The book featured a debate between Tjoe and Yap Hong Tjoen, a member of the Chung Hwa Hui, who believed that Chinese should be focused on Dutch colonial politics.

=== Literary career ===
During his entire career as a journalist and newspaper editor, Tjoe was a prolific writer and translated. His works were published serially in various newspapers as well as in book format. His main focus was on translating European novels and the works of Confucius into Malay.

=== Death ===
He died in 1925 in Batavia at age 34. After his death, some of his close friends took over his duties at Sin Po. Ang Jan Goan became director, a position he held for several decades, and Kwee Kek Beng became editor in chief.

== Selected works ==
- Penghidoepan radja Belgie, satoe tjerita jang betoel telah kedjadian di Europa (Malay: Way of Life of a Belgian king, a story that really happened in Europe) (1913), translation from unknown source
- Satoe djodo jang terhalang (Malay: Two mates who were interfered with) (1917, pseudonymously as Hauw San Liang)
- Tjerita pendjahat di Parys (1917, pseudonymously as Hauw San Liang) translation of unknown French language novel, first published serially in Tjhoen Tjhioe
- Dengan satalen mengitari boemi (1918), translation of French language novel Les cinq sous de Lavarède by Paul d'Ivoi and Henri Chabrillat.
- Djadi korbannja napsoe atawa siotjia idoeng poeti : satoe tjerita jang belon lama soeda kedjadian di Soerabaja (Malay: Victim of lust, or, the white-nosed girl: a story which took place in Surabaya not long ago) (1918)
- Binasa lantaran harta (Malay: Perish because of wealth) (pseudonymously as San Ling Hauw, year unknown)
- Pergerakan Tionghoa di Hindia Olanda dan Mr. P.H. Fromberg Sr. (Malay The Chinese movement in the Indies and Mr. P.H. Fromberg Sr.) (1921)
- Lima tahon kamoedian : samboengan dari tjerita The Loan Eng (Malay: Five year later: continuation of the story of The Loan Eng) (1922, pseudonymously as Getoel Gaet)
