= Kwee Kek Beng =

Chinese Indonesian journalist

Kwee Kek Beng (Chinese: 郭克明, 1900–1975) was a Chinese Indonesian journalist and writer, best known for being editor-in-chief of the popular Malay language newspaper Sin Po from 1925 to 1947.

== Biography ==
=== Early life ===
Kwee was born in Batavia, Dutch East Indies on November 16, 1900. He received a Dutch language education at the Hollandsch Chineesche School in Batavia. Around 1915-17 he attended the Openbare Muloschool (MULO) in Batavia and then a teacher training institute (Kweekschool). In 1922 he started working as a schoolteacher in Bogor, not far from Batavia.

=== Journalism career ===
While still working as a teacher in 1922, Kwee contributed writings to the Dutch-language Java Bode. Impressed by his writings, Na Tjin Hoe, an editor at Sin Po invited Kwee to work at the short-lived Bin Seng, a spinoff newspaper of Sin Po focusing on local news. Even this junior position at the newspaper gave him almost double the salary he had been making as a teacher. He soon transferred to the editorial board of Sin Po itself. When former editor-in-chief Tjoe Bou San died in 1925, Kwee Kek Beng was promoted to the position. That same year, he became vice-chairman of a union for Indies journalists, the Journalistenbond Asia, along with editors of Hindia Baroe, Perniagaan, Bintang Hindia, and other papers.

In 1929 he travelled outside of the Indies for the first time in his life, touring the Malay Peninsula and Singapore, following a few years later with his first trip to China in 1933. Like his predecessors, he was also a strong Chinese nationalist. But, as with many other Indies Chinese intellectuals during the late 1920s and early 1930s, he also became increasingly sympathetic to the rising Indonesian nationalist movement. He was a close personal friend of a number of nationalist leaders including Sukarno, Sartono, and WR Soepratman. During the 1930s he served as an assistant at Soeloeh Indonesia Moeda (Indonesian: Voice of young Indonesia), the magazine of the Partai Nasional Indonesia. He also used his position at Sin Po to publish 5000 leaflets containing the score of the nationalist song Indonesia Raya, which were distributed with the paper in November 1928.

Shortly before the Japanese occupation of the Dutch East Indies, Kwee sent his relatives to hide out in Sukabumi. He himself planned to stay in Batavia under the assumed name Thio Boen Hiok, but soon found it too dangerous and fled to Bandung, where he spent most of the war. Shortly after his departure his house in Batavia was discovered and looted by the Kenpeitai.

After the war ended Sin Po resumed publication and Kwee returned to his position. In 1947 he got into a dispute with publisher Ang Jan Goan, and resigned as editor-in-chief in 1947.

After Indonesian independence, he became a vocal critic of Indonesia's treatment of its Chinese minority. For example, he was co-writer of the Memorandum Commissie Chung Hwa Hui in 1947 which documented abuses against the Chinese population by the Indonesian republican forces. Nonetheless, in 1950 Kwee became an Indonesian citizen. He spent most of the 1950s as a freelance writer, publishing prolifically, especially about China. He founded a monthly journal Java Critic in 1948, contributed to the monthly Reporter during the 1950s and was editor of the annual journal Sin Tjhoen during 1956–60.

He died in Jakarta on May 31, 1975.

=== Family ===
His wife was named Tee Lim Nio. They had four children, two girls and two sons. Their first son Kwee Hin Goan, born in 1932, became a well-known architect in Indonesia during the 1950s-1965 and in the Netherlands from 1966 to 1992. Their second son Kwee Hin Houw, born in 1938, became a journalist and lived in Germany from the 1960s until his death in 2016.

== Selected writings ==
- Beknopt Overzicht der Chineesche Geschiedenis (A brief overview of Chinese history) (in Dutch, Batavia, 1925)
- Li Tai Po, Een Kleine Studie Over China’s Grootsten Dichter (in Dutch, Batavia, 1927);
- Doea Poeloe Lima Tahon Sebagi Wartawan, 1922-1947 (Twenty-five years as a journalist) (in Indonesian, Jakarta, 1948)
- Ke Tiongkok Baru (To a new China)(in Indonesian, Jakarta, 1952)
- Seikitar Stalin (Around Stalin) (in Indonesian, Jakarta, 1953)
- Pendekar-Pendekar R.R.T (Who's who in New China) (in Indonesian, Jakarta, 1953)
- Bevrijd China (Freed China) (1954)
- Djamblang Kotjok (in Indonesian, 1954)
- Kung Fu Tze, artinja, pengaruhnja, penghidupannja peladjarannja (in Indonesian, Jakarta, 1955)
- 50.000 kilometer dalam 100 hari (50,000 kilometres in 100 days) (in Indonesian, Jakarta, 1965)
